= Sarı Saltık =

Sufi saint (died 1297/1298)

Saltık
- صالتق
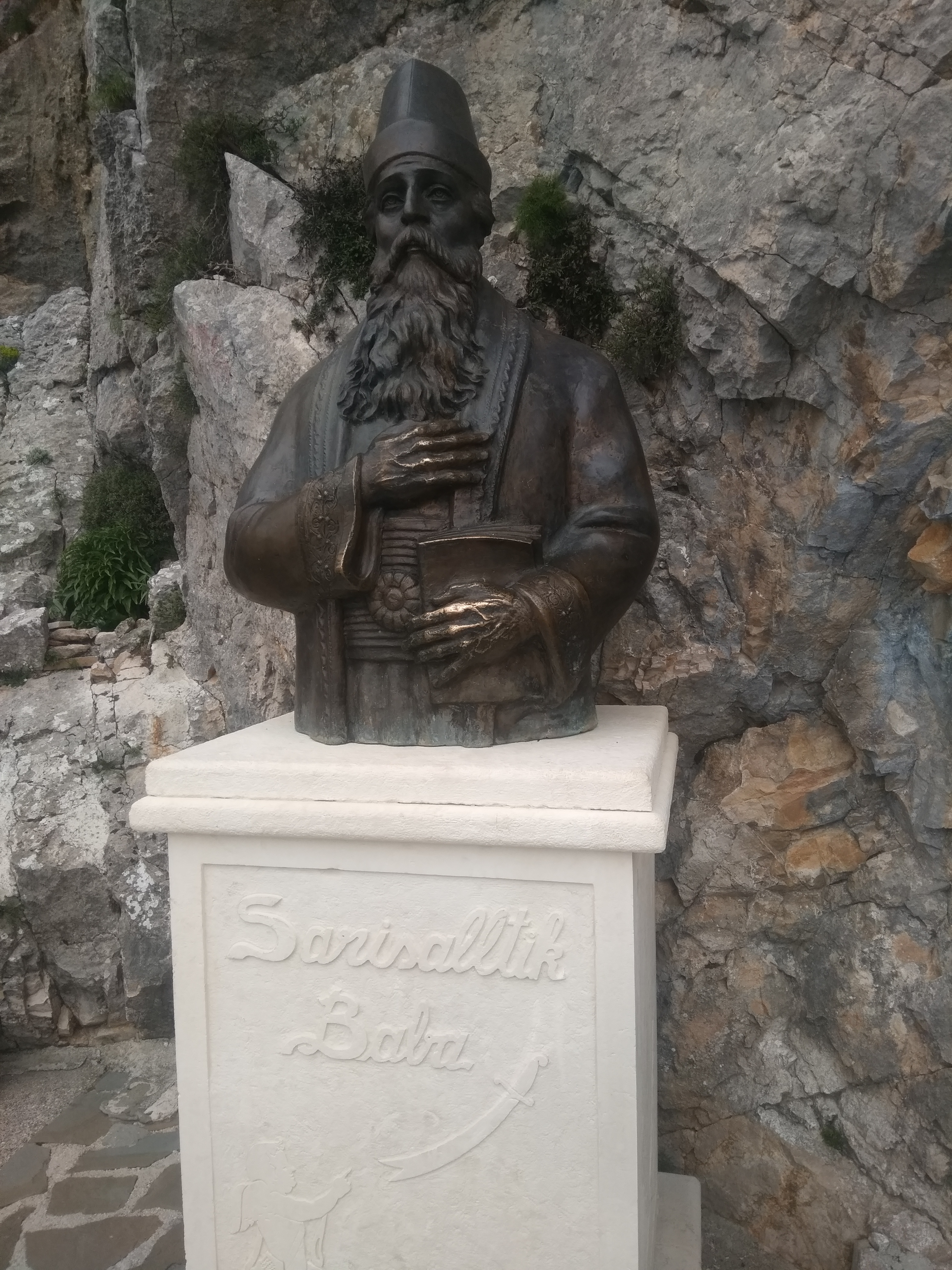
- Bust of Sari Saltik in Kruje, Albania.

Personal life
- Born: Unknown, possibly Bukhara
- Died: c. 1297/98 Babadag, Golden Horde
- Resting place: Mausoleum of Sari Saltuk Baba, Babadag, Romania; 44°53′37.3″N 28°43′07.0″E
- Era: Late Middle Ages
- Known for: Sufi mysticism

Religious life
- Religion: Islam

Muslim leader
- Period in office: 13th century
- Influenced by: Haji Bektash Veli

Sarı Saltık (alternatively spelled as Sarı Saltuk and also referred as Sarı Saltuk Baba or Dede, Ottoman Turkish: صارى صالتق, romanized: Ṣârı̊ Ṣâltı̊ḳ; Ṣârı̊ Ṣâltuḳ; sarı meaning 'the blonde', died 1297/98) was a 13th-century Alevi Turkish dervish, venerated as a saint by the Bektashi Sufi Muslims in the Balkans and parts of Middle East as well as the mainstream Sunni Muslim community.

== Historical figure ==
According to 14th-century Moroccan traveller Ibn Battuta, Saltik was an "ecstatic devotee", although "things are told of him that are reproved by the Divine Law". He is considered by various sources a disciple of Mahmud Hayran, of Haji Bektash Veli, or of one of the successors of Ahmed ar-Rifa'i. According to the 17th-century traveller Evliya Çelebi, his real name was Mehmed, and he was from Bukhara. Early 20th-century historian Frederick Hasluck considered him a saint of a Tatar tribe from Crimea, which had brought his cult into Dobruja, from where it was spread by the Bektashis.

After the defeat of the Sultan of Rum Kaykaus II at the Battle of Sivirhisar by the Ilkhanids, Saltik was amongst the members of his court that fled with him to Byzantine Constantinople in summer 1262, and were subsequently welcomed by Emperor Michael VIII Palaiologos.

According to the 15th-century Oghuznameh narrative, he accompanied a group of Anatolia Turkomans into Dobruja, where they were settled by Michael VIII to protect the northern frontier of the empire. The same source places him in Crimea after 1265, along the Turkomans transferred there by Tatar khan Berke, and after 1280 mentions him leading the nomads back to Dobruja. According to researcher Rustam Shukurov:

[...] the accounts of Yazıcızâde ‘Alī can be understood in the sense that Michael Palaiologos authorized a fairly large-scale emigration of nomadic Turks, partisans of ‘Izz al-Dīn, from Anatolia to the European part of the Byzantine empire. It seems plausible that the main bulk of the Turkish nomads was settled by the Byzantine authorities in Southern Dobruja. The spiritual leader of the Turks of Dobruja was Sarı Saltık. The warriors of these nomadic groups participated in some victorious wars on the side of the emperor, in particular, one may think, during the reconquest of Dobruja in the name of Michael VIII Palaiologos. The later Ottoman historian Lokmân adds that the nomadic resettlement in Dobruja happened in 662 H. (4 November 1263-23 October 1264) a date which perfectly fits the information available from other sources. [...] One further addition can be made: it is possible that the leading administrative role among the Dobrujan Turks belonged to the sultan’s maternal uncle Kyr Khāya and not to the mystic saint Sarı Saltık.

After the death of Sari Saltik, some of the Turkomans returned to Anatolia, while other remained and became Christians, possibly becoming the ancestors of the Gagauz people. This migration has characteristics of a folk epic destan, and its historicity is doubted by some scholars.

=== Legacy in Babadag ===
The town of Babadag (Turkish, Babadağ, Mountain of the Baba), in the Romanian Dobruja, identified with the town of Baba Saltuq visited in 1331/1332 by Ibn Battuta, is said to be named after him. The oldest sources about Sari Saltik available place his tomb in the area of the future town. This tomb was visited in 1484/1485 by Ottoman Sultan Bayezid II during a military campaign, and, after reporting an important victory, he ordered the building of a religious and educational complex here (including a mausoleum to Saltik, finished in 1488), around which the town developed. According to Evliya Çelebi, a marble sarcophagus was found during the construction, with a Tatar inscription attesting it was the tomb of the saint. However this miraculous discovery is not mentioned in other sources talking about the sultan's passage through the town.

Babadag became an important place of pilgrimage, visited in 1538 by Suleiman the Magnificent, and the most important urban centre in 16th-century Dobruja. The town however decayed during the frequent wars that ravaged the region during the 17th century, and was eventually burned down, along with the mausoleum to Saltik, during the Russo-Turkish Wars. A simple domed türbe was rebuilt over the grave of the saint in 1828. The mausoleum in Babadag remains of relative importance even nowadays, and was recently renovated, being reinaugurated in 2007 by the then-Turkish prime-minister Recep Tayyip Erdoğan.

== Legendary figure ==
In various Orthodox Christian legends, he is identified with saints such as Saint George, Elijah, Saint Nicholas, Saint Simeon, Saint Naum or Saint Spyridon. According to a local legend, his body was buried in seven coffins, in remote towns and villages within the lands of the Infidels. Nowadays, alleged tombs (türbe) of his, are found all over the Balkans (Blagaj, Mostar, Krujë, Kaliakra) and western Anatolia (İznik).
