= Battle of Rhoupelion (1255) =

1255 battle

- Part of the Byzantine–Bulgarian wars and the Struggle for Constantinople
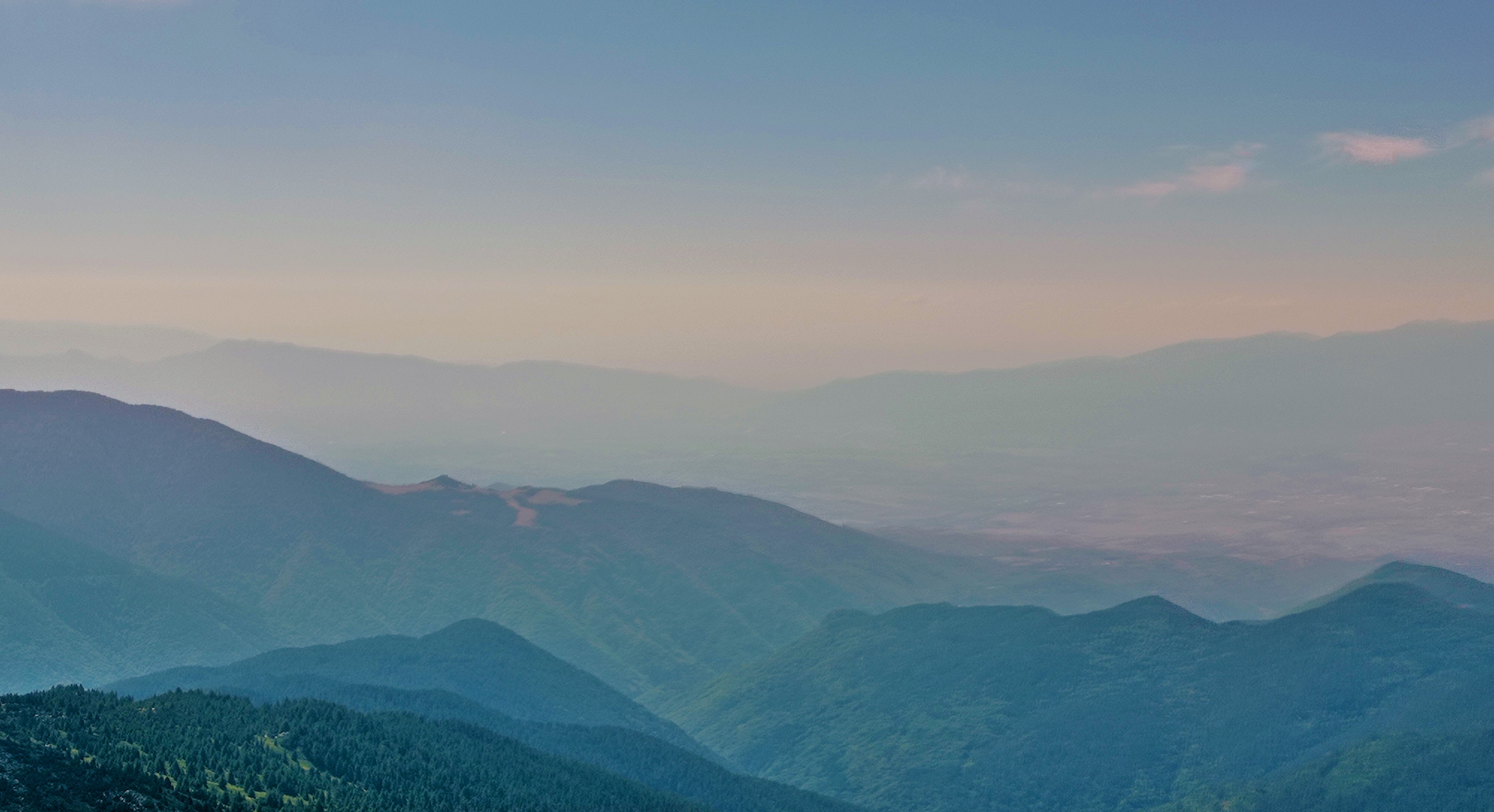
- Modern view of the Rupel Pass from the ridge of Sinanitsa.
| Date | Summer 1255 |
| Location | Roupel Pass, modern day Greece |
| Result | Nicaean victory |

Belligerents
| Second Bulgarian Empire | Empire of Nicaea |

Commanders and leaders
| Dragotas (DOW) | Theodore II Laskaris; Theodore Nestongos; John Angelos |

Strength
| Unknown | Unknown |

The Battle of Rhoupelion or Second Battle of Kleidion was an attempt by the Bulgarian forces of Dragotas to hold the Roupel Pass against the Nicaean army of Emperor Theodore II Laskaris in the Summer of 1255. Having conducted a lengthy siege of Nicaean-held Melnik, the Bulgarians fortified the pass to block the approach of the relief army under the emperor, but the Nicaean contingents succeeded in circumventing the barricades and routing the Bulgarians. This victory enabled Theodore II to relieve Melnik and launch a counter-invasion against Bulgaria.

== Background ==
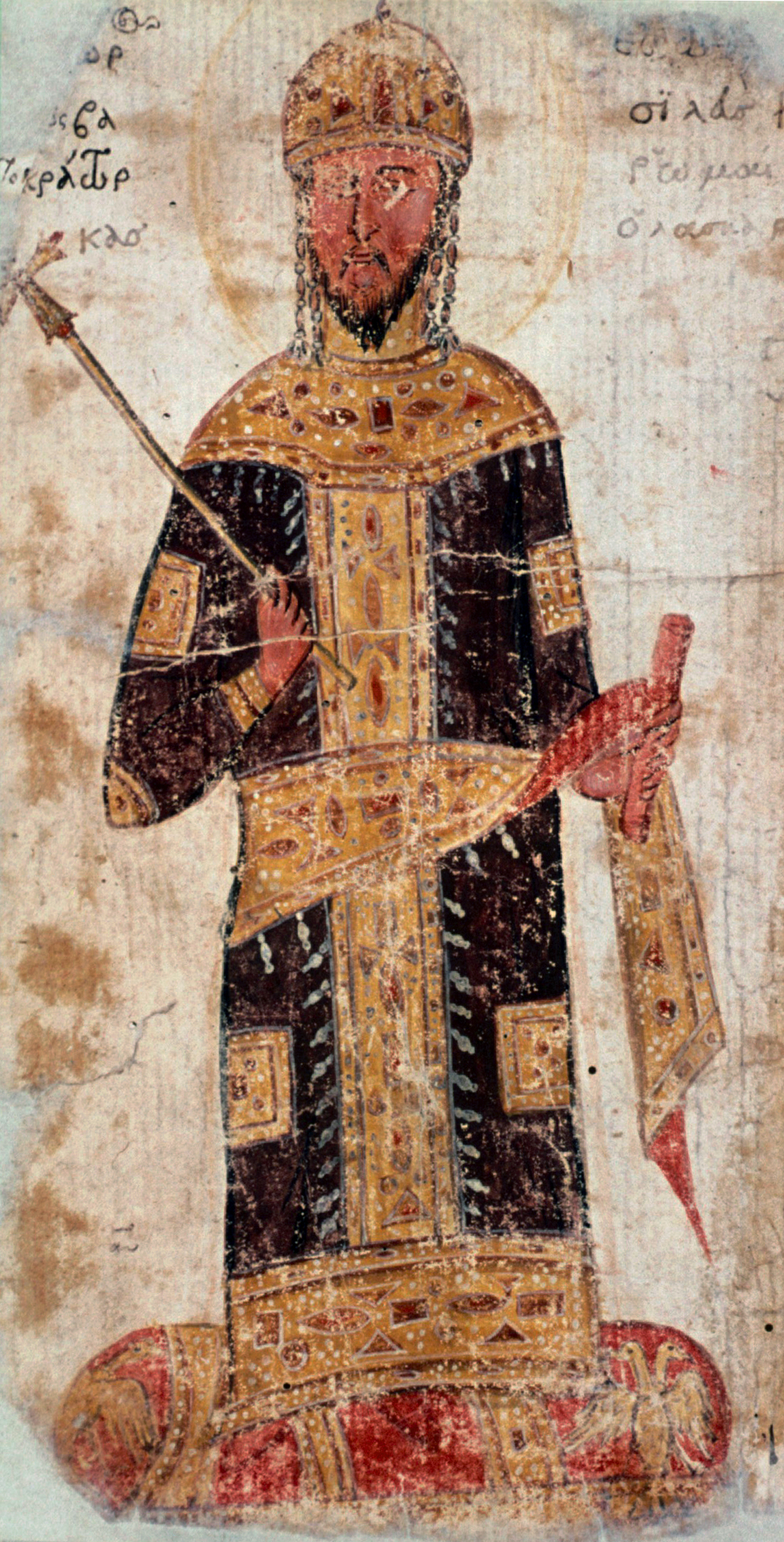
Miniature of Emperor Theodore II Laskaris from the Rhomaike Historia of George Pachymeres

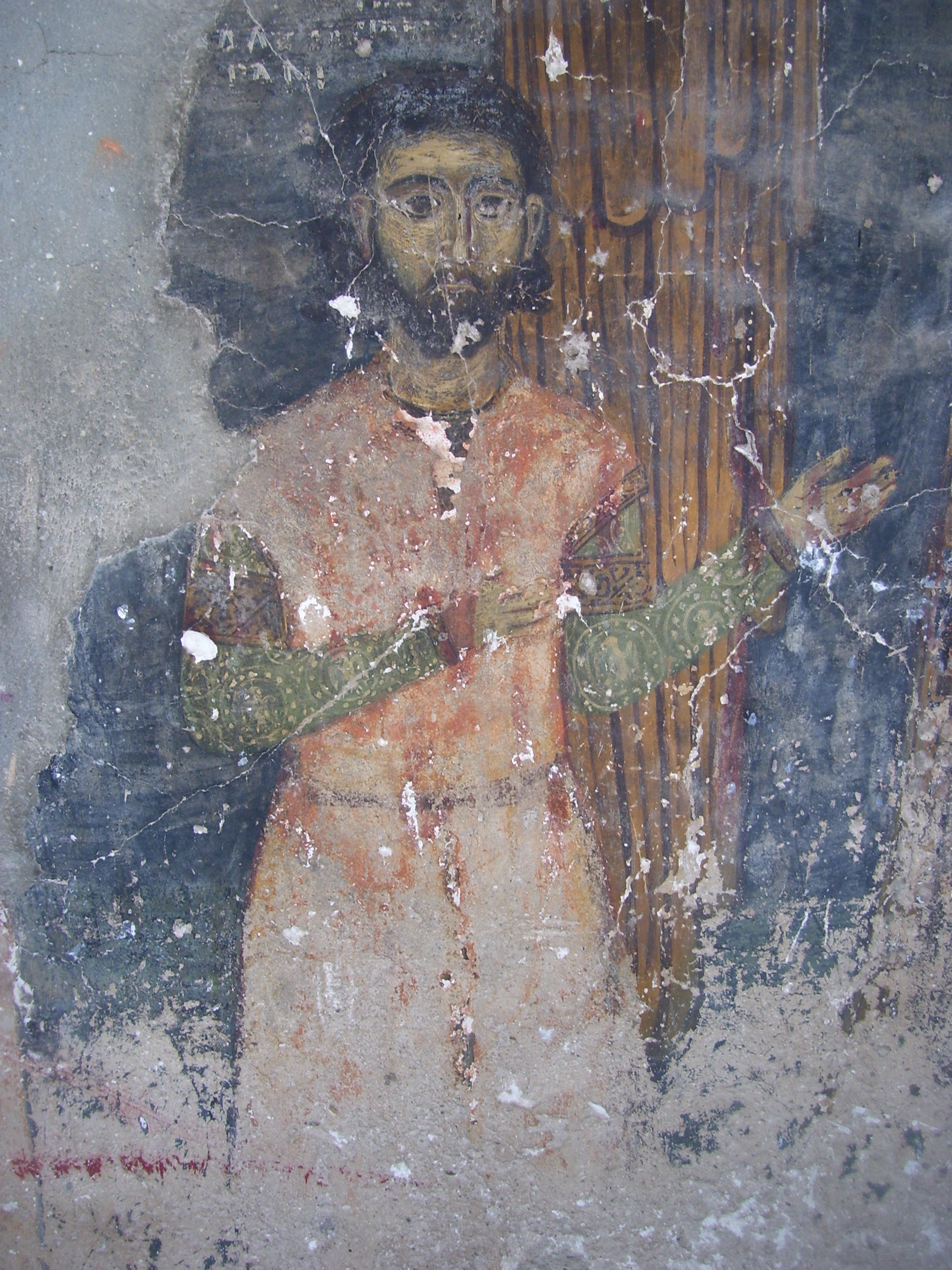
Portrait of Tsar Michael II Asen from the Metropolis of the Agioi Taxiarches in Kastoria

In November 1254, the Nicaean Emperor John III Vatatzes passed away and was succeeded by his son Theodore II Laskaris. The immediate activities of the new Emperor were to travel to Asia Minor, where he renewed a treaty with the Sultanate of Rum after recent skirmishes between Nicaean forces and Turkoman raiders. The Tsar of Bulgaria, Michael II Asen, sought to exploit the uncertain situation of Vatatzes' succession to regain territory previously lost to the Nicaeans. The Nicaean soldiers garrisoning these towns had faltering morale, and consequently, when the Bulgarians invaded they either abandoned their posts and retreated or surrendered. In this manner, the Bulgarians captured the fortresses of Peristitza, Krytzimos, Tzepaina, Oustra, Perperakion, Kryvous, and Ephraim, and regained dominion over much of the Rhodope Mountains.

After hosting a council with his generals, Theodore II resolved to lead a winter campaign to check the advance of the Bulgarians, gathering all of the men he could on his march towards Thrace. Soon after reaching Adrianople, Theodore encountered and defeated the forces of Michael Asen, routing the Tsar and capturing his camp. Theodore subsequently sacked Boroea after defeating its Bulgarian garrison and dispatched an army to recapture Achridos, which overran the Bulgarian garrisons there. Theodore himself then advanced to the Rhodope region and, through the use of siege engines, recaptured Peristitza, Stenimachos and Krytzimos, though a snowstorm forced him to withdraw before he could attempt a siege of Tzepaina. In spring 1255, another Nicaean attempt to retake Tzepaina, this time under Alexios Strategopoulos and Constantine Tornikes, failed after the column was ambushed by the Bulgarians. The situation then shifted against the Nicaeans, when one Dragotas, a Bulgarian who had previously defected to Nicaea in 1246, defected again to rejoin Michael II Asen. This development facilitated the capture of Skopje, Prilep and Veles from the Nicaeans, while a Bulgarian army under Dragotas besieged Melnik.

== Siege of Melnik and Battle of Rhoupelion ==
The Nicaean garrison inside Melnik was commanded by Theodore Nestongos and John Angelos. Nestongos and Angelos were capable and experienced commanders and resisted the Bulgarians ferociously, utilizing arrows, artillery, and other sophisticated Byzantine siege weaponry to repulse Dragotas' assaults. They had previously gathered a large quantity of supplies into Melnik to sustain their men, but as the siege dragged on into summer, the garrison began to suffer from shortages of water. In order to maintain a prolonged investment of Melnik, Dragotas dispatched part of his army, comprised mainly of infantry, to garrison the Rhoupelion Pass against relief efforts by the Nicaeans. These Bulgarians fortified the entrance to the Strymon river valley to prevent a northward advance by the Nicaeans toward Melnik.

By summer, Theodore II Laskaris had prepared a significant army and supply train with the objective of relieving Melnik. When he reached Serres, the Emperor conducted a prayer to the military saints Theodore Stratelates and Theodore Tiron for success in the coming battle, before continuing towards Melnik. The Nicaeans soon learned of the Bulgarian preparation at Rhoupelion, prompting Theodore to rearrange his formation. To better account for the rough and narrow terrain of the path, he deployed the infantry and bowmen ahead of the cavalry. The Nicaean footmen ascended the steep mountains astride of the valley, concealed by the forests on the mountain side. From their elevated vantage point, the Nicaean archers loosed volleys into the Bulgarian troops holding the pass below. The Nicaean cavalry under Theodore II himself, which had followed up the advance of the infantry, launched a simultaneous attack against the Bulgarian breastworks. Pressured by the Nicaean archers on the hills above them and the Nicaean cavalry attack to their front, the Bulgarian defence collapsed into a rout, enabling the Nicaeans to secure the pass.

The surviving Bulgarians from Rhoupelion fled back to Dragotas' force besieging Melnik. Although the Bulgarians had gained control of the lower town of Melnik and forced the Nicaean garrison into the citadel by this point, news of the arrival of the emperor's army and its successful breach of the Rhoupel Pass induced a mass panic among Dragotas' army. The Bulgarians attempted to retreat through the night, but as the sky was cloudy, a large number of their soldiers died in their attempt to flee over the rough terrain, some tripping and being trampled and others falling from cliffs. Dragotas himself fell from his horse and was trampled by his men, dying of his wounds three days later.

== Aftermath ==
After arriving at Melnik, Theodore exiled all relatives of the townsmen that had joined the Bulgarians and confiscated their properties. The emperor then marched toward Veles and retook this settlement after its 500-man Bulgarian garrison surrendered at the sight of the Nicaean counterweight trebuchets, before returning to Serres. Theodore left a force under Alexios Doukas Philanthropenos to continue the campaign against Bulgaria, while he returned to Asia Minor to navigate developments with the Turkomans and Mongols. Philanthropenos recaptured the Mountain fortress of Patmos from the Bulgarians, and when Theodore returned to Thrace in late 1255, he attempted to resume the offensive against Tzepaina with another winter campaign. However, he was again thwarted by the arrival heavy snows, though the Nicaeans captured and pillaged the town of Batkounion during their retreat. Emperor Theodore returned to Asia Minor for the remainder of the winter after placing a garrison under Constantine Margarites and Manuel Laskaris at Didymoteicho. Michael II Asen used this interval to assemble a force of Cuman allies for a counteroffensive against Nicaea in the following year. The Bulgarian-Cuman invasion that ensued culminated in a further battle against Theodore II Laskaris at Bizye.

== Bibliography ==
- Wilskman, Juho (2026). Military History of Byzantine Rome, 1204-1261. Pen and Sword. ISBN 978 1 39904 762 3.
- Kanellopoulos, Nicholas S.; Lekea, Joanne K. (2007). "The Struggle between the Nicean Empire and the Bulgarian State (1254–1256): Towards a Revival of Byzantine Military Tactics under Theodore II Lascaris". In Rogers, Clifford J.; DeVries, Kelly; France, John (eds.). The Journal of Medieval Military History. Vol. V. The Boydell Press. pp. 56–69. ISBN 978-1-84383-339-0.
- Kyriakidis, Savvas (2011). Warfare in Late Byzantium, 1204–1453. Brill. pp. 190–191.
- Kaldellis, Anthony (2023). The New Roman Empire: A History of Byzantium. Oxford University Press. ISBN 978-0197549322.
