= Bulgarian campaigns of Michael VIII (1263) =

Byzantine–Bulgarian war

- Part of the Byzantine–Bulgarian wars, Byzantine-Hungarian wars & Bulgarian–Hungarian wars
- Byzantine Empire and its neighbours in 1265, following the territorial gains of Michael Glabas Tarchaneiotes' campaign
Date	1263
Location	Thrace, Bulgaria and Dobruja
Result	Byzantine-Hungarian victory
Territorial changes	Mesembria and Vicina conquered by Byzantium; Hungarian suzerainty over Vidin

Belligerents
Second Bulgarian Empire; Cumans; Russians	Byzantine Empire	Kingdom of Hungary

Commanders and leaders
Constantine I Tih (WIA) Jacob Svetoslav; Mitso Asen (surrendered)	Michael VIII Michael Doukas Glabas Tarchaneiotes; Kīr Khāya	rex iunior Stephen Ladislaus II Kán; Jacob Svetoslav

The Bulgarian campaigns of Michael VIII were a series of counteroffensives conducted by the Byzantine Empire against the Second Bulgarian Empire in 1263. The campaigns were organised by Emperor Michael VIII Palaiologos in retaliation to incursions by the armies of Tsar Constantine I Tih, which had captured Byzantine possessions in Thrace in 1262. The Byzantine offensives were highly successful and facilitated both the recapture of lost settlements and the annexation of new territories in Bulgaria. The extension of Byzantine attacks into Western Bulgaria prompted the intervention of the Kingdom of Hungary, which entered the conflict as an opponent of both states, establishing suzerainty over regions in Western Bulgaria.

== Background ==
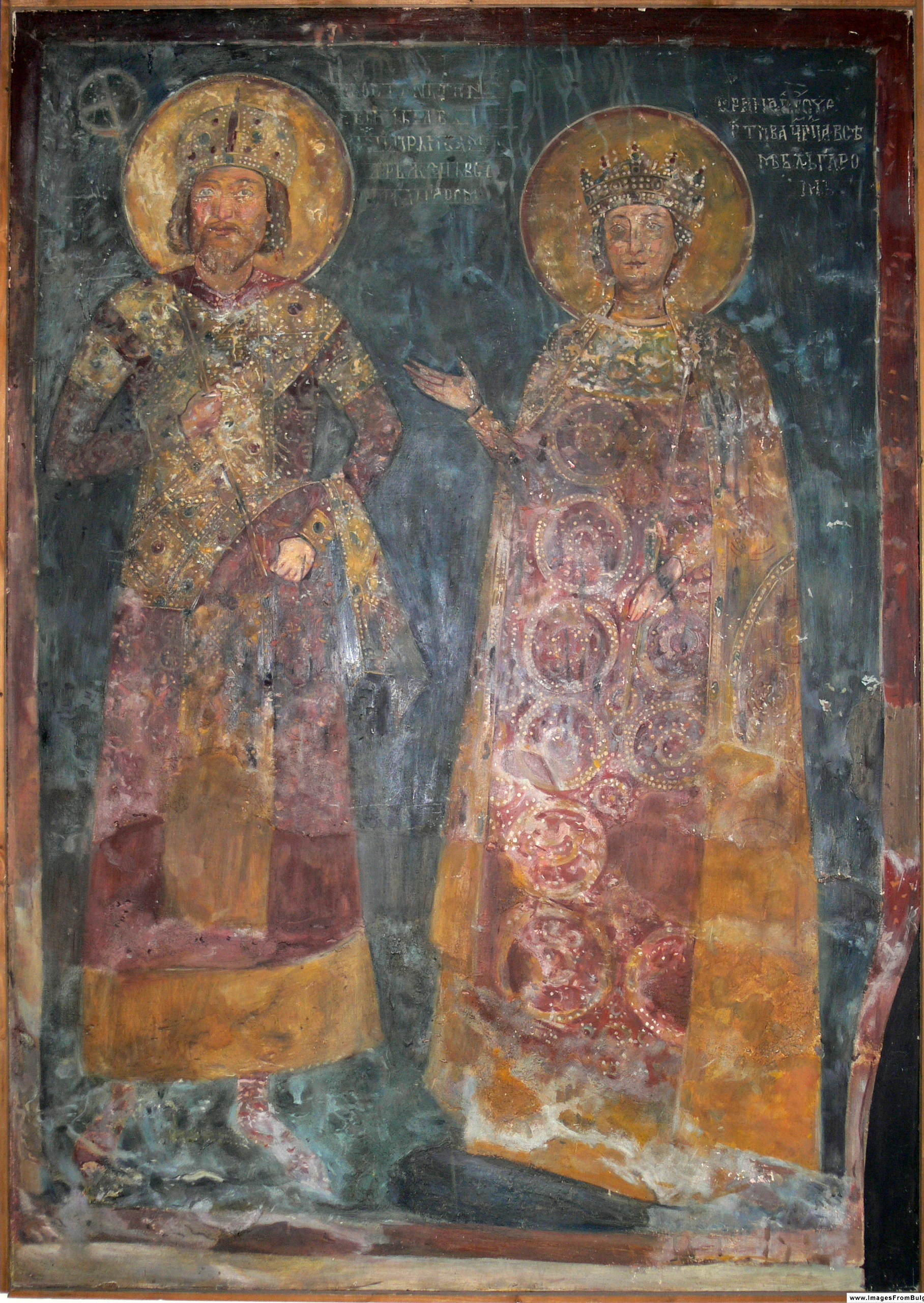
A 13th century fresco in Boyana Church, depicting Tsar Constantine I Tih and Tsarina Irene Laskarina

On 25 July 1261, the Nicaeans recaptured Constantinople from the forces of the Latin Empire, restoring the Byzantine Empire. In December of the same year, Michael VIII deposed and blinded his Co-Emperor John IV, ending the Laskarid dynasty. Irene Laskarina, wife of Constantine I Tih was the sister of the deposed John IV, and she encouraged Constantine I to attack Michael VIII in order to avenge her brother. Further diplomatic strain may have been caused by the Byzantine overtures towards Mitso Asen, a former Bulgarian Tsar who ruled from Mesembria, as a potential alliance between the two would threaten the position of Constantine I Tih. Consequently, hostilities broke out between the Byzantines and the Bulgarian Empire, which had previously been allied to Nicaea, following the usurpation by Michael VIII. In 1262, Constantine I's armies attacked Thrace and captured a number of settlements, including Stanimaka and Philippopolis, which had been taken from the Bulgarian Empire by the Nicaeans between 1246 and 1255.

== Byzantine–Bulgarian warfare in 1263 ==
=== Thrace ===
In 1263, Michael VIII initiated a large-scale response to the Bulgarian incursions, organising a series of expeditions into Bulgarian territory. When the emperor was familiar with the terrain in which his generals campaigned, he would issue precise orders to them on when and how to conduct sieges and battles, while for territories in which he was not familiar with, he would task military men accustomed to the area to draw maps so as to achieve the same. Despite his personal absence from the front line, Michael VIII directed manoeuvres so meticulously that his orders specified the direction from which to approach the enemy, whether the Bulgarians were to be engaged in pitched battles or ambushes, and whether to attack them by day or by night. Michael VIII instilled rigid disciplinary measures, threatening severe punishment for any disobedient commanders, in order to ensure the operations were conducted efficiently.

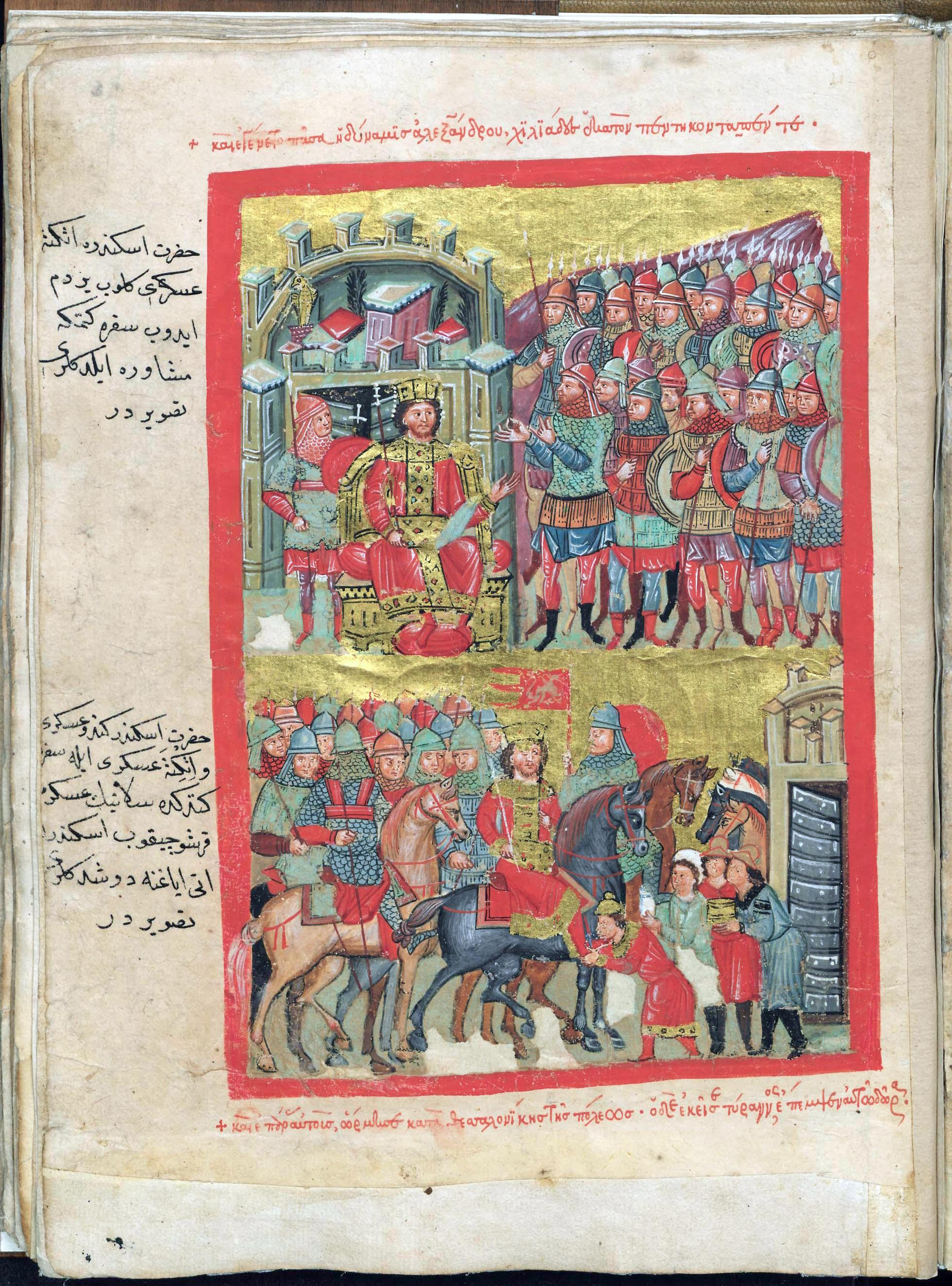
14th-century manuscript of the Alexander Romance. The attire may reflect the fashions and equipment used by Byzantine soldiers during the early Palaiologan period

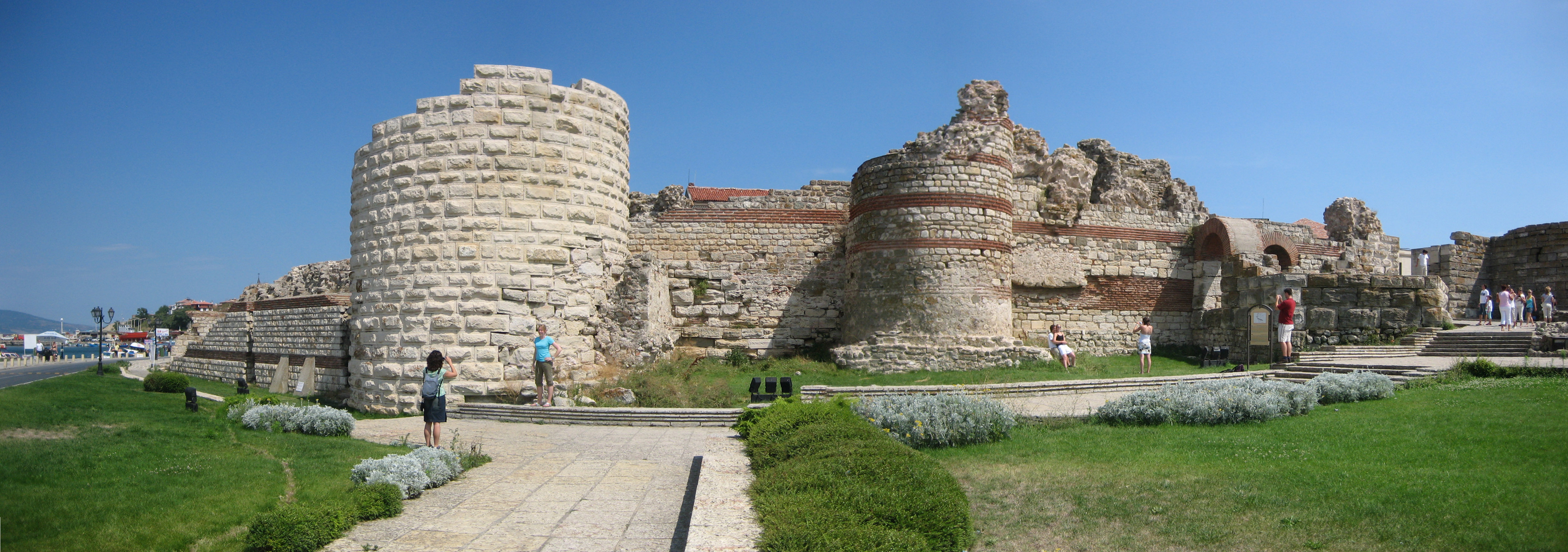
Medieval fortifications at Nesebar (historically Mesembria)

The direct commander over all or part of the army was Michael Glabas Tarchaneiotes, and with strict adherence to the commands of the emperor, the Byzantines achieved great success. In the course of the fighting, they inflicted heavy defeats upon the Bulgarians in battles, including a battlefield victory achieved by Tarchaneiotes near Bizye, which enabled them to make major territorial gains. The poet Manuel Philes described the damage sustained by the Bulgarians during these operations, with Constantine I's forces being "reduced to ash" and large numbers of captive Bulgarian warriors being thrown off cliffs to drown in the Black Sea. Constantine I himself was wounded during the fighting. Tarchaneiotes was able to capture Rusokastro and secure the strategically important city of Mesembria. The ruler of Mesembria, Mitso Asen, negotiated the surrender of the city following a siege, under an agreement that the Byzantines provide him an estate on the Troad in Asia Minor. During the same campaign, the settlements of Anchialus, Agathopolis, Sozopolis, and Debeltos were also taken from the Bulgarians, while the Byzantines refortified Brysis.

=== Western Bulgaria, and Hungarian intervention ===
Like a burning flame, [Tarchaneiotes] descended upon Svestoslav

— Manuel Philes

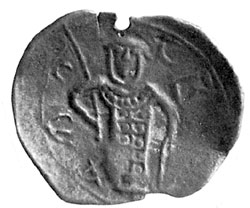
13th century coin minted in the image of Jacob Svetoslav

Following his successes in Thrace, Tarchaneiotes advanced against the territories of Western Bulgaria, recapturing Philippopolis and Stanimaka, before pressing further into the territory controlled by Jacob Svetoslav. (Note: Jacob Svetoslav was either ethnically Russian or descended from a Russian. Following the destruction of Kievan Rus' by the Mongol Empire, large numbers of displaced Russians and Cumans from the Pontic Steppe were granted refuge in Bulgaria by Ivan Asen II and provided with lands to settle on. By 1263, Constantine I and Jacob Svetoslav's retinues were thus likely to contain Russian and Cuman troops, as well as Bulgarians. Svetoslav's territories, which were situated to the south of Vidin province, contained especially substantial numbers of settled Russians and Cumans, and he ruled these semi-autonomous regions as a despot, being of the most powerful political and military figures in Bulgaria by 1263.) Tarchaneiotes conducted a rapid attack against Svetoslav and defeated him, before taking Skopos, along with several other fortresses. Unable to resist the Byzantines with his own strength, Svetsolav was forced to seek aid from the Kingdom of Hungary, switching his allegiance from Constantine I to become a vassal of Duke Stephen. In spite of domestic political strife with his father, King Béla IV at the time, Stephen was able to offer military support to Svetoslav, and even crowned himself as the Tsar of Bulgaria.

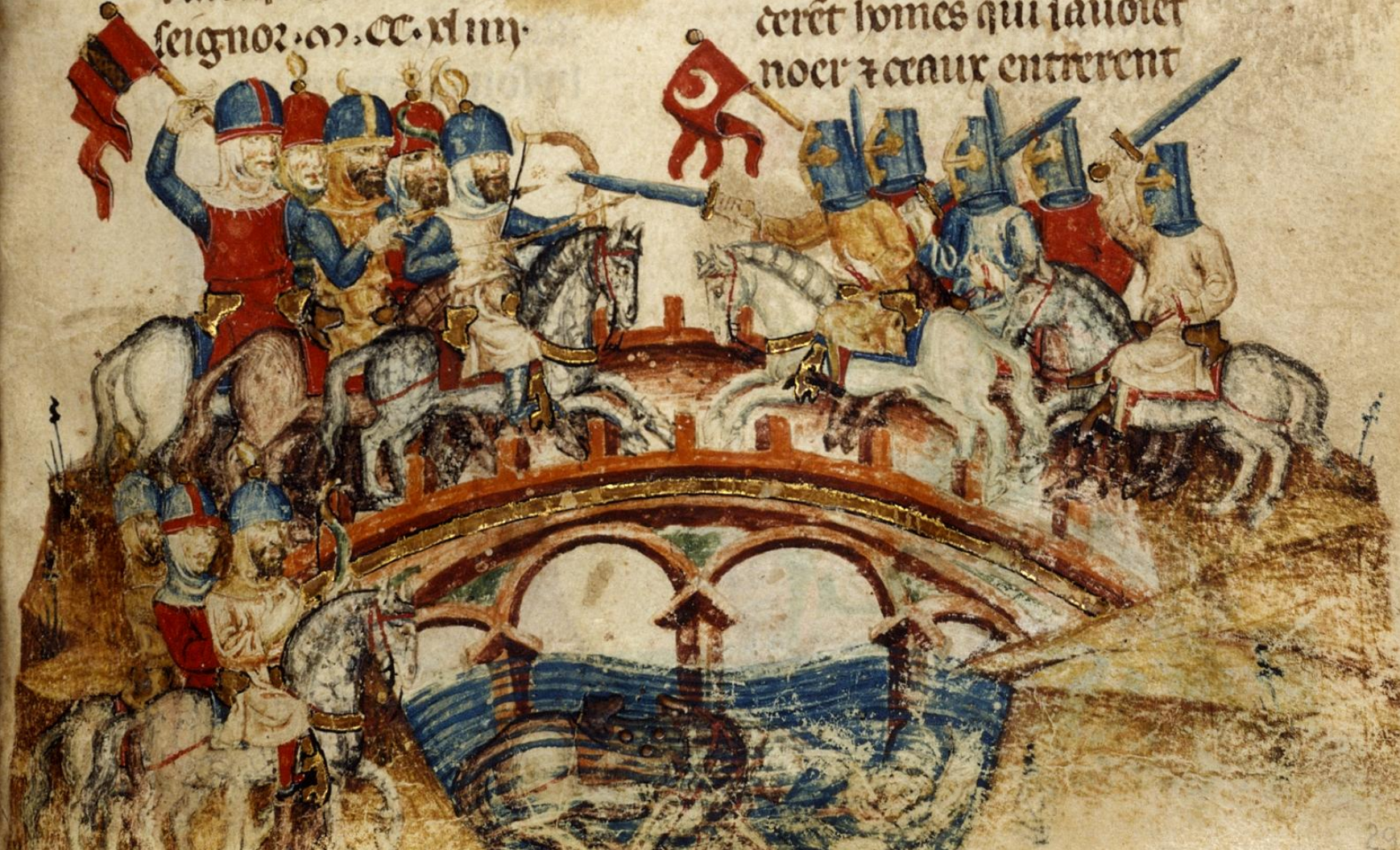
13th century miniature in La Flor des estoires de la terre d'Orient depicting Hungarian knights (right of image)

The Hungarians mobilized a sizeable army, chiefly drawn from Transylvania and Severin, under Voivode Ladislaus Kán and Ban Alexander Karászi to assist the boyar. With Ladislaus' support, Svetsolav was able to secure his holdings in Bulgaria following Tachaneiotes' withdrawal, both against the Byzantines and the Bulgarian forces of Constantine Tih. As the bulk of the Byzantine forces had been transferred southwards to engage the Latins and Epirotes following their victory over Bulgaria, Ladislaus was able to raid territories in Greece with limited opposition. He routed a Greek contingent he encountered after a hard fought and costly battle, in which Karászi distinguished himself with his bravery. (Note: Due to an alliance with Hungary negotiated by Michael VIII in 1259, Eugen Darko proposed that Greek territories Ladislaus attacked were those of the Despotate of Epirus in 1263, and that the attacks were conducted in support of the Byzantines. However, most scholars have reasoned instead that the attacks were directed against the restored Byzantine Empire, and that Hungary breached the agreement of 1259.) At the same time as they engaged the Byzantines, the Hungarians also moved against the Bulgarian Empire, as Vidin fell to Svetoslav.

=== Dobruja ===
Black Sea coastline of Dobruja

In a 1263 panegyric dedicated to Michael VIII, the orator Manuel Holobolos described a situation in which territories in Paristrion broke off from the Bulgarian Empire and submitted to the Byzantines. Modern historians consider this passage to indicate a restoration Byzantine rule over Dobruja. The discovery of significant quantities of coins struck in the image of Michael VIII, compared to a smaller proportion of coins of Constantine I, reinforces this narrative. It is likely that, along with the reoccupation of Mesembria and other port cities along the Black Sea coast, the Byzantine navy also extended its operations to the mouth of the Danube, transporting forces that captured Isaccea, Vicina and other nearby locations to secure control over Dobruja. The Byzantine forces which occupied Dobruja included auxiliaries of Turkoman origin, under the command of the seljuk nobleman Kīr Khāya. Byzantine rule over the Danube Delta lasted until 1352, when the ports were lost to the Genoese. (Note: These men served the former Sultan of Rum, Izz ad-Dīn Kaykaus II and fled with him to the Byzantine Empire following his defeat against the Mongols in 1261. Kīr Khāya was one of Kaykaus' uncles.)

== Result ==
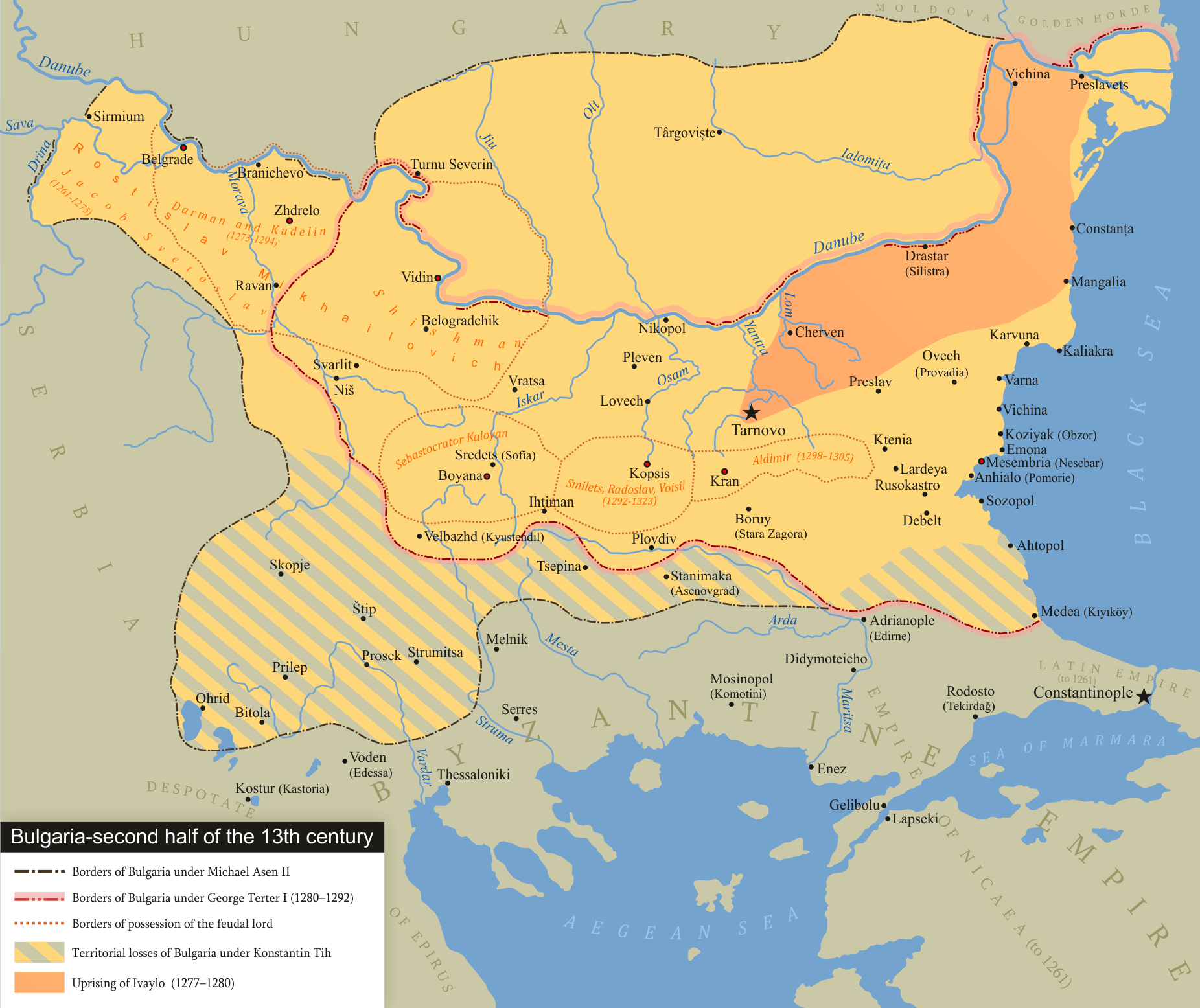
The Second Bulgarian Empire in the second half of the 13th century

The effectiveness of the counterattack against Bulgaria in 1263 displayed the military potential of the resurgent Byzantine Empire, including its ability to wage war on multiple fronts simultaneously. (Note: In 1263, the Byzantines deployed two armies against Bulgaria (one under Michael Glabas Tarchaneiotes which attacked from the southeast, and another which attacked Dobruja at the same time), while another army under Constantine Palaiologos engaged the Latin Achaeans in the Peloponnese, though this campaign resulted in failure at the Battle of Prinitza. A further army under John Palaiologos campaigned with success against the Despotate of Epirus in the same year, before being transferred to Asia Minor to counter the Turkic Beyliks later that year.) The offensives led to considerable territorial gains, as the Byzantines recaptured most of the land between Mesembria and the Tundzha, and all of the regions south of the Maritsa. With direct connection between Constantinople and Mesembria established, along with the occupation of Dobruja, Bulgaria lost control over much of its Black Sea coastal regions. The exploits of Michael Glabas Tarchaneiotes were of particular significance, and for his efforts he received numerous military commands against Byzantium's enemies over the next four decades. Due to Tarchaneiotes' victories in 1263, as well as further successes against the Bulgarians in 1278-1279 and 1304, Manuel Philes dedicated panegyrics to him, and frescoes of his military victories against Bulgaria were raised in the Pammakaristos Church, which Michael and his family had funded.

== Aftermath ==
Following his defeats in 1263, Constantine I Tih was forced to turn to the Mongols of the Golden Horde to provide military aid for a counterattack. An opportunity for this came in late 1264, when the outbreak of the civil war between Duke Stephen and King Béla IV alleviated Bulgaria from the Hungarian military pressure. Furthermore, the former Sultan of Rum, Kaykaus II, who had been imprisoned at Ainos for his role in a conspiracy against Michael VIII, sought the assistance of the Bulgarians and Mongols to secure his release. Kīr Khāya contacted Constantine I on Kaykaus' behalf, who relayed the plea to Nogai Khan. In the winter between 1264 and 1265, while the majority of Byzantine forces had been transferred to the Morea or Asia Minor, Constantine I was reinforced by 20,000 Mongol allies and initiated a campaign into Thrace, aiming to kill or capture Michael VIII to avenge the previous humiliations. Kīr Khāya's auxiliary Turkoman troops stationed in Dobruja defected from the Byzantines and joined the Mongol-Bulgarian attack. Although still suffering from wounds received in 1263, Constantine I personally participated in the resulting invasion, which successfully ambushed the scattered Byzantine units the allied columns encountered and forced the garrison at Ainos to release Kaykaus following the siege. Despite these successes, Michael VIII narrowly managed to elude capture, and as the Mongols withdrew over the Danube following the agreement with the Byzantines reached at Ainos, the Bulgarian Empire was unable to recover much of the territory lost in 1263.

The Bulgarian-Mongol success in 1265 enabled Constantine I to direct Bulgarian military efforts against the Hungarians. With Stephen's hold over Western Bulgaria hampered by his ongoing civil war, Jacob Svetoslav defected back to the Bulgarian side and conducted a raids across the Danube into Severin on Constantine's behalf. However, following his victory over King Béla in the civil war, Stephen responded in force. In June 1266, Stephen conducted an offensive and defeated the combined forces of Svetoslav and Constantine I. The Bulgarian capital, Tarnovo, was sacked by Stephen and Jacob Svetoslav was forced to resubmit, though he was allowed to retain Vidin as a Hungarian vassal.

== Bibliography ==
=== Primary sources ===
- Miller, E. (1857). E. Miller (ed.). Manuelis Philae Carmina: ex codicibus Escurialensibus, Florentinis, Parisinis et Vaticanis (in Greek). Vol. 2. Paris: Excusum in Typographeo Imperiali.
- Georges Pachymérès (1984). Albert Failler (ed.). Relations historiques. Vol. 1: Livres I–III. Translated by Vitalien Laurent. Paris: Les Belles Lettres.

=== Secondary sources ===
- Trapp, Erich; Beyer, Hans-Veit; Kaplaneres, Sokrates; Leontiadis, Ioannis (1991). "27504. Ταρχανειώτης, Μιχαὴλ ∆ούκας Γλαβᾶς". Prosopographisches Lexikon der Palaiologenzeit (in German). Vol. 11. Vienna: Verlag der Österreichischen Akademie der Wissenschaften. ISBN 3-7001-3003-1.
- Engel, Pál; Ayton, Andrew (2001-02-23). The Realm of St Stephen: A History of Medieval Hungary, 895-1526. Bloomsbury Publishing. ISBN 978-0-85773-173-9.
- Fine, J. (1987). The Late Medieval Balkans, A Critical Survey from the Late Twelfth Century to the Ottoman Conquest. University of Michigan Press. ISBN 0-472-10079-3.
- Madgearu, Alexandru (2016). The Asanids: The Political and Military History of the Second Bulgarian Empire, 1185–1280. BRILL. p. 153. ISBN 978-9-004-32501-2.
- Kaldellis, Anthony (2023). The New Roman Empire: A History of Byzantium. New York: Oxford University Press. ISBN 978-0197549322.
- Dimitrov, Hristo (1998). Българо-унгарски отношения през Средновековието [Bulgarian-Hungarian Relations in the Middle Ages] (in Bulgarian). Sofia: Академично издателство „Проф. Марин Дринов“.
- Densușianu, Nicolae (1887). Documente privitoare la istoria românilor (in Romanian). Vol. I. București: Socec & Teclu.
- Treadgold, Warren (1997). A History of the Byzantine State and Society. Stanford, California: Stanford University Press. ISBN 978-0804779371.
- Rădvan, Laurențiu (2010). At Europe's Borders: Medieval Towns in the Romanian Principalities. Brill. ISBN 9789004180109..
- Vásáry, István (2005). Cumans and Tatars: Oriental Military in the Pre-Ottoman Balkans, 1185–1365. Cambridge: Cambridge University Press. ISBN 0521837561.
- Wilskman, Juho (2026). Military History of Byzantine Rome, 1204-1261. Pen and Sword. ISBN 978 1 39904 762 3.
- Shukurov, Rustam (2016). The Byzantine Turks, 1204–1461. BRILL. ISBN 9789004307759.
- Kyriakidis, Savvas (2011). Warfare in Late Byzantium, 1204–1453. Brill. pp. 190–191.
