= Magazberd =

Archaeological site in Turkey

Coordinates: 40.47537°N 43.54156°E

Magazberd or Maghasberd (Armenian: Մաղասաբերդ) is an archaeological site in Turkey's Kars Province, southwest of the ruined city of Ani. It consists of an Armenian castle and city, with a contemporary Ottoman cemetery in the narrow valley to the north.

== Magazberd Castle ==
Magazberd Castle
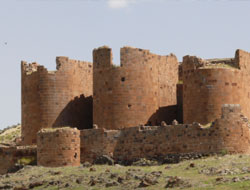
- View of Magazberd Castle's three main towers, October 2011
- Interactive map of the Magazberd Castle area

General information
- Status: ruined
- Type: Castle
- Location: Kars Province, Turkey
- Owner: Turkish State (Ministry of Culture and Tourism, under the control of the Turkish Armed Forces)

Technical details
- Material: Tuff

Magazberd Castle is an Armenian fortress located on a rocky outcrop at a bend of the Akhuryan River.

=== History ===
The site may have originated as early as the 6th century, though most of the surviving structure dates to the period of the Bagratid Kingdom of Armenia (885–1045), and the Ottoman Empire (1299–1922). Its importance grew after Ani became the Armenian capital in 961, with Magazberd and nearby fortresses such as Tignis forming part of the city's defensive network. The castle was later held by the Seljuks following their invasion of Anatolia, passed into Georgian control at the end of the 12th century, and came under the rule of the Hatunoğulları dynasty during the Mongol invasions of the 1350s. In 1579 it was captured by the Ottomans, who maintained it until its decline in the mid-19th century.

Today, the ruins of Magazberd Castle lie near the Kurdish village of Üçbölük in eastern Turkey, within a designated first-degree military restricted zone. Access to the site is limited due to this restriction.

=== Description ===
The fortress is constructed of finely cut tuff stone and is reinforced by three large towers, which mostly remain standing. Its northern gate bears an inscription dated 1579, recording that the castle was rebuilt under Sultan Murad III following the restoration of Kars Castle by Lala Mustafa Pasha. Inside the fortress remain the ruins of stone-built houses, chapels, a palace, a bathhouse and a large square-shaped reservoir.

== Magazberd City ==
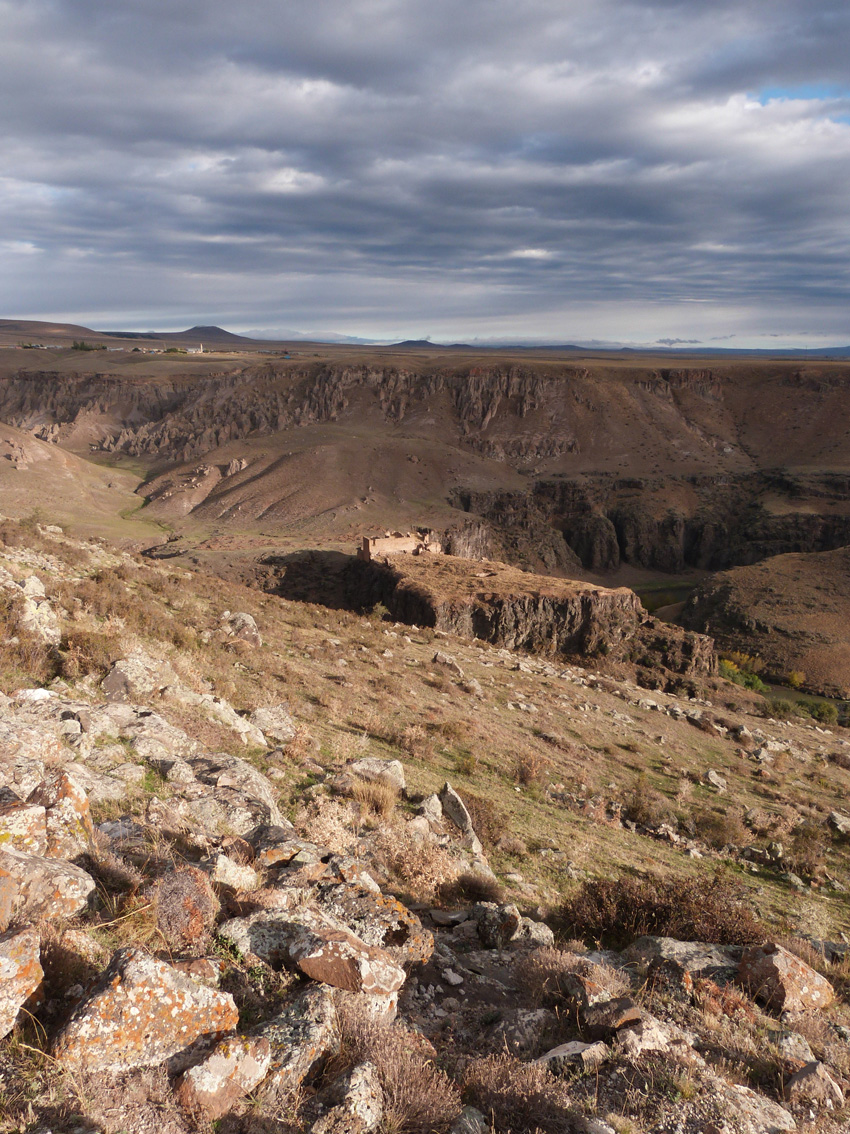
Magazberd Castle, as seen from the City of Magazberd

During studies conducted in 2004–2005, a city was uncovered about 100 meters above the river, which has been nicknamed Old Magazberd. It had a favorable position, with an entrance opening of 3.5 meters. This still little-studied site preserves remains of an urban wall with cylindrical, quadrangular, and horseshoe-shaped towers, as well as the leveled ruins of several civil buildings and a church.
