= Battle of Sivrihisar =

Seljuk–Ilkhanid battle

- Part of the Mongol invasions of Anatolia
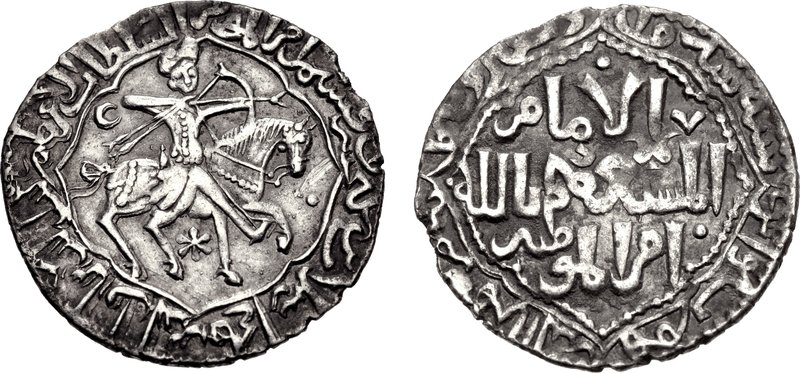
- Dirham depicting the Sultan Kilij Arslan IV
Date	1261 or 1262 (Note: Shukurov attempts to date the battle to 1262, but Korobeĭnikov rejects this on the basis Ibn Abd al-Zahir's al-Rawd al-zāhir. This chronicle described the overtures made by the exiled Kaykaus II to the Mamluk Sultanate for potential military aid, and also confirmed that these were sent from Nicaea before the Reconquest of Constantinople in July 1261.)
Location	Sivrihisar, modern Eskişehir
Result	Ilkhanate - Kilij Arslan IV victory

Belligerents
Ilkhanate; Seljuks supporting Kilij Arslan IV	Seljuks supporting Kaykaus II; Supported by: Empire of Nicaea or Byzantine Empire

Commanders and leaders
Kilij Arslan IV; Alijaq	Ali Bahadur; Ugurlu

Strength
Unknown	Unknown

The Battle of Sivirhisar was the final military engagement of the civil war between the sultan of Rum ruler Izz ad-din Kaykaus II and his brother, Rukn al-Din Kilij Arslan IV, an Ilkhanid vassal and rival claimant to the throne. Kaykaus II's general, Ali Bahadur, had prepared a campaign aimed at removing Kilij Arslan IV and restoring Iconium to the rule of Kaykaus II, but the Ilkhanids were able to reinforce their vassal and engage Bahadur. The resulting battle fought near Sivrihisar ended with the decisive victory of Kilij Arslan IV and the Ilkhanids that ended the civil war, forcing Kaykaus II to abandon the Sultanate of Rum forever and flee to Byzantine territory. The battle took place either in 1261 or 1262.

== Background ==
In 1256, the Sultan Kaykaus II had been defeated by the Mongol general Baiju Noyan at the Battle of Aksaray, which led to the division of the Sultanate of Rum between him and his brother Kilij Arslan IV, by decree of Hulegu Khan. Retaining the southwestern areas of Rum under his control, Kaykaus II sought to rebuild his poistion and turned to the Empire of Nicaea and its Emperor, Theodore II Laskaris, for military aid. This endeavour proved successful, and the sultan was provided with an army of 3,000 Nicaean troops from the emperor, with which he returned to Iconium and reoccupied the city, following Baiju's withdrawal. Kaykaus II then attempted to form an alliance with the ruler of Melitene against Baiju, but these infringements brought about another incursion by Baiju in April 1257. Baiju attacked through Turkoman-held Galatia and Paphlagonia, until he reached the Black Sea. The Mongols captured Kastamonu and other fortresses, which they handed to Kilij Arslan IV, while also forcing Melitene to submit to their him. However, before Kaykaus II could sustain further territorial losses, Baiju was recalled by Hulegu, returning to northwest Iran to prepare for his campaign against Baghdad.

In late 1257, Kaykaus II attempted a policy of reproachment, both with his brother and his Ilkhanid backers, in order to prevent further Mongol incursions. However, during his visit to the Great Khan Möngke, Kilij Arslan IV dismissed his brother's overtures and, under the influence of his vizier, Moʿin-al-Din Solaymān, persuaded the Mongols to renew their military support to help him consolidate rule over the Sultanate of Rum as an Ilkhanid client, by defeating Kaykaus II decisively. Möngke arranged a marriage between Kilij Arslan IV and the daughter of the Mongol commander Alijaq, and in turn assigned Alijaq and his retinue to assist him. Kilij Arslan and the Mongols forced Kaykaus II to abandon the Sultanate of Rum, as he lacked the forces to repulse them. However, Kaykaus II moved into the territory of "Aor Khan of Rum" (possibly the Byzantine ruler), with whom he concluded an alliance. Strengthened by Aor Khan's 'Byzantine' forces, Kaykaus II attacked and defeated the Mongol army. Following this victory, Kaykaus II managed to retake some of the previously lost territories. According to Minhaj-i Siraj Juzjani, Kilij Arslan was taken prisoner by Kaykaus following the defeat of the Mongols and imprisoned in a castle, but eventually succeeded in escaping captivity and fleeing to his Ilkhanid allies. These events transpired before the end of 1260, when Ṭabaḳāt-i-Nāṣirī was written.

== Ali Bahadur's campaign and Battle of Sivrihisar ==
Map of Anatolia under Ilkhanid overlordship and the restored Byzantine Empire to its west

Kaykaus II remained in Attaleia following his initial victory, as Michael VIII Palaiologos had advised him to do for his safety against the Mongols, but to further exploit his success, he assigned a subordinate named Ali Bahadur to conduct a counteroffensive against his brother, with the aim of toppling Kilij Arslan IV and recapturing Iconium once again. Kaykaus II also contacted Michael Palaiologos and requested conset for a place of refuge in Byzantium, in case he was defeated in the civil war.

In 1261, Ali Bahadur mustered a powerful army at Sivrihisar, with the objective of besieging Kilij Arslan IV in Iconium. With this large force, he advanced into Rukn ad-Din's territory and invested the capital. However, Bahadur was ultimately unable to capture the city, and withdrew to Sivrihisar. After regrouping and receiving reinforcements from his Ilkhanid allies, Kilij Arslan IV set out to conduct a counteroffensive. Kilij Arslan IV's Mongol and Turkoman forces met and defeated the army of his brother, led by Ali Bahadur and Ugurlu, in a battle at Sivrihisar. Kaykaus' commanders survived this defeat, and fled to nearby Anatolian beyliks to find sanctuary amongst the Uch beys, before reuniting with their sultan in Constantinople.

== Aftermath ==
The victory of the Ilkhanids and their Seljuk client at Sivrihisar marked the final defeat of Kaykaus II in the civil war for the Sultanate of Rum. With his ambitions dashed, Kaykaus II fled from Attaleia to seek refuge in Byzantium. Michael VIII Palaiologos granted the fugitive sultan refuge and treated him with the dignity of an equal ruler, while Kaykaus II and followers attended Christian ceremonies in Constantinople, with some of them converting during this time, including the sultan himself. Kaykaus II also attempted to seek alliances with other powers such as the Mamluk Sultanate and Golden Horde, sending his own sister in marriage to the Golden Horde Khan Berke. However, amidst the Arsenite Schism, relations between Michael VIII and Kaykaus II started to break down, and after a plot by Kaykaus II to depose Michael VIII was revealed the deposed sultan was arrested and imprisoned at Ainos. Nevertheless, in 1264, Kaykaus II made contact with Constantine I Tih, the Bulgarian vassal of Berke, and through him relay a request for aid from Berke of the Golden Horde. This plea succeeded, and after an invasion of Thrace by the Horde, Kaykaus II was rescued and accompanied to Crimea, where Berke gave his daughter in marriage to the former sultan.

== Bibliography ==
=== Primary sources ===
- Jūzjānī, Minhāj Sirāj (1881). Ṭabaḳāt-i-Nāṣirī: A General History of the Muḥammadan Dynasties of Asia, Including Hindūstān, from A.H. 194 (810 A.D.) to A.H. 658 (1260 A.D.) and the Irruption of the Infidel Mughals into Islām. Vol. 1–2. Translated by Raverty, Henry George. London: Asiatic Society of Bengal.

=== Secondary sources ===
- May, Timothy (2016). "Mongol Conquest Strategy in the Middle East". In De Nicola, Bruno; Melville, Charles (eds.). The Mongols' Middle East: Continuity and Transformation in Ilkhanid Iran. Leiden: Brill. ISBN 978-9-0043-1472-6.
- Vryonis, Speros (1971). The Decline of Medieval Hellenism in Asia Minor and the Process of Islamization from the Eleventh through the Fifteenth Century. University of California Press. ISBN 0-520-01597-5.
- Shukurov, Rustam (2016). The Byzantine Turks, 1204–1461. BRILL. ISBN 9789004307759.
- Korobeĭnikov, Dimitri (2014). Byzantium and the Turks in the Thirteenth Century. Oxford University Press. ISBN 978-0-19-870826-1.
- Nayır, Şeyhmus (2022). "Military Aid from the Seljuk State of Türkiye to the Byzantine Empire Campaigns in the Balkans". Güneydoğu Avrupa Araştırmaları Dergisi (in Turkish) (39): 99–143.
- Peacock, Andrew (2010). "Saljuqs iii. Saljuqs of Rum". Encyclopaedia Iranica.
- Wilksman, Juho (2026). Military History of Byzantine Rome, 1204-1261. Pen and Sword. ISBN 978 1 39904 762 3.
- Jackson, Peter (2014) [2005]. The Mongols and the West, 1221-1410. London and New York: Routledge. ISBN 9781317878995.
- Kaldellis, Anthony (2023). The New Roman Empire: A History of Byzantium. Oxford University Press. ISBN 978-0197549322.
- de Nicola, Bruno (2017). Women in Mongol Iran: the Khātūns, 1206–1335. Edinburgh: Edinburgh University Press. ISBN 978-1-4744-1548-4.
- Shukurov, Rustam (2014). "Sultan 'Izz al-Dīn Kaykāwus II in Byzantium (1262-1264/1265)". Der Doppeladler. Byzanz und die Seldschuken in Anatolien vom späten 11. bis zum 13. Jahrhundert. Verlag des Römisch-Germanischen Zentralmuseums. ISBN 978-3-88467-235-8.
