= Battle of Bizye (1256) =

1256 battle

- Part of the Byzantine–Bulgarian wars and the Struggle for Constantinople
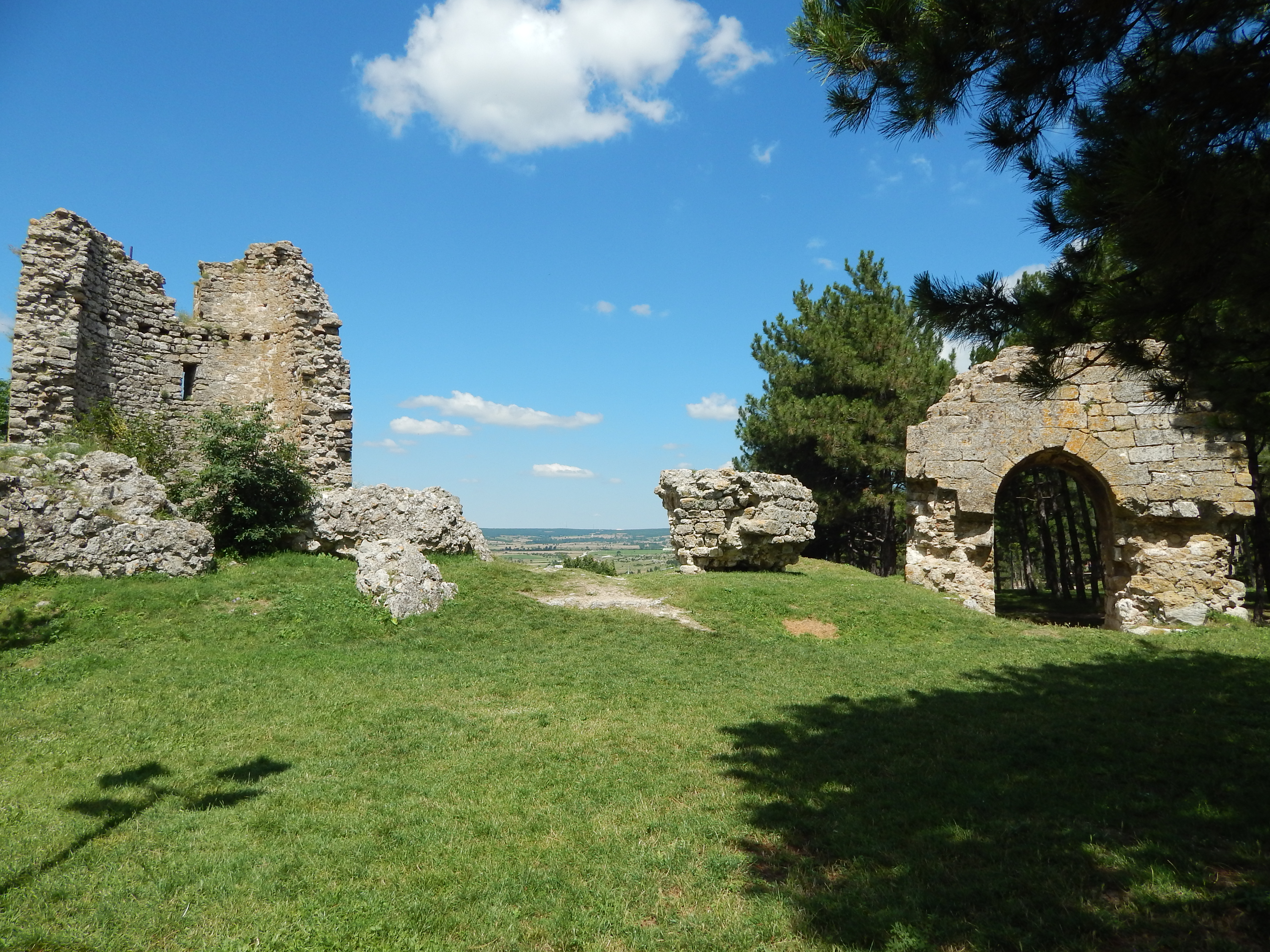
- Castle ruins in Bizye
Date	1256
Location	Vize, modern Turkey
Result	Nicaean victory

Belligerents
Cumans; Supported by: Bulgarian Empire	Empire of Nicaea

Commanders and leaders
Unknown	Theodore II Laskaris

Strength
4,000 Cumans	5,000+ (only cavalry engaged)

Casualties and losses
Very Heavy	Unknown

The Battle of Bizye was a military engagement that occurred in 1256, during a lightning campaign conducted by the Nicaean Emperor Theodore II Laskaris against a Bulgarian-sponsored incursion into Thrace by Cuman warriors. Responding to an earlier defeat of Nicaean forces by the Cumans, Theodore led his cavalry in a rapid march, which managed to catch the swift-moving nomads. The Cumans were defeated and several of their chieftains were slain.

== Background ==
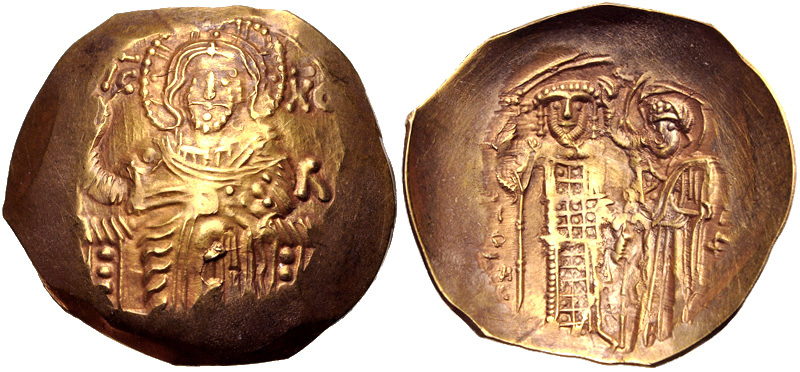
Hyperpyron of Emperor Theodore II Laskaris

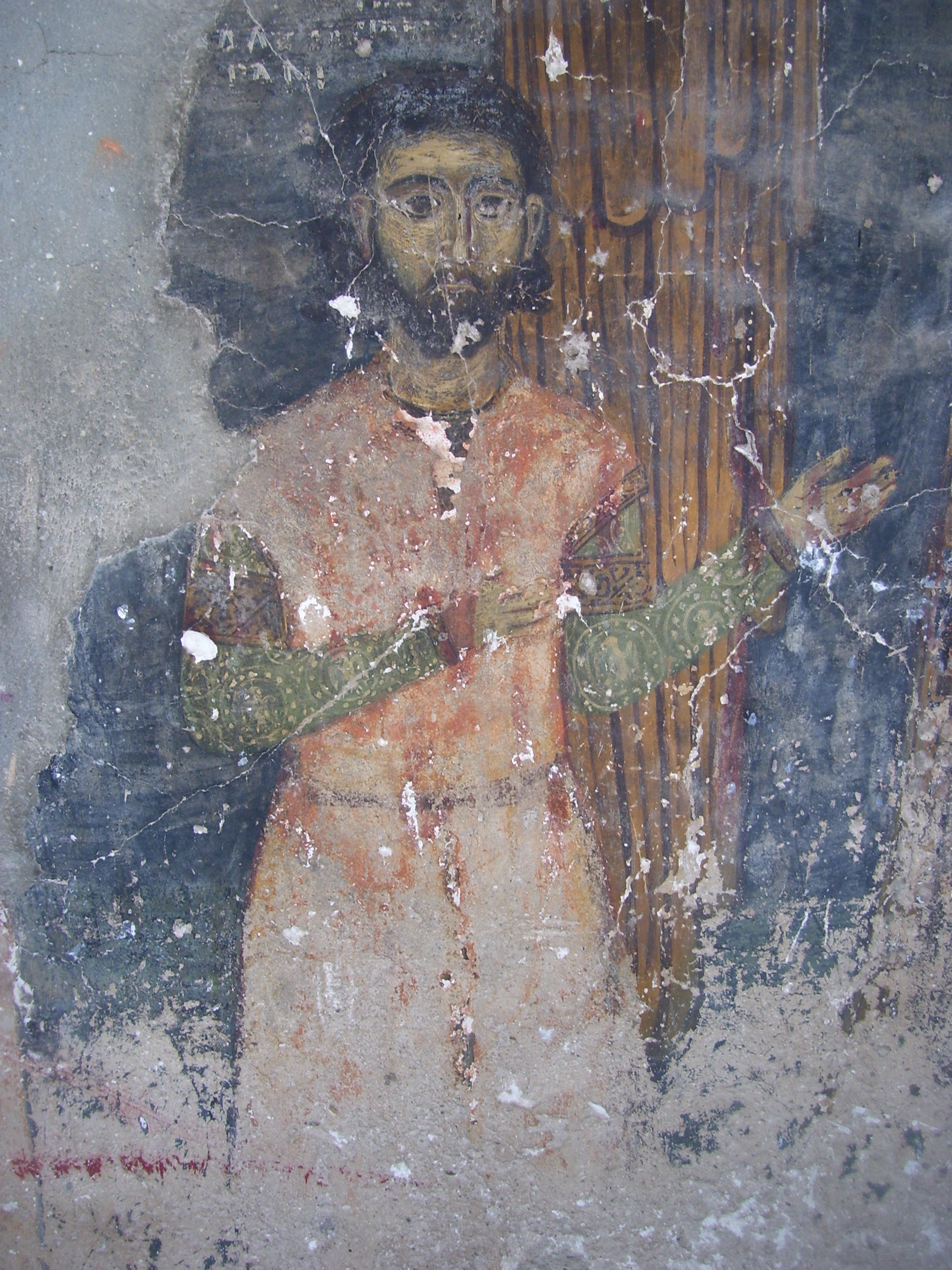
Portrait of Tsar Michael II Asen from the Metropolis of the Agioi Taxiarches in Kastoria

Following his campaigns against the Bulgarians in 1254–1255, Theodore retired with his field army to his powerbase in Western Anatolia, in order to lead a recruitment drive and reinforce his forces with additional men. To guard the point of entrance into Nicaean-held Thrace, the emperor left the military officers Manuel Laskaris and Constantine Margarites with a small force of heavy cavalry, tasking them with the construction of a fortified encampment near Didymoteicho, and ordering them not march out of it to engage in full-scale pitched battles against large enemy forces. The two commanders were only permitted to attack small enemy detachments which raided the region.

With his forces having been worsted in Laskaris' campaigns, the Bulgarian Tsar Michael II Asen sought to exploit the emperor's departure and conduct a counter-invasion into Nicaean territory. For this purpose, he called in an army of 4,000 Cuman allies from north of Bulgaria (anachronistically named Scythians by George Akropolites). By the Tsar's direction, these nomads duly conducted an invasion into Thrace, plundering Nicaean holdings along the Regina river. Contrary to the emperor's orders, Manuel and Constantine led their heavy horsemen out against the Cumans when they approached Didymoteicho. The lighter Cuman horse archers conducted a feigned retreat, evading contact with their enemy, while firing arrows to kill their mounts, forcing the Nicaeans to fight on foot and eventually routing them. Manuel was able to escape thanks to the swiftness of his horse, but Constantine and many others were taken captives and sold as prisoners of war to the Bulgarians.

== Battle ==
By the time of the events, the emperor and his strengthened army were already on their return journey from Anatolia to Thrace. After crossing the Dardanelles and receiving news of the defeat at Didymoteicho, Theodore set out immediately to lead a retaliatory attack against the Cumans. In order to catch the nomads, the emperor detached his army's mounted troops into a separate column and led them on a lightning march to intercept the Cuman host, marching 400 stadia (80–90 km (50–56 mi)) in a single day to reach them, according to Akropolites. By this time, the Cuman army was weighed down by the plunder they had collected while pillaging the area of Rhaidestos, Herakleia and, most recently, Bizye. Consequently, they were unable to evade the rapid advance of the emperor's cavalrymen.

Near Bizye, the Nicaeans engaged the Cumans and soundly defeated them. During this encounter, many of the Cuman chieftains were captured. Enraged by the fate of the Nicaean soldiers at Didymoteicho and the devastation of Thrace by the Cuman raids, Theodore executed them. The surviving Cumans fled, but on the basis of the Synopsis Chronike, the Nicaeans pressed their advantage to pursue them. According to this text, a contingent of Theodore's men under the command of George Nestongos and Kleopas were able to pin many of the retreating Cumans against an unnamed river and forced them into close quarters. These Cumans were either massacred or forced to cross the river, with many nomads drowning in the attempt. (Note: As the engagement near the river is mentioned only by Synopsis Chronike, Juho Wilksman raises the possibility that it may have been a minor engagement or a literary topos, as pinning nomadic horsemen against a river was a common tactic used to defeat them, but over time became a repeated story in literature) As a result of these successes, the Nicaeans retook the spoils taken by the nomads during their raid, while capturing many of their warriors.

== Aftermath ==
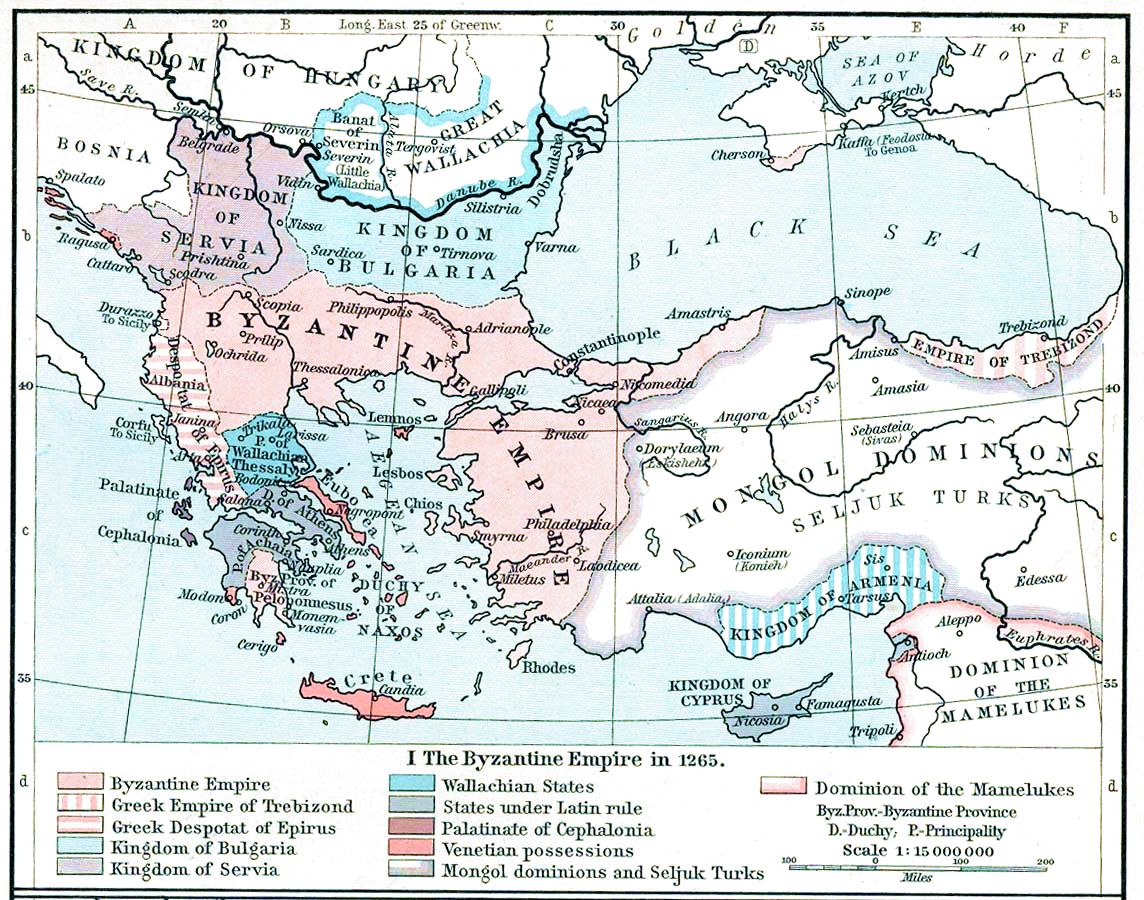
The Empire of Nicaea in 1265

With his attempt to sway the course of the war thwarted by Theodore's victory, Michael Asen now risked a renewed offensive into Bulgaria by the reinforced Nicaean army. To avoid this, Michael offered to open peace negotiations with the Byzantines, with the mediation of the Rus prince Rostislav Mikhailovich. Theodore agreed, and Rostislav successfully negotiated peace between Nicaea and Bulgaria under a status quo treaty. Theodore may have been compelled to settle these relatively lenient terms with Bulgaria in spite of his great success in 1256 due to developments along his eastern frontier, where mounting political tensions between the Sultanate of Rum and Mongols diverted his attention from Europe back to Anatolia. In 1256, a territorial dispute between the Sultan Kaykaus II and the Mongol general Baiju Noyan erupted into open warfare, which culminated in a crushing Seljuk defeat at the Battle of Aksaray. This event resulted in the flight of Kaykaus to seek refuge and military support from Theodore II, but the harbouring of a defeated monarch risked inviting Mongol military reprisals against Nicaea. The situation necessitated precautionary reinforcement and reorganisation of defences on Nicaea's Eastern frontier, which demanded the personal oversight of the emperor.

== Bibliography ==
- Wilksman, Juho (2026). Military History of Byzantine Rome, 1204-1261. Pen and Sword. ISBN 978 1 39904 762 3.
- Kyriakidis, Savvas (2011). Warfare in Late Byzantium, 1204–1453. Brill.
- Kanellopoulos, Nicholas S.; Lekea, Joanne K. (2007). "The Struggle between the Nicean Empire and the Bulgarian State (1254–1256): Towards a Revival of Byzantine Military Tactics under Theodore II Lascaris". In Rogers, Clifford J.; DeVries, Kelly; France, John (eds.). The Journal of Medieval Military History. Vol. V. The Boydell Press. pp. 56–69. ISBN 978-1-84383-339-0.
- Shukurov, Rustam (2016). The Byzantine Turks, 1204–1461. BRILL. ISBN 9789004307759.
