= Battle of Aksaray (1256) =

1256 battle during the Mongol invasions of Anatolia

- Part of the Mongol invasions of Anatolia
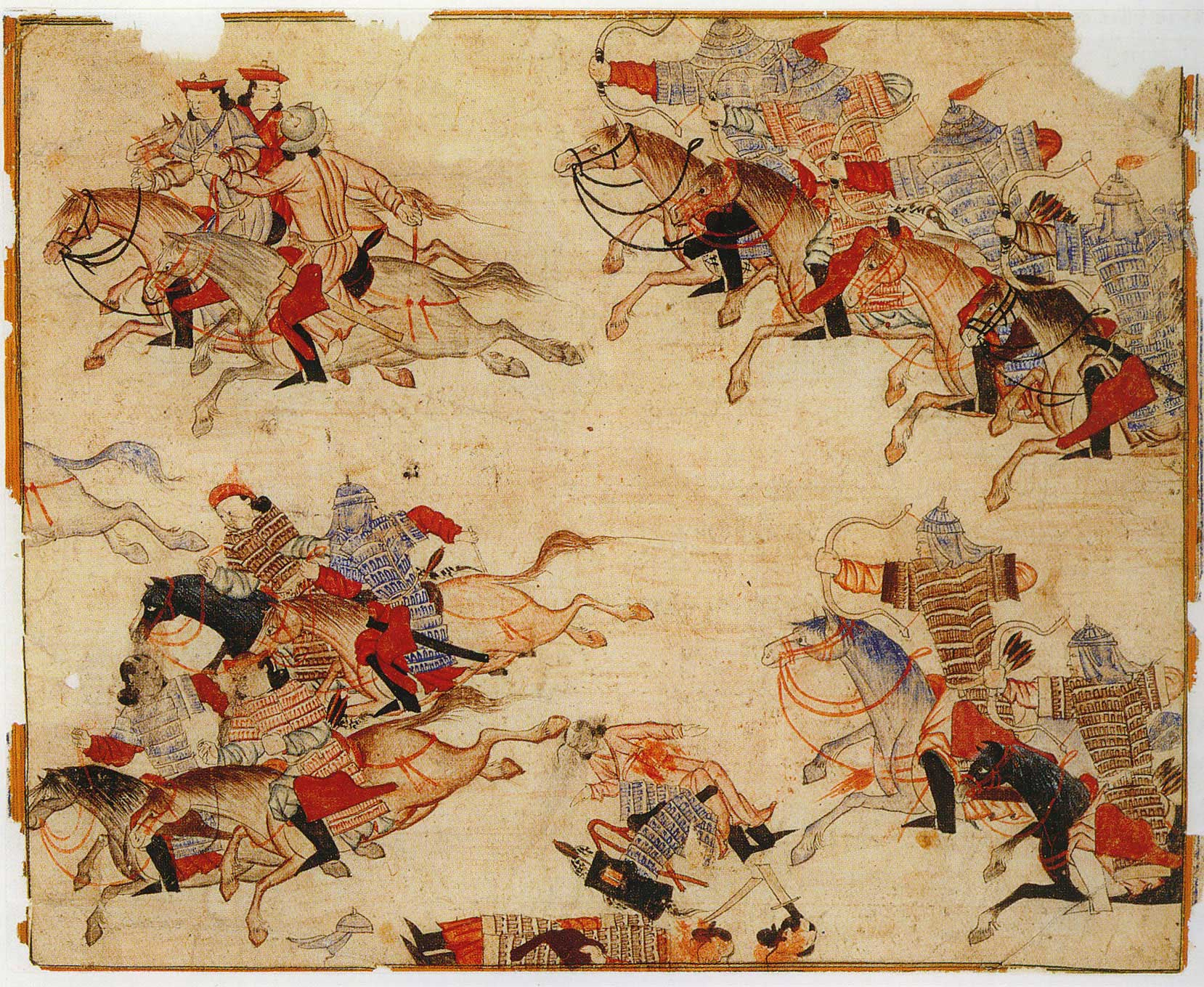
- Mongol cavalry pursues its enemies. Illustration from Rashid al-Din's Gami' at-tawarih.
| Date | 14 October 1256 |
| Location | Sultanhanı, Aksaray 38.25°N 33.55°E |
| Result | Mongol victory |

Belligerents
| Mongol Empire | Sultanate of Rum; Supported by: Empire of Nicaea |

Commanders and leaders
| Baiju Noyan | Kaykaus II; Michael Palaiologos |

Strength
| Unknown | Unknown |

Battle of Aksaray or Battle of Sultanhanı was a military engagement fought in 1256 in Central Anatolia between the forces of the Seljuk Sultan Kaykaus II and an encroaching Mongol army led by Baiju Noyan. The battle was a decisive Mongol victory, which forced Kaykaus to abandon his capital of Konya. Following this defeat, he fled to the land of the Nicaean Emperor Theodore II Laskaris for refuge and military support, which later enabled him to temporarily regain Konya in 1257.

== Background ==
Although the Mongols had first invaded and subjugated the Sultanate of Rum in the early 1240s, their authority did not go unchallenged in Anatolia, particularly following the death of Kaykhusraw II and the subsequent division of the sultanate between his competing sons. In 1251, Baiju Noyan withdrew from Anatolia to campaign in Iraq, which Kaykaus used as an opportunity to defy him. He assembled a force consisting of Turkomans, Arabs and Kurds, and attacked the Mongols near the city of Tokat. However, this effort failed when his brother Kilij Arslan IV, who enjoyed strong support from the Mongols, marched against him and forced him out of the city. In the following years, developments within the Mongol Empire would alter the political dynamic of control over the Anatolian pastures. When Hulegu, brother of the Great Khan Möngke, arrived in Northern Iran in early 1256, he established his headquarters on the fertile Mughan plain, terrain ideally suited for the Mongol cavalry to raise their herds. Baiju was consequently forced westward to seek fertile pasture for his retinues, and he chose the plains of Anatolia as his destination in this migration.

== Battle ==
As Rum was a client state of the Mongol Empire, Baiju at first sent an envoy to Kaykaus in August 1256, requesting that the sultan pay tribute, and that the Turkomans allocate some of their pastures for Baiju's men, along with their horses to use over the winter. Kaykaus rejected this request and refused to assist the Boyan, as he interpreted the displacement of Baiju from Iran by Hugelu's arrival as showing a degradation of Baiju’s significance within Mongol politics. Kaykaus also made preparations to fight Baiju, mustering his forces. In addition to Turkoman cavalry, his forces included a Christian mercenary contingent, over whom he appointed the Nicaean Byzantine captain Michael Palaiologos, who at this time was serving the forces of Rum. Michael's unit even carried the battle standards of the Nicaean emperor, Theodore II Laskaris, while campaigning alongside the Seljuks.

However, the Mongol response to Kaykaus' military infringements was swift and decisive. The arrival of Hugelu in the near east signalled the initiation of a new wave of campaigns throughout the near east, the first of which was a fresh Mongol offensive against the Seljuks of Rum. Baiju Noyan, victor of the battle of Köse Dağ against the Seljuks a decade earlier, advanced against the sultan's forces in late 1256. Baiju met the Seljuk forces near Aksaray on 14 October 1256, and decisively defeated them. However, both Kaykaus and Michael managed to retreat to safety following the battle, reaching the city of Konya. After the defeat at Aksaray, the sultan was in no position to resist the Mongols further, and thus collected his harem and fled west to seek refuge in neighbouring Nicaea. Konya was promptly taken by Baiju, and Kaykaus himself narrowly evaded capture by a pursuing Mongol force.

== Aftermath ==
The Seljuk defeat was a cause of great concern for the Nicaeans, who feared that the presence of their military standards among Michael's contingent in the Seljuk army would draw the ire of the Mongols and provoke them to invade the empire. Theodore II immediately withdrew from the Haemus where he had been campaigning against the Bulgarians and Cumans, and despite recently achieving a great victory over the Bulgarians' Cuman allies at Bizye Theodore was forced to conclude a hasty Status quo peace settlement with the Bulgarian Tsar Michael II Asen in order to better navigate the developing danger in Anatolia. He consequently he assembled a powerful army near Magnesia. Kaykaus II and Michael arrived in Sardis, where they met the emperor, seeking sanctuary and military support against the Mongols. Kaykaus' diplomacy was successful, and the emperor publicly forgave Michael and rescinded his exile from Nicaea, while a contingent of 400 Greek Byzantine lancers under Primmikerios Isaac Doukas Mourtzouphlos, was provided to the sultan, supposedly in return for the concession of the cities of Laodikeia and Chonae, along with the fortresses of Sakaina and Ypsele, to Nicaean rule. (Note: Most of these concessions are mentioned in the Anonymous Synopsis Chronike, but the veracity of the source on the matter is unknown. If the Nicaeans were handed these forts, they returned to Seljuk control by 1259. It is possible that the activities of the Turkoman warlord Mehmed near Laodikeia at this time contributed to the loss of these territories)

In the spring of 1257, the Mongols withdrew from Konya after dismantling its fortifications. Using this opportunity, Kaykaus returned with an army of 3,000 Nicaean troops and reoccupied his capital. However, wary of the military might of the Mongols following his defeat at Aksaray, the sultan quickly submitted to them and promised them tribute in order to retain his regained position. Following these transgressions, a Mongol embassy was dispatched to Nicaea, due to their involvement in the expedition. According to George Pachymeres, Theodore II Laskaris used ploys in order to dissuade the Mongols from conducting a potential invasion of Nicaea. The emissaries were escorted into his realm along the most hostile terrain, while he organized a military parade displaying large quantities of heavily armoured Byzantine troops in disciplined formations, a stratagem giving the impression that Nicaea had a large and powerful military defending its borders. Also in 1257, the Kingdom of Jerusalem received an ultimatum from the Mongols at Acre, disseminating wider concerns of Mongol incursions against Christian polities in Western Asia. The Nicaeans were ultimately spared a full scale Mongol invasion due to the preoccupation of Hulegu, first with the Siege of Baghdad (Note: Baiju accompanied Hülegü during his Mesopotamian campaign, where his column defeated an Abbasid army that sallied out of Baghdad) and subsequently the Kurultai, following the death of Great Khan Möngke during the siege of Song Chinese fortress of Diaoyucheng. However, Kaykaus' grasp on his newly regained position remained precarious, and he ultimately entered into a civil war against his brother Kilij Arslan, who was aided by the Mongols. After a series of clashes, his armies were defeated by Arslan, and by the Mongol general Alijaq, at the battle of Sivrihisar, which forced Kaykaus and his family to flee once again to the Byzantines around the summer of 1262.

== Bibliography ==
- George Akropolites: The History. Translated by Macrides, Ruth. Oxford University Press. 2007. ISBN 978-0-19-921067-1.
- Jackson, Peter (2014) [2005]. The Mongols and the West, 1221-1410. London and New York: Routledge. ISBN 9781317878995.
- May, Timothy (2016). "Mongol Conquest Strategy in the Middle East". In De Nicola, Bruno; Melville, Charles (eds.). The Mongols' Middle East: Continuity and Transformation in Ilkhanid Iran. Leiden: Brill. pp. 13–37. ISBN 978-9-0043-1472-6.
- Macrides, Ruth (2007). George Akropolites: The History – Introduction, Translation and Commentary. Oxford: Oxford University Press. ISBN 978-0-19-921067-1.
- Nicolle, David; Hook, Richard (1998). The Mongol Warlords: Genghis Khan, Kublai Khan, Hulegu, Tamerlane. Brockhampton Press. p. 129. ISBN 978-1-86019-407-8.
- Shukurov, Rustam (2016). The Byzantine Turks, 1204–1461. BRILL. ISBN 9789004307759.
- Vryonis, Speros (1971). The Decline of Medieval Hellenism in Asia Minor and the Process of Islamization from the Eleventh through the Fifteenth Century. University of California Press. ISBN 0-520-01597-5.
- Wilksman, Juho (2026). Military History of Byzantine Rome, 1204-1261. Pen and Sword. ISBN 978 1 39904 762 3.
