= Eljigidei =

Mongol military commander (d. 1251)

Eljigidei Noyan
- ᠡᠯᠵᠢᠭᠲᠡᠢ ᠨᠣᠶᠠᠨ

Viceroy of Mongol Empire in Near East
- In office 1247–1251
- Appointed by: Güyük
- Preceded by: Baiju Noyan
- Succeeded by: Baiju Noyan

Personal details
- Died: 1251

Eljigidei Noyan (Mongolian: ᠡᠯᠵᠢᠭᠲᠡᠢ ᠨᠣᠶᠠᠨ, d. 1251) was a Mongol commander in Persia.

== Career ==
He was a commander of the Kheshig during reign of Ögedei, the second ruler of the Mongol Empire and the third son of Genghis Khan. Following the election of Güyük in 1246, he replaced Baiju, Batu's protégé. He departed from Mongolia in September 1247 and arrived in Talas in April 1248, which coincided with Güyük's death. Upon arrival in Khorasan, he stationed in Badghis region. Supposedly possessed of Christian sympathies like the khan, Eljigidei was ordered to advance into Syria, and planned an advance on Baghdad. This advance was, ideally, to be conducted in alliance with Louis IX of France, in concert with the Seventh Crusade. However, Güyük's sudden death made Eljigidei postpone operations until after the interregnum. Still, Eljigidei wrote a letter from his camp in Khorasan.

Eljigidei never managed to hold real command but only on paper. After the election of Möngke, however, Eljigidei and his two sons were implicated in an aborted conspiracy to declare the election invalid. Though supposedly innocent, Eljigidei was arrested and put to death as well in winter of 1251 or 1252. Baiju was subsequently returned to command in Persia.
