= Kaykaus II =

Sultan of Rum, 1246 to 1262

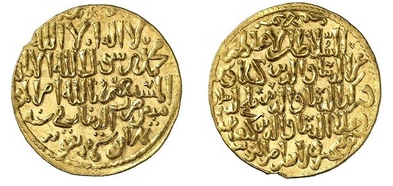
- Golden dinar with the names of the three co-sultans of Rum: Kaykaus II, Kayqubad II, and Kilij Arslan IV

Sultan of Rum
- Reign: 1246–1262
- Predecessor: Kaykhusraw II
- Successor: Kilij Arslan IV
- Co-sultans: Kayqubad II (1249–1254); Kilij Arslan IV (1249–1254) and (1257–1262)
- Born: 1234
- Died: 1279 (aged 44–45); Crimea
- Spouse: Urbay Khatun
- House: House of Seljuq
- Father: Kaykhusraw II
- Mother: Prodoulia
- Religion: Islam; Orthodox Christianity

Kaykaus ibn Kaykhusraw or Kayka'us II (Turkish: İzzeddin Keykavus, Persian: عز الدين كيكاوس بن كيخسرو, ʿIzz ad-Dīn Kaykāwus ibn Kaykhusraw, Greek: ’Ίζ αλ-Ντίν Καϊκαούσης) was the sultan of Rum from 1246 until 1262.

== Biography ==
=== Early life ===
Kaykaus was the eldest of three sons of Kaykhusraw II. His mother was Prodoulia, who was a Byzantine Greek, may have had Kaykaus baptized as a child. It was common for the Christian slave-concubines and wives of the Seljuk harem to baptise their sons.

=== Mongol invasion and civil war ===
He was a youth at the time of his father's death in 1246 and could do little to prevent the Mongol conquest of Anatolia. For most of his tenure as the Seljuk Sultan of Rûm, he shared the throne with one or both of his brothers, Kilij Arslan IV and Kayqubad II. Mongol commander Baiju threatened him and warned him of being late with paying tribute and requested new pastures in Anatolia for the Mongol cavalry. The Mongols defeated Kaykaus at the battle of Aksaray, after which he fled to the Empire of Nicaea in 1257 with his children and followers.

=== Aid from Nicaea ===
He exchanged messages with the Nicaean Emperor Theodore II Laskaris before his arrival and was welcomed in Sardis and given gifts. The Emperor helped Kaykaus regain his lands by giving him a modest force of 400 soldiers under primmikerios Isaac Doukas Mourtzouphlos. In exchange for the aid, Kaykaus returned to the Byzantines Laodicea, Chonae and the two small fortresses of Sakaina and Ypsele. With the forces he was given, he managed to recapture Iconium.

=== Life in Exile ===
Kaykaus ruled for only a few years, as he lost Iconium again on 12 August 1261, and had to flee from Attaleia to Byzantine Constantinople in summer 1262, following his defeat at the Battle of Sivrihisar by Kilij Arslan IV and the Mongol general Alijaq. The Byzantine court welcomed him as before, along with his mother, wife, four sons, daughter, sister, his two maternal uncles Kyr Khāya and Kyr Kattidios, along with his guide, the Metropolitan of Pisidia Makarios, the Sufi Saint Sarı Saltık, the commanders Uğurlu and ‘Alī Bahādur, as well as other other notable members of the court of Rum. The family of the deposed sultan either lived in the capital or were sent to reside in Nicaea.

However, tensions grew between the former Sultan and the new Emperor Michael VIII Palaiologos in the midst of the Arsenite Schism. Kaykaus, convinced by his emirs, formed a conspiracy to depose Michael. After the plot was uncovered, (Note: According to Ibn Bibi, the plot was exposed to Michael by Kyr Kattidios.) Kaykaus tried to escape with two of his sons, but was captured and imprisoned in Ainos, while the rest of his family were sent to Berroia. ‘Alī Bahādur was executed, while Uğurlu and other emirs were blinded for organising the conspiracy, on charges of treason. Kaykaus' brother Kayqubad appealed to Berke Khan and his nephew Nogai of the Golden Horde. The Mongols, Bulgarians and Tatars jointly invaded Thrace in the winter of 1264/1265. Michael's army was chased away and Ainos was besieged. After negotiations, Kaykaus was released and handed over, and in exchange the siege was lifted. Berke gave Kaykaus an appanage in Crimea and had him married to his daughter, Urbay Khatun. He died an exile in 1279 or 1280 in Crimea.

== Identity and faith ==
According to researcher Rustam Shukurov, Kaykaus "had dual Christian and Muslim identity, an identity which was further complicated by dual Turkic/Persian and Greek ethnic identity". Kaykaus and his sons were all said to be baptised, and whilst in Constantinople, the family visited churches, received communion and attended Easter services under the watch of the Patriarch Arsenios. Even when in Crimea, Kaykaus still insisted on his Christian faith, defending the former Patriarch Arsenios against charges of non-canonical communication with pagans (Kaykaus and his family) by asking for the engolpion he had left in Constantinople and offering to eat pork to prove his orthodoxy.

== Family ==
In addition to his Mongol bride, Urbay Khatun, daughter of Berke Khan, Kaykaus had multiple wives, though only one accompanied him to Byzantium. The Armenian Kirakos Gandzaketsi reported that Kaykaus was married to a daughter of the emperor John III Doukas Vatatzes, and later Ottoman sources give her name as Anna, however both of these claims are unreliable and likely only indicate that his wife was Christian and possibly Roman (Byzantine). Christian Greek women were the dominant origin of the slave-concubines in the Seljuk harem. This wife continued to live in Constantinople following Kaykaus' escape.

Kakyaus' children, all with unknown mothers, were:

- Ghiyāth al-Dīn Masʿūd (b.1262-1308), the eldest son and heir who accompanied Kaykaus to Byzantium and then to the Golden Horde. Following Kaykaus' death, Masʿūd reclaimed his father's position, becoming the last Sultan of Rum, and maintained good relations with Michael VIII's son Andronikos II Palaiologos.
- Rukn al-Dīn Kayūmarth (b.1262- a.1293), the middle son who also followed his father to Byzantium and the Golden Horde. Involved in a power struggle with Masʿūd following Kaykaus' death that ended in Kayūmarth's imprisonment and death.
- Constantine Melik (b.1264- a.1306), who stayed in Constantinople after Kaykaus' escape, likely owing to his young age. Constantine remained in Roman service for the rest of his life and had an illustrious career as governor of Berroia in the 1280s and then of Pegai in 1305/1306. Constantine was at some point given the title of Caesar or Sebastokrator, and his descendants continued to serve in the Roman Empire till its collapse in the 15th century.
- Sabbas Soultan? (b.1265-1320?), another son who stayed behind in Constantinople. He appears to have become a monk and served under the Patriarch of Constantinople before moving to Crimea, where he died.
- Unnamed daughter (b.1264-?), who was arrested after her father's escape.
- Rukn al-Dīn Qılıc Arslan (a.1264-?), one of the sons of Kaykaus born in Crimea after the flight from Constantinople.
- Siyāwush (a.1264-?), one of the sons of Kaykaus born in Crimea after the flight from Constantinople.
- Farāmarz (a.1264-?), one of the sons of Kaykaus born in Crimea after the flight from Constantinple.

== Legacy ==
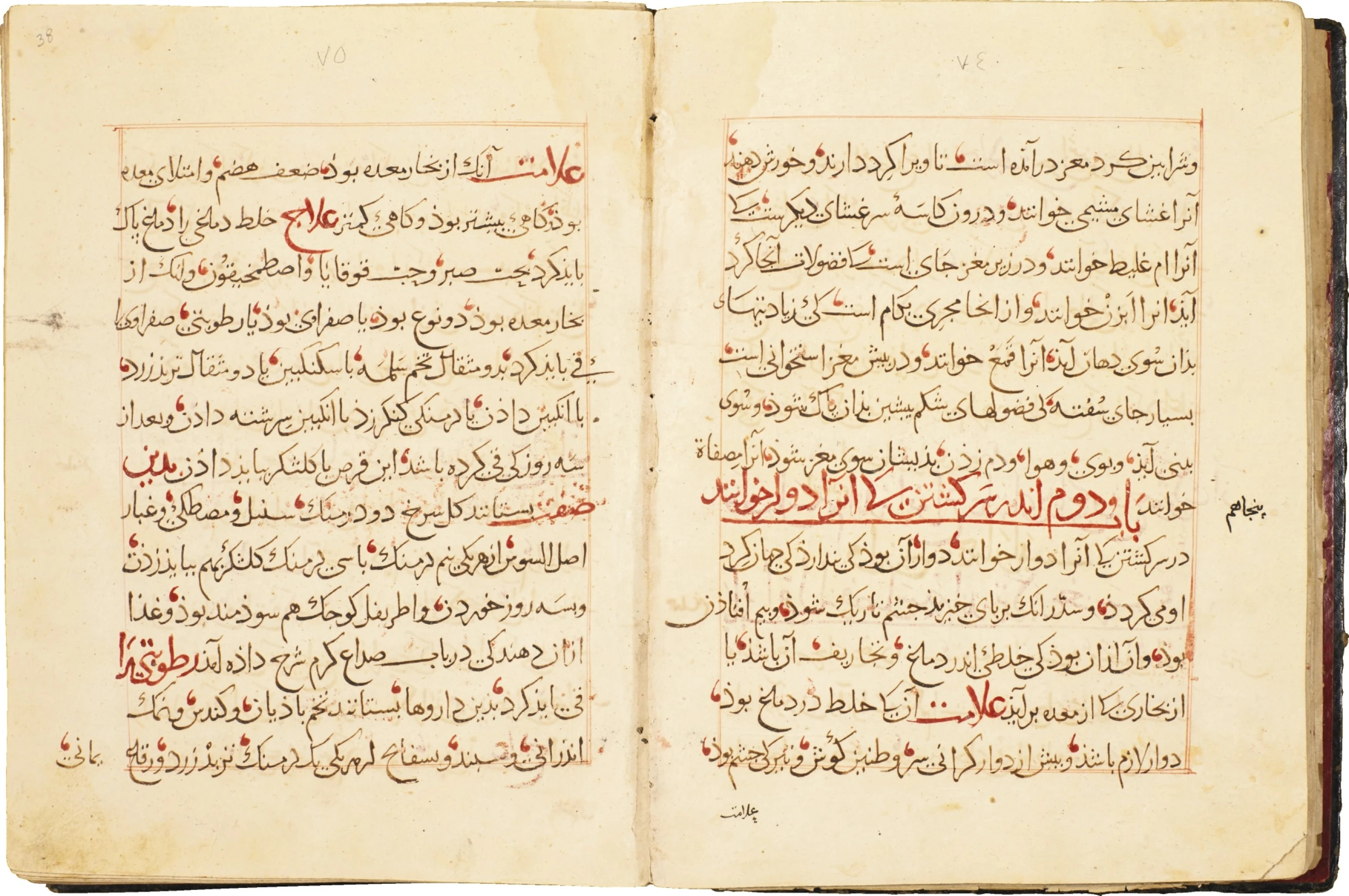
1251 Persian manuscript of Ali ibn Khalifa Salmasi's Durar-e makhzan-e kaykawusi ("The Pearls of the Treasury of Kay Kawus"), commissioned for the library of Sultan Kaykaus II. Created in Konya.

Though deposed and exiled, Kaykaus remained popular among the Turkmen of Anatolia and a threat to the stability of the fragile Seljuq-Mongol relationship. The vizier Fakhr al-Din Ali was imprisoned for a time in 1271 for corresponding with him. It was from Kaykaus that Karamanoğlu Mehmed Bey in 1276 sought help in his uprising against the Mongols. Since Kaykaus was in no position to help, Mehmed Bey thought it best to have a representative of Kaykaus’ line on his side, even if only an imposter, and named Jimri as head of the revolt. Kaykaus later dispatched several of his sons from the Crimea as pretenders, one of which, Masud II, was ultimately successful in winning the Seljuk throne in 1280.

Some modern historians consider the Byzantine noble Athanasios Soultanos to have been the brother or son of Kaykaus, but this is unlikely due to the later age Soultanos lived in. However another branch of the Christianized Seljuk royal family was begun by Kaykaus' son, and rose to prominence within Byzantine bureaucracy.

According to later Ottoman tradition, expressed by Yazıcızâde ‘Alī and Seyyid Lokman, most of the anti-Mongol Turkomans that accompanied Kaykaus to Constantinople, were later settled to Southern Dobruja by Michael VIII in 1263/64 during his war with Bulgaria, in order to reconquer the region for the Byzantine Empire, under the leadership of Kyr Khāya. This gave rise to the controversial claim that these Turkomans may have formed the basis of the modern day Gagauz people.

In the Ottoman period the rebel Sheikh Bedreddin, who drew support largely from Turkmen migrants to the Balkans, claimed descent from Kaykaus II.

== Bibliography ==
- Cahen, Claude (1968). Pre-Ottoman Turkey: a general survey of the material and spiritual culture and history. Translated by J. Jones-Williams. New York: Taplinger. pp. 271–279.
- de Nicola, Bruno (2017). Women in Mongol Iran: the Khātūns, 1206–1335. Edinburgh: Edinburgh University Press. ISBN 978-1-4744-1548-4.
- Peacock, A.C.S.; Yildiz, Sara Nur, eds. (2013). The Seljuks of Anatolia: Court and Society in the Medieval Middle East. I.B.Tauris. ISBN 978-0-85773-346-7.
- Shukurov, Rustam (2014). "Sultan 'Izz al-Dīn Kaykāwus II in Byzantium (1262-1264/1265)". Der Doppeladler. Byzanz und die Seldschuken in Anatolien vom späten 11. bis zum 13. Jahrhundert. Verlag des Römisch-Germanischen Zentralmuseums. ISBN 978-3-88467-235-8.
- Shukurov, Rustam (2016). The Byzantine Turks, 1204–1461. BRILL. ISBN 9789004307759.
- Vryonis, Speros (1971). The Decline of Medieval Hellenism in Asia Minor and the Process of Islamization from the Eleventh through the Fifteenth Century. University of California Press. ISBN 0-520-01597-5.

Preceded by Kaykhusraw II	Sultan of Rûm; 1246–1262	Succeeded by Kilij Arslan IV
