= Mongol invasion of Byzantine Thrace (1264–1265) =

1264/5 Golden Horde military campaign

- Part of the Mongol invasion of Europe
Date	Winter 1264/5
Location	Thrace, modern-day northeastern Greece and western Turkey
Result	Golden Horde victory

Belligerents
Golden Horde: Second Bulgarian Empire; Tatars	Byzantine Empire

Commanders and leaders
Nogai Khan: Constantine I Tih	Michael VIII Palaiologos

Strength
20,000	Unknown

The Mongol invasion of Byzantine Thrace took place in Thrace during the winter of 1264/5. The Sultan of Rum Kayqubad II appealed to Khan Berke and Nogai of the Golden Horde, to attack the Byzantine Empire in order to free his brother and former Sultan Kaykaus II.

== Background ==
The events are rather well-reported from various perspectives. Amongst the Egyptian sources are Baybars, Badr al-Din al-Ayni, al-Dhahabi, al-Nuwayri and al-Maqrizi; amongst the Persian sources are Ibn Bibi and al-Aqsarayi and the Turco-Persian Selçukname; amongst the Byzantine sources are George Akropolites, George Pachymeres and Nicephorus Gregoras.

Kaykaus had originally fled to Byzantium with his family and retinue around the summer of 1262, following his defeat by his brother Kilij Arslan IV, and was welcomed by Emperor Michael VIII Palaiologos and his court, and had even converted to Christianity. However their relationship soon deteriorated during the Arsenite Schism, as Kaykaus was a supporter of Arsenius. According to Ibn Bibi and al-Aqsarayi, Kaykaus plotted to overthrow Michael, but his plans were revealed by his maternal uncle, Kyr Kedid. After the plot was uncovered, Michael had his equerry blinded, his general executed, and his family was moved to Berroia, while Kaykaus was imprisoned in Ainos.

The former sultan then turned to the Golden Horde. According to al-Aqsarayi, one of his paternal aunts was a wife of Berke. According to Pachymeres, he had an uncle of high rank in the Horde. Whatever his connection, he made contact with the Horde, who enlisted the support of their vassal, Bulgaria.

Nicephorus Gregoras is unique in claiming that Kaykaus first made contact with the Bulgarian ruler, Tsar Constantine I Tih, who enlisted his Mongol overlords. He admits however, that the Mongol element was predominant in the invading army. He writes that they came from Paristrion, north of the lower Danube. He gives their number as 20,000 (or two tumens). According to Pachymeres, they were an autonomous band, de facto independent of the authority of the Golden Horde, and were instead Bulgarian-allied Tatar mercenaries.

== Invasion ==
The Haemus and Anatolia in 1265

The Mongols, Bulgarians and Tatars launched a joint invasion of Byzantine Thrace and crossed the frozen Danube river in the winter of 1264/5. They chased away the armies of Michael in 1265 and begun plundering the countryside. During the siege of Ainos by the Bulgarian-Tatar forces, an agreement was reached, in which Kaykaus would be given to them and the siege would be lifted.

== Aftermath ==
In 1266, Michael allied with Nogai by giving him his illegitimate daughter, Euphrosyne Palaiologina, as a wife. Berke ceded Crimea to Kaykaus as an appanage and had him married to his daughter, Urbay Khatun.

Berke's invasion of Thrace may have been the war which delayed Niccolò and Maffeo Polo's journey in the 1260s.

== See also ==
- Byzantine–Mongol alliance
- Mongol invasion of the Latin Empire

== Sources ==
- Grousset, René (1970). Empire of the Steppes: A History of Central Asia. Rutgers University Press. ISBN 0813506271.
- Jackson, Peter (2014) [2005]. The Mongols and the West, 1221-1410. London and New York: Routledge. ISBN 9781317878995.
- de Nicola, Bruno (2017). Women in Mongol Iran: the Khātūns, 1206–1335. Edinburgh: Edinburgh University Press. ISBN 9781474415484.
- Nicol, Donald M. (1993), The Last Centuries of Byzantium, 1261-1453, Cambridge University Press, ISBN 9780521439916
- Vásáry, István (2005). Cumans and Tatars: Oriental Military in the Pre-Ottoman Balkans, 1185–1365. Cambridge: Cambridge University Press. ISBN 9781139444088.
- Saunders, John Joseph (1971). The history of the Mongol conquests. Routledge & Kegan Paul. ISBN 071007073X.
- Shukurov, Rustam (2016). The Byzantine Turks, 1204–1461. BRILL. ISBN 9789004307759.
