= Baiju Noyan =

Mongol commander and imperial governor

- ᠪᠠᠶᠢᠵᠤ ᠨᠣᠶᠠᠨ
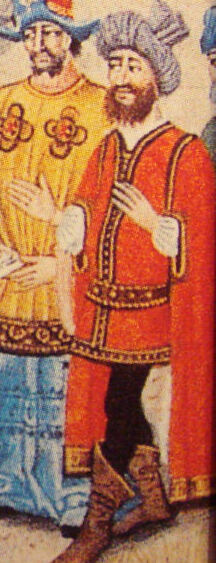
- A French depiction of Baiju in 1462 by David Aubert in the Chronique des Empereurs

Viceroy of Mongol Empire in Near East
- Preceded by: Chormaqan
- Succeeded by: Eljigidei
- Appointed by: Ögedei Khan

Personal details
- Born: c. 1201
- Died: c. 1258
- Spouse: Ruzuqan
- Nickname: Baichu

Military service
- Battles/wars: The Battle of Köse Dağ; The Battle of Aksaray; The Siege and Fall of Baghdad

Baiju Noyan or Baichu (Mongolian: ᠪᠠᠶᠢᠵᠤ ᠨᠣᠶᠠᠨ; Chagatai: بایجو نویان; Chinese: 拜住; pinyin: Bàizhù; in European sources: Bayothnoy; fl. died c. 1258) was a Mongol commander in Persia, Armenia, Anatolia and Georgia. He was appointed by Ögedei Khan to succeed Chormagan. He was the last direct imperial governor of the Mongol Near East; after his death Hulagu's descendants inherited domains he once commanded.

== Background ==
Baiju belonged to Besut tribe of Mongols and was a relative of Jebe. His father was a mingghan commander under Genghis Khan and he inherited this contingent upon his death.

== Career ==
Baiju was a second-in-command of Chormaqan and took part in an attack on Jalal ad-Din near Isfahan in 1228. After Chormaqan's paralysis in 1241, Baiju took over his troops and became a tümen commander by appointment of Ögedei Khan. After Ögedei's death, Baiju started to take orders from Batu, former's nephew. Baiju immediately moved against the Seljuk Sultanate of Rûm, weakening its power at the Battle of Köse Dağ on 26 June 1243. After this battle, the Sultanate became a vassal state of the Mongol Empire and was forced to release David VII Ulu. Baiju demanded the submission of Principality of Antioch too in 1244. He made a raid on Abbasid Caliphate in 1245. He also led Mongol tumens to raid Syria in 1246.

He received ambassadors from Pope Innocent IV in 1247. Embassy was headed by Ascelin of Lombardy and found him at Sisian, on 24 May 1247. Embassy's disrespect and Ascelin's refusal to triple genuflection angered Baiju, he insulted the pope and demanded his submission as well. Ascelin left for Rome on 24 July 1247. Meanwhile he was replaced by new khagan Güyük with Eljigidei. His next two attempts to invade the Abbasid Caliphate in Iraq met less success in 1249–50. He again rose to prominence as Eljigidei and his entire family were purged by Batu for his opposition to election of Möngke Khan in 1251.

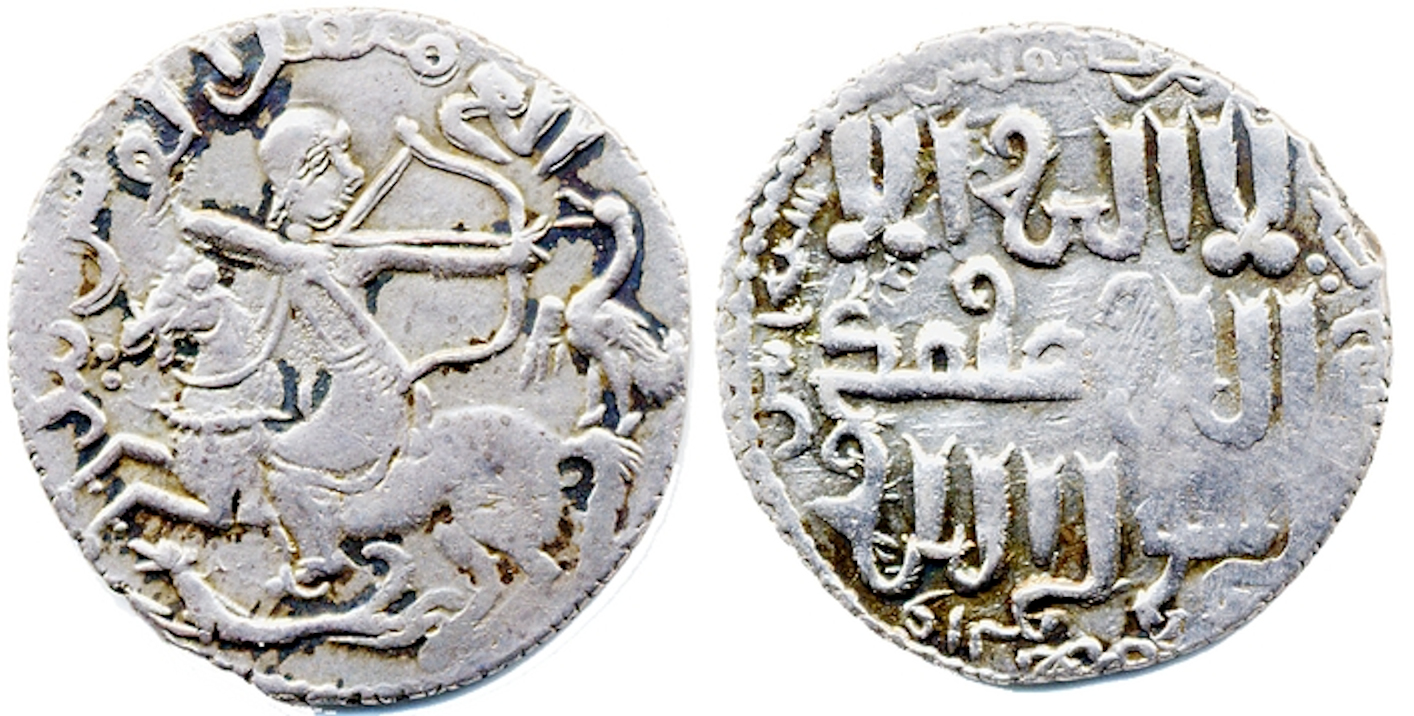
Georgian coinage of Baiju Noyan in the time of Turakina, Tiflis, 642 H (1244–1245).Obv: "The Great Mongol Viceroy (Commander-in-Chief)". Rev: "No god but Allah/ Muhammad Is the Messenger of Allah" in the margin "Tiflis 642".

Under Baiju in the 1240s and 1250s, the Mongols retained their power in what is roughly modern-day Iran, and tolerated the independence of the Seljuk Sultanate of Rûm, Georgia, and petty states in Iran as clients, interfering with dynastic succession and extracting tribute militarily as necessary. However, the Abbasids in Baghdad and the Assassins in the Elbruz mountains maintained their independence until the coming of Hülegü, Möngke's brother, in 1255. Baiju was supposedly reproached by Hulegu for failing to extend Mongol power further, and, indeed, was replaced by him as supreme commander as early as 1255, but served under him ably in further campaigns: to victory against the Sultanate of Rum (to extract tribute and replace the sultan Kaykavus II) in 1256, in the assault on Baghdad in 1258, and in the advance on Syria towards Egypt in September 1259.

It is unclear what happened to Baiju after that: when the Mongol force was heavily depleted by the departure of Hülegü in 1260, the force that remained was commanded by Kitbuqa. According to various sources Baiju was executed by Hülegü after the capture of Baghdad due to his hesitation to join Hulagu during the campaign and his secret correspondence with Caliph Al-Musta'sim.

== Portrayal in media ==
- 2015–2016 — Portrayed by Barış Bağcı in Turkish historical drama series Diriliş: Ertuğrul where he was referred to as Noyan, although Noyan was traditionally implemented as a Mongol military title.
