= Crusading for the Latin Empire =

From its foundation in 1204 in the wake of the Fourth Crusade, the papacy extended consistent support to the Latin Empire of Constantinople—established by Western crusaders on former Byzantine territory—by conferring crusade indulgences upon those who undertook its defence.

== Towards papal legitimisation ==
=== Aftermath of the Fourth Crusade ===
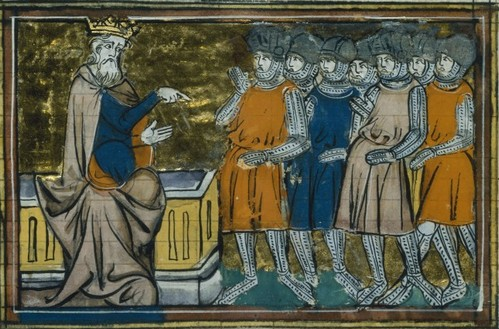
Baldwin I, Latin Emperor and his knights (from a 14th-century manuscript of William of Tyre's chronicle)

Baldwin I informed Innocent III of his election in a letter that also outlined the circumstances leading to it. He emphasised the alleged disobedience of the Byzantine Church to papal authority. He also accused the Byzantines of duplicity, hostility, and obstructing expeditions to the Holy Land, thereby seeking to justify the crusaders' attack on Constantinople, despite Innocent's earlier rejection of similar arguments. Baldwin further requested that crusading indulgences be granted to those, "both nobles and commoners", who came to defend the Latin Empire, while maintaining that fulfilment of his vow to reach the Holy Land remained his ultimate objective. Without awaiting the Pope's reply, Baldwin appealed directly to other western leaders, including Archbishop Adolph of Cologne, thereby, as Chrissis observes, he effectively "hijacked the crusade".

In his reply to Baldwin's letter of November 1204, Innocent authorised participants of the Fourth Crusade to remain and defend the Latin Empire rather than proceed immediately to the Holy Land. Emphasising that their presence in Constantinople was essential for the defence of the Holy Land, he granted them crusade indulgences. In April or May 1205, he further instructed them to remain there for one year, although without releasing them from their ultimate obligation to campaign in the Holy Land thereafter. Later in May, he extended crusading indulgences to new recruits, arguing that Baldwin's position first had to be secured if the expedition to the Holy Land was to continue. In Chrissis's view, these measures "constitute an important turning point", as Innocent sanctioned "the use of crusading mechanisms" for the defence of the Latin Empire, justifying this policy by reference to the protection of the Holy Land and the union of the churches.

=== Crusade of Bishop Nivelon of Soissons ===
Kaloyan of Bulgaria entered into negotiations with Pope Innocent III on the eve of the Fourth Crusade. In exchange for recognising papal supremacy over the Bulgarian Orthodox Church, Innocent offered him a royal crown. Seeking to strengthen his international position, Kaloyan accepted, but requested the title of tsar for himself and that of patriarch for the head of the Bulgarian Church. Innocent dispatched a papal legate to Bulgaria, who crowned Kaloyan king on 7 November 1204 and granted the Bulgarian prelate the title of primate, thus only partially fulfilling Kaloyan's request. Kaloyan did not renounce his claims and continued to style himself tsar.

In the aftermath of the sack of Constantinople, Kaloyan began to assert control over Thrace, seizing territories from local Greek árchontes (aristocrats). Although he was prepared to reach a compromise with the Latins regarding the division of the region, they sought to assume possession of all former Byzantine lands. They also refused to confirm the Thracian árchontes in their holdings, intending instead to distribute the hinterland of Constantinople among themselves. In response, the Greeks rose in open rebellion and sought Kaloyan's protection. After the Greeks of Adrianople expelled the Latin garrison and submitted to him, Baldwin I advanced against the city without waiting for reinforcements. His forces were defeated at the city on 14 April 1205 by Kaloyan and his Cuman allies. Captured on the battlefield, Baldwin was taken prisoner, and Kaloyan informed the pope of his death in July 1206. Baldwin was succeeded by his brother Henry, who was crowned emperor on 20 August.

Meanwhile, the two papal legates in the East, Cardinals Peter Capuano and Soffred, left the Crusader states for Constantinople, where they released the crusaders from their obligation to proceed to the Holy Land. In July 1205 Pope Innocent sharply rebuked this decision, having recently learned of the atrocities committed during the sack of Constantinople. That same month Henry, acting as regent for his captive brother, wrote to the Pope urging him to proclaim a crusade across Catholic Europe. He pointed to Kaloyan's expansionism and the Greek rising in Thrace, attributing recent disasters to the sins of the Latins. The letter was carried by Nivelon de Quierzy, Bishop of Soissons, together with the knights Nicholas of Mailly and John Bliaud. In response, Innocent issued an encyclical granting crusade indulgences to those who took up arms in defence of the Latin Empire, maintaining that Latin control of Constantinople offered "hope, for sure, that Jerusalem will be liberated from the pagans". Acting as regent for the underage Frederick of Sicily, he also granted the crusaders safe passage to Apulia and arranged their transport from Brindisi, instructing them to notify him of their expected arrival.

Bishop Nivelon circulated letters combining extracts from Henry's appeal and the papal encyclical granting indulgences. At the same time, Innocent informed Kaloyan of the projected crusade, urging him to release Baldwin and reach an accommodation with the Latins. From Rome, Nivelon travelled to north-eastern France and Flanders to preach the crusade, carrying relics with him. Henry's brother, Philip I of Namur, appears to have been designated its leader, as Innocent urged him in April 1206 to set out for Constantinople. In the same letter the Pope released participants from all other pilgrimage vows, except those relating to the Holy Land. According to Chrissis, this marks the first documented instance of vow commutation. Philip, however, withdrew from the enterprise and declined to contribute financially. Despite this setback, the contemporaneous Annales Reineri records that "an innumerable multitude of clergy, monks, and laymen, were inflamed with the zeal of faith" and took the cross.

The conclusion of the crusade remains uncertain. Bishop Nivelon died at Bari in September 1207. The medievalist Walter Norden and the Byzantinist Ernst Gerland state that the crusading forces "dispersed" following his death; however, as Chrissis observes, they provide no conclusive evidence in support of this claim. By contrast, an early redaction of the chronicle of Niketas Choniates, composed in the early 1210s, records the crusaders' arrival at Dyrrachion and their defeat by Michael I Komnenos Doukas, the Greek ruler of Epirus, during their eastward advance. Nicholas of Mailly and John Bliaud returned to the Latin Empire, where they campaigned against the Bulgarians in 1207–08. Around the turn of 1207 and 1208, a further contingent of crusaders, dispatched by Philip of Namur, reached Constantinople under the command of Peter of Douai. They subsequently served in the army of Henry, engaging both Boril of Bulgaria, successor to Kaloyan, and the rebellious Lombard lords in the Kingdom of Thessalonica.

=== Crusading rhetoric ===
Following the Battle of Adrianople, Kaloyan captured Serres and Philippopolis. The imprisonment and execution of numerous inhabitants drove the Greek population to seek rapprochement with the Latins, enabling Emperor Henry and King Boniface of Thessalonica to preserve Latin authority in Thrace and Macedonia. After Boniface was killed in a skirmish with Bulgarian raiders on 4 September 1207, he was succeeded by his underage son, Demetrius, under the regency of his mother, Margaret of Hungary. The local Lombard aristocracy, however, opposed her rule and elected one of their own, Hubert of Biandrate, as guardian to the child king. Kaloyan was unable to capitalise on the situation, as he died under uncertain circumstances before the walls of Thessaloniki in October. His eleven-year-old son, Ivan Asen, was compelled to seek exile, and the throne passed to Kaloyan's nephew, Boril, who proved unable to assert effective authority over the recalcitrant frontier magnates.

Emperor Henry summoned Hubert to Constantinople in order to exact his oath of fealty, but the latter refused, prompting Henry to march on Thessaloniki. Despite the resistance of the Lombard lords, Henry secured Thessaloniki with the support of Margaret and her adherents and crowned Demetrius king in January 1209. Hubert and his supporters fled to Boeotia, but Henry pursued them and compelled their submission by early summer. The Latin defeat at Adrianople enabled Theodore Laskaris to consolidate and extend his authority in western Anatolia. In 1208 he convened a synod at his capital, which elected Michael Autoreianos as ecumenical patriarch. On Easter Sunday, Michael crowned Theodore emperor, thereby affirming his claim to be the lawful successor of the Byzantine emperors. The growing prominence of crusading concepts in the Greek world was reflected, circa 1208–10, in Patriarch Michael's grant of indulgences to those who took up arms against the Latins.

To secure support in the West, the Latins of Constantinople frequently employed crusading imagery and rhetoric, presenting themselves as champions of the Church and their opponents as its foes. From the outset, the Latin emperors regularly dispatched relics to western rulers to foster enthusiasm for crusading efforts in defence of their empire. Henry, in particular, was active in cultivating western backing. His campaigns were at times framed by crusading rituals: soldiers made confession and received communion, while attending prelates promised plenary indulgences. During his campaign against Boril, for example, the chaplain Philip accompanied the army bearing a relic of the True Cross. Philip carried the same relic to the Battle of Philippopolis, where he granted absolution to the warriors, who subsequently advanced with the crusading cry, "Holy Sepulchre!". Henry's triumphalist proclamations concerning his victories over his Greek and Bulgarian adversaries habitually invoked divine favour and concluded with appeals for reinforcements from the West, pointedly reminding his correspondents of the small number of troops at his disposal. The Latins maintained that the foundation of their empire was an expression of divine providence and that its defence therefore constituted a service to God. This interpretation was swiftly taken up by western intellectuals, leading the Cistercian abbot Arnaud Amaury to describe a tripartite crusading movement in which the "schismatics of the East" were numbered among the enemies. From the early 1210s, Pope Innocent's efforts to recruit troops for the Latin Empire declined as his focus shifted to a crusade for the recovery of the Holy Land. He nevertheless supported Henry by forbidding Catholics, on pain of excommunication, to enter the service of the rulers of Epirus and Nicaea. In April 1213 he proclaimed the Fifth Crusade, yet the bull Quia maior was not circulated in the Latin Empire, suggesting he did not expect its forces to take part.

Henry's victory over Boril at Philippopolis consolidated his authority over the city and secured the submission of Boril's cousin, Alexius Slav, who held the Rhodope Mountains. In 1209, Michael of Epirus likewise acknowledged Henry's supremacy, yet soon defected, joining Boril and his kinsman Strez in an assault upon Thessaloniki. Henry repelled the attack and appropriated territories from both Michael and Strez, compelling Michael to sue for peace in 1211. In that same year, Nicaean forces advanced upon Constantinople; Henry, however, induced the Seljuks of Rum to invade Nicaea from the east, obliging the Nicaeans to withdraw. In the autumn of 1211 he decisively defeated Theodore Lascaris at the Battle of the Rhyndacus and commenced the conquest of north-western Anatolia, though the shortage of troops to garrison the fortresses curtailed further expansion. A peace was subsequently concluded with Theodore. In 1213 or 1214 negotiations were opened concerning ecclesiastical union between the papal legate Pelagius of Albano and Nicholas Mesarites, the Orthodox metropolitan of Ephesus in Nicaea, but without result. By this time, Greek hostility towards the Latins had been intensified by polemical works, including the anonymous pamphlet Latin Atrocities in Constantinople after the Capture and a theological treatise by Constantine Stilbes on Catholic doctrine which also addressed the question of crusading indulgences.

== Consolidation ==
=== Crusade for Emperor Peter's liberation ===
On 11 June 1216 Emperor Henry died without direct heir. On 16 July Pope Innocent III also died and, two days later, Honorius III was elected to succeed him. Like his predecessor, Honorius showed little inclination to rise fresh crusader troops in defence of the Latin Empire, though he was not hostile towards the Latins. The Latin barons elected Henry's brother-in-law, Peter of Courtenay, husband of his sister Yolanda, as emperor. A wealthy French nobleman, Peter set out for his new dominion with 160 knights and some 5,500 additional troops. On 9 April 1217 he was crowned in Rome by Honorius, outside the Aurelian Walls, so as not to prejudice Frederick of Sicily's claim to the Holy Roman Empire, which the papacy supported. Sailing from Brindisi on Venetian vessels, Peter landed at Dyrrachium, recently taken by the Epirotes from Venice. After besieging the city, he advanced towards Constantinople, but was intercepted and captured, together with the papal legate Cardinal Giovanni Colonna, by Epirote forces. Epirus was then ruled by Theodore Komnenos Doukas, who had succeeded his half-brother Michael, murdered by a servant less than two years earlier. He had Peter imprisoned in an Epirote dungeon.

Pope Honorius urged Theodore to release Emperor Peter and Cardinal Giovanni, threatening invasion by Catholic powers. He also appealed to Andrew II of Hungary, Peter's son-in-law and a former candidate for the Latin throne, who was then preparing for a crusade to the Holy Land, encouraging him to intimidate Theodore with the prospect of a crusading attack. On 4 November 1217 Honorius instructed the French prelates to preach a crusade for Peter's liberation. Seeking to secure support, he portrayed Peter's captivity as an affront to French honour and stressed the grave danger facing the Latin Empire. Honorius also urged Robert of Courtenay, Peter's brother, to join the expedition, commuting his vow to travel to the Holy Land and thereby presenting the defence of the Latin Empire as a crusading objective in its own right.

Peter died in captivity, but, at papal insistence, Theodore set Cardinal Giovanni at liberty. Honorius, in gratitude, soon placed him and Epirus under papal protection and forbade crusaders and Venetians to attack it, indicating that the Fifth Crusade had been his principal concern all along. When Pelagius, then Honorius's legate to the crusaders, who were in a critical situation at Damietta in Egypt, criticised him for diverting crusading energies towards the Latin Empire and Occitania, Honorius replied that he had explicitly forbidden those who had already taken the cross to alter their objective.

=== Montferrat Crusade ===
Theodore of Epirus pursued an expansionist policy, capturing key fortified towns, including Neopatras and Zeitounion, from the Latins. By 1221 he had also taken Serres, thereby securing much of Macedonia and Thessaly and leaving Thessaloniki, as the historian John V. A. Fine observes, "an island in the midst of Theodore's possessions". Meanwhile, the Latin Empire was governed first by Empress Yolanda and, after her death in September 1219, by a regency council dominated by Cardinal Giovanni Colonna. Authority passed to Robert of Courtenay, the son of Yolanda and Peter of Courtenay, upon his arrival from the West in March 1221.

After the loss of Serres, the young Demetrius of Thessalonica travelled to Italy with Archbishop Warin to seek military assistance against Epirus. Having met Pope Honorius III, Demetrius and his elder half-brother, William VI of Montferrat, also visited the Holy Roman Emperor Frederick II. Meanwhile, the failure of the Fifth Crusade in Egypt enabled the Pope to redirect crusading enthusiasm towards the Latin Empire. He appointed Hubert of Biandrate, Demetrius's former guardian, to recruit troops with crusade indulgences and urged Emperor Robert to cooperate with him. Justifying the enterprise as a defence of the empire, Honorius referred to the Greeks—apparently for the first time in papal documents—as "enemies of the Faith".

In early 1223 Demetrius's mother, Margaret, fled Thessaloniki for Hungary, and Guy Pallavicini, marquis of Bodonitsa, assumed responsibility for the city's defence. Theodore soon laid siege to Thessaloniki, prompting Honorius to proclaim a full crusade for its relief in May 1223. He permitted those already pledged to the Holy Land to join the enterprise without release from their original vow and granted full indulgence to those who died during the campaign. Early in 1224 William VI and his forces were placed under papal protection, while prelates in Italy and Burgundy were instructed to preach the crusade and offer plenary indulgence to new recruits. The expedition was financed partly from papal funds—15,000 silver marks drawn from the twentieth levied on clerical income for the defence of the Holy Land—and partly through the mortgaging of Montferrat to Emperor Frederick. William's illness, however, delayed his departure, necessitating further expenses met by a special tax on clerical income in the Latin Empire.

Meanwhile, Emperor Robert dispatched Thierry of Walincourt to attack Serres, but Theodore of Epirus defeated his forces. Robert also intervened in the succession crisis following the death of Theodore Laskaris in Nicaea, yet Laskaris's son-in-law and successor, John III Vatatzes, defeated the Latins and their allies at the Battle of Poimanenon. Pope Honorius urged the Latin lords of Greece, notably Geoffrey I of Villehardouin, prince of Achaea, and Othon de la Roche, lord of Athens, to assist their fellow Latins in Thessaloniki; yet, with most of Thessaly under Epirote control, they were unable to reach the city. After nearly twenty months of resistance, Thessaloniki surrendered to Theodore of Epirus in December 1224. William VI and his army set out only in the following spring. Although the size of the force is unknown, Lombard, Tuscan, and Burgundian knights took part, and a remark by the Orthodox metropolitan of Naupaktos, John Apokaukos, describing ships filling the sea and horses covering the plain, suggests a substantial host. The crusaders landed at Halmyros in Thessaly but failed to advance on the city, as all routes to the mainland were controlled by Epirote forces. By September William and much of the army had died of dysentery, bringing the expedition to complete failure. Demetrius died in exile in Italy in 1230, having transferred his claim to the Kingdom of Thessalonica to Emperor Frederick II. The use of crusading against the Greeks soon provoked criticism in the West, reflected in a poem by the Occitan troubadour Guilhem Figueira, who denounced the papacy as "false and perfidious", harming both Occitans and Greeks while doing "little harm to the Saracens".

After the conquest of Thessaloniki, formerly the Byzantine Empire's second city, Theodore of Epirus became convinced that his claim to the imperial inheritance was as strong as that of his Nicaean rival. He therefore resolved to assume the imperial title, but Constantine Mesopotamites, the Orthodox metropolitan of Thessaloniki whom he had restored to office, refused to crown him. Mesopotamites was exiled, and a synod of Epirote bishops sanctioned Theodore's assumption of the title. He was crowned emperor by Archbishop Demetrius of Ohrid c. 1225, but Patriarch Germanos II of Constantinople, then resident in Nicaea, soon denied Demetrius's right to perform the coronation.

== Zenith ==
=== Crusading for a new emperor ===
Pope Honorius III died on 18 March 1227. His successor, Gregory IX, oversaw the organisation of crusading campaigns against a range of adversaries across multiple theatres of war, including the Cathars in Occitania and his political opponents in Germany and Italy. After the loss of Thessaloniki, the Latins were able to retain Constantinople only because their principal rivals—Epirus, Bulgaria, and Nicaea—"could not allow anyone of themselves to take the city", as the historian Kenneth M. Setton observes. The Latins subsequently relinquished their remaining Anatolian territories in exchange for an anti-Epirote alliance with Nicaea. Emperor Robert, unpopular owing to his idleness and debauchery, was expelled by his subjects and died in exile in Achaea in early 1228. He was succeeded by his eleven-year-old brother, Baldwin II, with the aristocrat Narjot de Toucy serving as regent.

Ivan Asen II of Bulgaria proposed a marriage alliance between his daughter Helen and the child emperor, under which he would assume the regency for Baldwin and protect the Latin Empire against Theodore of Epirus. Fearing a Bulgarian occupation of Constantinople, the Latin leaders declined the offer but continued negotiations with him, while also sending envoys to Rome to seek papal counsel. With the approval of the new pope, Gregory IX, the Latin throne was subsequently offered to John of Brienne, the former king of Jerusalem, who accepted it in April 1229.

John, who ruled Jerusalem first by right of his wife, Maria, and subsequently as regent for their daughter Isabella II, had been displaced by the Holy Roman Emperor Frederick II shortly after Frederick's marriage to Isabella in 1225. After Gregory IX excommunicated Frederick for allegedly failing to fulfil his crusading vow to the Holy Land, John led papal forces against the Kingdom of Sicily in early 1229, but the attack was repelled by Frederick. By this time, the Treaty of Jaffa concluded between Frederick and al-Kamil, sultan of Egypt, had restored Christian rule in the city of Jerusalem and established a ten-year truce, temporarily removing the Holy Land as a target for crusading.

In December 1229, Pope Gregory granted crusade indulgences to all who would accompany John to Constantinople and serve there for one year. In his encyclical, Gregory argued that the participants would engage in a godly cause "for the affair of the Holy Land and the interest of the entire Church", since support for the Latin Empire would bring assistance to the Holy Land "as through a shortcut". In early 1230, Theodore of Epirus resolved to launch an assault on Constantinople, but for unknown reasons altered his plans during the campaign and instead invaded Bulgaria. In April, his army was defeated by John Asen at the Battle of Klokotnitsa. Theodore was captured, blinded, and imprisoned, after which the victorious John Asen seized much of Macedonia and Thrace. Manuel Doukas, Theodore's brother and successor in Thessaly, became a vassal of John Asen.

John of Brienne raised an army of 500 knights and 5,000 soldiers and in August 1231 concluded a treaty with the Venetian doge Jacopo Tiepolo for the transport of his forces to "Constantinople, the land of Vatatzes or wherever else" within the Latin Empire. Pope Gregory also urged Hungarian aristocrats and prelates who had taken the cross for the Holy Land either to join John's expedition or to redeem their vows through a monetary contribution to his enterprise. The papal envoys' mission in Hungary, however, proved unsuccessful, and the pope consequently ordered Bishop Gregory of Győr to secure the departure of 300 Hungarian crusaders for the rescue of the Latin Empire, even if they had pledged to fight for the Holy Land, under pain of ecclesiastical censure. John encountered deeply adverse circumstances in Constantinople. Although Geoffrey II of Villehardouin, Prince of Achaea, offered to provide 20,000 hyperpyra annually for the defence of the imperial capital, John was unable to pay his troops, and the crusading force gradually disbanded.

=== Negotiations for church union ===
After John of Brienne assumed authority in Constantinople, Ivan Asen II of Bulgaria entered into negotiations with the Nicaean emperor, John III Vatatzes. In 1232, Ivan Asen renounced the union of the Bulgarian Church with the papacy and recognised the jurisdiction of Patriarch Germanos II of Constantinople over the ecclesiastical hierarchy of the Empire of Thessalonica.

Preoccupied with conflicts against the Seljuks of Rum in Anatolia, the Venetians in Crete, and the Greek ruler of Rhodes, Leo Gabalas, John Vatatzes pursued a tactical accommodation with the Latins. At his initiative, Patriarch Germanos proposed negotiations with the papacy on church union in the summer of 1232. In his reply—described by Chrissis as "somewhat arrogant"—Pope Gregory IX welcomed the proposal, attributing the fall of the Byzantine Empire to the schism. In Chrissis's view, the negotiations indicate that "the papacy was seriously considering an alternative to supporting the Latin Empire through the crusade as a means of furthering papal influence". The talks were initially conducted through correspondence and later by envoys. The Nicaeans emphasised the atrocities committed by the Latins during the sack of Constantinople, while the papal representatives accused the Greeks of heresy; consequently, the negotiations collapsed in May 1234. Immediately after the talks broke down, Gregory again appealed to the Hungarian prelates, instructing them to press those crusaders who had not honoured their vows concerning Constantinople to fulfil them without delay, warning of interdict or excommunication should they refuse. The Hungarians nevertheless remained unwilling to fight for the Latin Empire, prompting Gregory of Győr to place them under interdict.

=== Baldwin II's Crusade ===
Pope Gregory IX proclaimed a new crusade for the Holy Land in the autumn of 1234, appointing July 1239—the expiry of the ten-year truce concluded in 1229—as the date of departure. The crusade was subsequently preached in England and France by Dominican and Franciscan friars, attracting several prominent aristocrats, including Theobald IV of Champagne, Peter of Dreux, and Richard of Cornwall.

By the collapse of negotiations for church union between Nicaea and the papacy, Emperor John Vatatzes had concluded his war against the Seljuks, forced Leo Gabalas into submission, and renewed hostilities with the Latins. In spring 1235 he allied with Bulgaria, sealed by the marriage of Helena of Bulgaria to Vatatzes's son Theodore. Nicaean forces subsequently occupied eastern Thrace and, with Bulgarian support, besieged Constantinople, which John of Brienne defended with Venetian and Achaean assistance. Alarmed by the threat to the city, Gregory issued the bull Ut Israelem veteris, urging crusaders in France and Hungary who had taken vows for the Holy Land to redirect their efforts to the defence of Constantinople. In a letter to Béla IV of Hungary, he stressed that campaigning against the schismatic Bulgarians and Nicaeans would serve both Constantinople and the Holy Land and merit a double reward. The pope further warned that, should Constantinople fall to the Greeks, "who hate the Latins more than the pagans do", the loss of the Holy Land would follow. A similar appeal was addressed to Béla's brother Coloman, duke of Slavonia, then engaged in a crusade against Bosnian heretics.

Pope Gregory instructed his agent, William of Cordelle, to commute the crusading vows of 400 knights to encourage their participation in Constantinople's defence, while special envoys preached the crusade in France and Hungary. These efforts met limited enthusiasm, prompting the pope to issue a new crusade bull for Constantinople in January 1236. Peter of Dreux appears to have pledged to undertake the expedition, as a letter of 23 October 1236 suggests that Gregory appointed him its leader. The pope also absolved Peter's chancellor, Bishop Ranulf of Quimper, of his vow to the Holy Land so that he might administer Peter's lands during his absence while retaining crusading indulgence. Gregory raised funds through established crusade revenues, including taxes on clerical income and indulgences granted in exchange for monetary payments.

As Constantinople stood on the brink of conquest, the Latins sent the young Emperor Baldwin II to the West to seek assistance. The city was saved by a rift between Nicaea and Bulgaria, as Ivan Asen recognised that its fall would chiefly benefit Nicaea. He withdrew from the siege, declared war on Nicaea, and allied with the Latins, jointly attacking the fortress of Tzurulum, recently taken by the Nicaeans. When a pandemic claimed the lives of his wife, son, and the Bulgarian patriarch, however, Ivan Asen—interpreting this as divine retribution—broke with the Latins and renewed his alliance with Nicaea in 1237. The departure of the French crusaders for Constantinople was repeatedly postponed. On 8 December 1236 Pope Gregory issued a new crusade bull, Ad subveniendum imperio, for France and Hungary, renewing emphasis on the Greeks' heresy. The bull stipulated that collected funds were to be spent according to Emperor Baldwin's counsel. As preparations for crusades to the Holy Land and Constantinople proceeded in parallel, Gregory ordered revenues from the commutation of crusading vows in the Latin Empire and the dioceses of dioceses of Cambrai, Tournai, and Arras to be directed to the campaign supporting the Latin Empire. He also wrote to John Vatatzes threatening the forthcoming crusade; the Nicaean emperor replied sarcastically, dismissing it as "an affront to the Holy Land and games at the expense of the Cross".

In late 1237 Gregory intensified efforts to finance the expedition, assigning crusade revenues from Brittany, Poitou, and Anjou, though departure was again delayed until August 1238. Learning of Ivan Asen's renewed alliance with Vatatzes, Gregory called for a crusade against the Bulgarians to be preached in Hungary, granting Béla IV rights over Bulgaria, described as "infected with heretical wickedness", yet Béla undertook no campaign. In France, no earlier crusade for the Latin Empire had been proclaimed so widely: the archbishops of Vienne, Lyon, Besançon, and Bourges, together with the bishops of Cambrai, Toul, Metz, Liège, and Verdun, were instructed to preach it, while the Dominicans were authorised to do so throughout the kingdom. Gregory also appealed to individual nobles, including Humbert V of Beaujeu and John II of Soissons, promising financial aid to the former and threatening the latter with excommunication.

Papal appeals for support of the crusade provoked opposition, particularly among the clergy. In November 1238 Pope Gregory appealed to Louis IX of France and Henry III of England to persuade their prelates to grant a thirtieth of ecclesiastical revenues for three years. By this time Peter of Dreux had resolved to depart on crusade to the Holy Land rather than aid the Latin Empire, a decision followed by other aristocrats, including John of Soissons. Despite these setbacks, Gregory set March 1239 as a new departure date and appointed Baldwin II leader of the expedition. According to the Annals of Erfurt, about 2,000 French crusaders joined it. To raise further funds, Baldwin sold the Crown of Thorns to Louis IX and pawned the County of Namur for 50,000 Parisian livres. Renewed papal demands for the commutation of crusading vows provoked further resistance: Richard of Cornwall and his followers swore not to allow their lawful vow to be obstructed by the Holy See or diverted to the shedding of Christian blood, while crusaders committed to the Holy Land, notably Theobald IV, likewise criticised attempts to redirect vows to the Latin Empire.

Baldwin and his crusading army, reportedly numbering over 30,000, departed in late summer 1239. Marching through Germany and Hungary, they reached Bulgaria, where Ivan Asen—despite his alliance with John Vatatzes—granted them safe passage, allowing their arrival in Thrace in early 1240. With Cuman support, they recaptured Tzurulum from the Nicaeans. Thereafter, as Fine observes, the crusaders disappeared "into obscurity", some likely returning home while others entered the service of the Latin Empire. Meanwhile, Emperor Frederick's expansion in Italy caused a rupture with the papacy. Pope Gregory excommunicated him, citing, among other reasons, his reluctance to support crusading efforts for the Holy Land and the Latin Empire. After Frederick attacked Rome, Gregory proclaimed a crusade against him in February 1240. Thereafter, Gregory's interest in crusading against the Latin Empire's enemies declined markedly. Although in October he still instructed the French prelates to allocate most accumulated crusading funds to the Empire's defence, he did not order new forces to be raised. Nevertheless, in the early 1240s inquisitors continued to compel those accused of heresy in Occitania to take the cross for Constantinople.

== Curtailment ==
=== First Council of Lyon ===
In the late 1230s, the Mongol Empire, a formidable new power, entered Eastern and South-Eastern Europe. Mongol expansion compelled several Cuman groups to abandon the Pontic steppes and seek refuge in Hungary, Bulgaria, the Latin Empire, and Nicaea. The Cumans had traditionally been allies of Bulgaria, and their disappearance as an independent political force weakened the Bulgarian position. In 1241 the Mongols invaded Hungary and, following their withdrawal in the subsequent year, marched through Bulgaria. The Bulgarian tsar, Ivan Asen II, died shortly before these events. His son and successor, Koloman, a minor, succeeded him. With Bulgaria weakened, the Nicaean emperor John III Vatatzes began planning the conquest of the Bulgarian vassal Empire of Thessalonica and concluded a two-year truce with the Latin emperor Baldwin II in August 1241, later extended for a further year in 1244. In 1242 Vatatzes made his first attempt to seize Thessaloniki; however, news of the Mongol advance into Anatolia compelled him to abandon the siege, though not before persuading the city's ruler, John Komnenos Doukas, to renounce the imperial title in exchange for that of despot. The following year, the Mongols defeated the army of the Sultanate of Rum at the Battle of Köse Dağ, reducing it to vassal status and prompting Sultan Kaykhusraw II to seek an alliance with Vatatzes.

Pope Gregory IX died in August 1241. The brief pontificate of his successor, Celestine IV, was followed by a prolonged sede vacante, as Innocent IV was elected only in June 1243. Innocent proclaimed the defence of the Latin Empire a central element of his papacy, stating in a letter to Geoffrey II of Achaea that without Latin rule in Constantinople the Church would be "deformed like a body missing a limb". In his early correspondence he further emphasised that Constantinople had been won and preserved at considerable cost in effort and bloodshed, implying that renewed exertions were necessary lest earlier sacrifices prove in vain. In the absence of substantial western support, Baldwin II travelled through western Europe in 1243, first attempting, unsuccessfully, to mediate a reconciliation between Frederick and the papacy.

On 23 August 1244 Khwarazmian freebooters sacked Jerusalem, and on 17 October, while serving the Egyptian sultan As-Salih Ayyub, defeated the Jerusalemite field army at the Battle of La Forbie. This disaster prompted Pope Innocent IV to convene the First Council of Lyon. Alongside the need for ecclesiastical reform, the defence of the Holy Land, the conflict between Frederick II and the papacy, and the Mongol threat, the precarious condition of the Latin Empire was presented at the council as one of the "five wounds" requiring remedy. In his opening address, the Pope stressed that the advance of "Greek schismatics" had reduced the Latin Empire to little more than Constantinople itself. Baldwin was seated at the Pope's right, signalling his pre-eminent status, while Nicholas, the Latin patriarch of Constantinople, described the grave circumstances of his see. Practical assistance was set out in the decree Arduis mens, which for three years assigned to the defence of the Latin Empire half the revenues of benefices whose holders had been unlawfully absent for more than six months, together with a tenth of papal income. Additionally, the council imposed a levy of twenty per cent on clerical incomes to finance crusading campaigns in the Holy Land and the Latin Empire. Nevertheless, the council did not authorise the preaching of a crusade for the Latins of Constantinople, whereas a new crusade was proclaimed for the Holy Land.

The decree was soon suspended in Germany, where crusading revenues were diverted to campaigns against Frederick II and his descendants. Representatives of the English aristocracy had already opposed papal taxation at the council; thereafter, both a synod of English clergy and a royal assembly expressed reservations on the matter. In Canterbury, clergy and townspeople addressed a letter to the cardinals, asserting that part of the money was intended "for the use of the French, who persecute us and our race, and for the conquest of the empire of the Greeks". French clerics likewise opposed the onerous levy, prompting the pope to reduce it. In response to this widespread resistance, the pope appointed Cardinal Peter of Collemezzo to undertake a "clarification and modification" of several aspects of the levy, which resulted in a further reduction; after 1247 it was no longer collected in practice.

=== Crusade bulls ===
On 29 September 1245 Pope Innocent IV issued Inter cetera desiderabilia, his first bull proclaiming a crusade in support of the Latin Empire. The bull instructed mendicant friars to promote the expedition as serving the interests of the Holy Land, the Catholic faith, and the liberty of the Church, urging the faithful to assist the Latins either through military service or financial contributions. Surviving evidence indicates that the crusade was preached in Provence, England, and Poland, while subsidies for the defence of Constantinople were also collected in Lombardy and Portugal. An additional directive granting absolution to those who had acted fraudulently during the collection of funds, provided that "adequate restitution" was made, suggests the practical difficulties encountered in raising the required revenues. Crusading activity, however, was largely dominated by the conflict between Emperor Frederick II and the papacy, as well as by Louis IX of France's preparations for the Seventh Crusade, which absorbed the greater part of available crusading resources. The Latin emperor Baldwin II continued his western journey, seeking assistance from Louis IX, Henry III of England, and the infante Alfonso of Castile, but without success. Blanche of Castile, the mother of Louis IX, reportedly described Baldwin as "childlike in his speech" and advised him not to employ Greeks as advisors.

In 1246 Baldwin concluded an agreement with Pelay Pérez Correa, Grand Master of the Order of Santiago, concerning the order's participation in the defence of Constantinople. The terms provided that the Grand Master should lead to the city a force of 300 knights, 200 archers and 1,000 infantry, to serve for two years, in return for a lump sum of 40,000 marks sterling and grants of land to secure the order's permanent establishment in the Latin Empire. Baldwin II was unable to meet this financial obligation, and the agreement was never implemented. James I of Aragon likewise pledged to undertake a crusading expedition to Constantinople—probably, in Chrissos's view, to enhance his prestige—but soon obtained absolution owing to internal difficulties within his kingdom. Pope Innocent's final reference to crusading on behalf of the Latin Empire appears in a letter addressed to Béla IV of Hungary in February 1247, in which he promised assistance against the Mongols, if necessary, by diverting crusaders pledged to the Holy Land or to the Latin Empire. Baldwin's journey in Western Europe ultimately proved unsuccessful, and he returned to Constantinople in 1248 unaccompanied by a crusading army.

=== Fall of the Latin Empire ===
With his Anatolian possessions secured through his alliance with the Seljuks of Rum, the Nicaean emperor John III Vatatzes visited his European territories in Thrace in 1246. There he received news of the sudden death—rumoured to have resulted from poisoning—of the young Koloman of Bulgaria, who was succeeded by his underage half-brother Michael II Asen. Taking advantage of the situation, Vatatzes seized, largely without bloodshed, several towns and fortresses in Macedonia, including Serres, Skopje and Prilep. He then marched on Thessaloniki and, with the support of sympathisers among the citizenry, took possession of the city in November 1246. During the ensuing period he prepared for a final assault on Constantinople, concluding peace with Michael II of Epiros, and settling peasants on lands in Thrace in return for military service.

In 1249 Vatatzes dispatched the Dominican friar Salimbene, described as half-Greek, to the papal curia to initiate negotiations concerning ecclesiastical union. According to Chrissis, these discussions were intended to neutralise the papacy in the event that he succeeded in capturing Constantinople. Pope Innocent appointed the Minister general of the Franciscans, John of Parma, as his representative. He attended the synod of Nymphaeum, at which matters such as the filioque, papal primacy, and even the Greek claims to Constantinople were debated. During a subsequent visit by a Nicaean delegation to Rome, a compromise appeared close; however, by the end of 1254 all the principal protagonists of the proposed union—Patriarch Manuel II of Constantinople, Vatatzes, and Pope Innocent—were dead. Despite ongoing negotiations, Pope Innocent had already, in February 1253, authorised the newly appointed Latin Patriarch of Constantinople, Pantaleone Giustinian, to preach the crusade within the Latin Empire and in Venice.

Vatatzes left Nicaea to his son, Theodore II Lascaris. The Bulgarians subsequently attempted to recover territories lost during Vatatzes's reign, but had failed by 1256. The newly elected pope, Alexander IV showed no particular commitment to crusading in the Aegean, offering only general assurances of his resolve to defend the Latin Empire. Instead, he directed crusading efforts against his adversaries in Italy, notably Manfred of Sicily, the illegitimate son of Emperor Frederick II, and the Ghibelline lords Ezzelino and Alberich da Romano. At Emperor Theodore's instigation, negotiations concerning ecclesiastical union were briefly sustained; yet once his position had been consolidated, he allowed them to lapse.

In 1256 hostilities between Epirus and Nicaea resumed, and Michael II of Epirus secured an alliance with Manfred through territorial concessions. After Theodore II's death in August 1258, Michael Palaiologos became regent for Theodore's underage son John IV Laskaris. Michael II allied with Manfred and William II of Achaea, while Palaiologos recruited Cuman and Turkoman mercenaries and gained support from Hungary and Serbia. The Nicaeans won a decisive victory at the Battle of Pelagonia in June 1259. Preparing to attack Constantinople, Palaiologos concluded the Treaty of Nymphaeum, obtaining Genoese naval aid against Venice in return for commercial privileges. Yet on 25 July 1261 the Nicaean general Alexios Strategopoulos seized the city almost without resistance, exploiting the Latin garrison's absence. Three weeks later Palaiologos was crowned Emperor Michael VIII. He soon deposed and blinded John IV, incurring excommunication from Patriarch Arsenius of Constantinople.

== Bibliography ==
- Chrissis, Nikolaos G. (2013). Crusading in Frankish Greece: A Study of Byzantine-Western Relations and Attitudes, 1204-1282. Brepols. ISBN 978-2-503-53423-7.
- Ducellier, Alain (2017) [2008]. "Balkan Powers: Albania, Serbia, and Bulgaria (120–1300)". In Shepard, Jonathan (ed.). The Cambridge History of the Byzantine Empire, c. 500–1492. Cambridge University Press. pp. 779–802. ISBN 978-0-521-83231-1.
- Fine, John V. A. (2009) [1994]. The Late Medieval Balkans: A Critical Survey from the Late Twelfth Century to the Ottoman Conquest. The University of Michigan Press. ISBN 978-0-472-08260-5.
- Gerland, Ernst (1905). Geschichte des lateinischen Kaiserreiches von Konstantinopel, I. Teil: Geschichte des Kaisers Balduin I. und Heinrich, 1204-1216 [History of the Latin Empire of Constantinople, Part I: The Reigns of Emperor Baldwin I and Henry, 1204–1216] (in German). self-published. OCLC 315067843.
- Lock, Peter (2006). The Routledge Companion to the Crusades. Routledge Companions to History. Routledge. ISBN 978-0-415-39312-6.
- Norden, Walter (1903). Das Papsttum und Byzanz: Die Trennung der beiden Mächte und das Problem ihrer Wiedervereinigung bis zum Untergange des byzantinischen Reichs (1453) [The Papacy and Byzantium: The Separation of the Two Powers and the Problem of Their Reunification until the Fall of the Byzantine Empire (1453)] (in German). B. Behr's Verlag. OCLC 1196325154.
- Setton, Kenneth M. (1976). The Papacy and the Levant (1204–1571), Volume I: The Thirteenth and Fourteenth Centuries. Memoirs of the American Philosophical Society. Vol. 114. The American Philosophical Society. ISBN 978-0-87169-114-9.
- Treadgold, Warren (1997). A History of the Byzantine State and Society. Stanford University Press. ISBN 978-0-8047-2630-6.
- Tyerman, Christopher (2019). The World of the Crusades: An Illustrated History. Yale University Press. ISBN 978-0-3002-1739-1.
