= Irene Doukaina Laskarina =

Irene
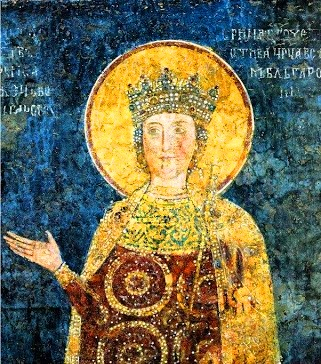

Empress consort of Bulgaria
- Tenure: 1257–1268
- Born: c. 1239; Empire of Nicaea (modern-day Turkey)
- Died: 1268 (aged 28-29); Tarnovo, Bulgaria
- Burial: SS. Forty Martyrs Church in Tarnovo
- Spouses: Constantine Tikh of Bulgaria
- House: Laskaris; House of Asen
- Father: Theodore II Laskaris
- Mother: Elena of Bulgaria

Irene Doukaina Laskarina (Bulgarian: Ирина Ласкарина Асенина, romanized: Irina Doukaina Asenina, Greek: Ειρήνη Δούκαινα Λασκαρίνα, romanized: Eirēnē Doúkaina Laskarina) was empress consort (tsaritsa) of Bulgaria (1258–1268). She was the second wife of Tsar Constantine Tikh of Bulgaria.

She was a daughter of Emperor Theodore II Laskaris of Nicaea, and his wife Elena of Bulgaria, and sister of Nicaean Emperor John IV Laskaris. Her maternal grandparents were Tsar Ivan Asen II and Anna Maria of Hungary.

In 1257, Irene married Bulgarian nobleman Constantine Tikh as his second wife. Her husband was a pretender to the Bulgarian crown. Constantine was proud to be married to a granddaughter of Tsar Ivan Asen II, and he adopted the Bulgarian dynastic name Asen to enhance his claim to the crown. In the next year Constantine was elected Tsar of Bulgaria by a boyar council in Tarnovo and Irene become his consort.

In 1261 Irene's young brother, Emperor John IV Laskaris, was deposed and blinded by Nicaean regent Michael VIII Palaiologos, who had just regained Constantinople from the Latin Empire, re-establishing the Byzantine Empire. Tsaritsa Irene was a bitter enemy of the usurper. She became a leader of the anti-Byzantine party in the Bulgarian court.

Irene died in 1268. She had no children.

== Ancestry ==
Ancestors of Irene Doukaina Laskarina

8. Basil Vatatzes (?)
4. John III Doukas Vatatzes
9. ... Angelina (?)
2. Theodore II Laskaris
10. Theodore I Laskaris
5. Irene Laskarina
11. Anna Komnene Angelina
1. Irene Doukaina Laskarina
12. Ivan Asen I of Bulgaria
6. Ivan Asen II of Bulgaria
13. Elena-Evgenia
3. Elena of Bulgaria
14. Andrew II of Hungary
7. Anna Maria of Hungary
15. Gertrude of Merania

== Sources ==
- Fine, John V. A. (1994) [1987]. The Late Medieval Balkans: A Critical Survey from the Late Twelfth Century to the Ottoman Conquest. Ann Arbor, Michigan: University of Michigan Press. ISBN 978-0-472-10079-8.

Irene Doukaina Laskarina Laskaris Born: ? Died: ?
Royal titles
Preceded by Maria Asenina of Bulgaria	Empress consort of Bulgaria; 1258–1268	Succeeded by Maria Kantakouzena
