= Nikephoros Blemmydes =

Byzantine author (1197–1272)

- Born: 1197; Constantinople, Byzantine Empire
- Died: c. 1269
- Scientific career
- Fields: Philosophy; Theology; Logic; Physics; Medicine; Astronomy
- Academic advisors: Prodromos of Skamandros
- Notable students: George Akropolites; Theodore II Laskaris

Nikephoros Blemmydes (Latinized as Nicephorus Blemmydes; Greek: Νικηφόρος Βλεμμύδης; 1197–1272) was a Byzantine author.

== Biography ==
Blemmydes was born in 1197 in Constantinople as the second child of a physician. After the conquest of Constantinople by the forces of the Fourth Crusade in 1204, he migrated to Asia Minor. There, he received a liberal education in Prusa, Nicaea, Smyrna and Scamander. Blemmydes studied medicine, philosophy, theology, mathematics, astronomy, logic, and rhetoric. When he finally acquired a career as a cleric, he took an active part in the theological controversies between the Eastern Orthodox Church and the Roman Catholic Church, writing treatises on the Procession of the Holy Spirit, advocating the western usage. He was the tutor of the learned Theodore II Laskaris of the Nicaean Empire, and a great collector of classical texts. William of Rubruck reports that his benefactor, John III Doukas Vatatzes, owned a copy of the missing books from Ovid's Fasti.

Blemmydes also founded a school where he taught students such as Prince Theodore II Laskaris and George Akropolites. In his later years, Blemmydes became a monk and retired to a monastery he built in Ephesus. He died in 1272.

== Works ==
- Autobiographia (Curriculum Vitæ)
- Epistula universalior
- Epitome logica
- Epitome physica
- Expositio in Psalmos
- De processione Spiritus Sancti
- De regia pellice templo ejecta (On the Royal Concubine Expelled from the Temple)
- De regis oficiis (On Royal Offices)
- Laudatio Sancti Ioanni Evangelistae
- Orationes de vitae fine (ΑΠΟΔΕΙΞΙΣ, ΟΤΙ ΟΥΧ ΩΡΙΣΤΑΙ ΤΟΥ ΚΑΘΕΚΑΣΤΟΝ Η ΖΩΗ – ΔΙΑΛΕΓΟΜΕΝΟΣ Ή ΠΕΡΙ ΤΟΥ ΟΡΟΥ)
- Regia statua
- Sermo ad monachos suos (Sermon to his monks)
- De virtute et ascesi
