= Elena Asenina of Bulgaria =

Junior Empress Consort of Nicaea
- Tenure: 1235–1252
- Born: 1224; Tarnovo, Bulgarian Empire
- Died: March 1252 (aged 27–28); Nicaea, Empire of Nicaea
- Spouse: Theodore II Laskaris (m. 1235)
- Issue: Irene Doukaina Laskarina; Maria Doukaina Laskarina; Theodora Laskarina; Eudoxia Laskarina Asanina; John IV Laskaris
- Father: Ivan Asen II of Bulgaria
- Mother: Anna Maria, Empress of Bulgaria

Elena Asenina of Bulgaria (Greek: Ελένα Ασανίνα, romanized: Elena Asanina; c.1224 – 1252 CE) (also Helena) was an empress consort of Nicaea, married to Theodore II Laskaris (r. 1254–1258). She was daughter of Bulgarian Emperor Ivan Asen II and Anna Maria of Hungary.

== Life ==
Born in c. 1224 to Bulgarian Emperor Ivan Asen II and Anna Maria of Hungary, she was the sister of emperor Kaliman I of Bulgaria and princess Tamara of Bulgaria. Her maternal grandparents were king Andrew II of Hungary and Gertrude of Merania. On the paternal side, Emperor Ivan Asen I of Bulgaria and Elena of Bulgaria.

She was originally betrothed to Baldwin II of Constantinople, the last Latin emperor. However, as part of an alliance between her father and the Nicaean emperor John III Vatatzes, negotiations began in 1233 on a marriage between her and Vatatzes' son and heir, Theodore II Laskaris. As a condition of this union, the Bulgarians demanded that the Bulgarian patriarchy be restored, while the Nicaeans received territory in Thrace. With these conditions agreed to, the marriage of the two children took place finally in 1235 at Gallipoli.

The marriage was apparently very loving, and her husband mourned deeply after her death (from unknown causes) in the spring of 1252. He was devastated by her loss, and only finally ceased the rituals of deep mourning after his father commanded it, requiring his assistance. Yet, his grief continued, inspiring him to write a series of essays entitled Moral Pieces, that focused on the brevity of life and joy, often revolving around the loss of Elena. In these works, he referred to her as his "soul mate", "a like soul", and the "sharer of my life". Her husband died in 1258 and their son, John IV Laskaris, who was only seven years old, became emperor.

== Family ==
Elena and Theodore had five children:

- Irene Doukaina Laskarina, who married Constantine Tikh of Bulgaria (r. 1,5 when she was 8 years old.7-1277)
- Maria Doukaina Laskarina, who married Nikephoros I Komnenos Doukas of Epirus.
- Theodora, who married Matthew, Baron of Veligosti
- Eudoxia Laskarina Asanina, who married Guglielmo Peire de Ventimiglia
- John IV Laskaris, emperor between 1258 and 1261

== Sources ==
- Fine, John V. A., Jr. (1994) [1987]. The Late Medieval Balkans: A Critical Survey from the Late Twelfth Century to the Ottoman Conquest. Ann Arbor, Michigan: University of Michigan Press. ISBN 978-0-472-10079-8.
- Kazhdan, Alexander, ed. (1991). The Oxford Dictionary of Byzantium. Oxford and New York: Oxford University Press. ISBN 0-19-504652-8.
- Trapp, Erich; Beyer, Hans-Veit; Walther, Rainer; Sturm-Schnabl, Katja; Kislinger, Ewald; Leontiadis, Ioannis; Kaplaneres, Sokrates (1976–1996). Prosopographisches Lexikon der Palaiologenzeit (in German). Vienna: Verlag der Österreichischen Akademie der Wissenschaften. ISBN 3-7001-3003-1.

Elena Asenina of Bulgaria Asen dynasty Born: c. 1224 Died: 1252
Royal titles
Preceded by Constance II of Hohenstaufen	Empress consort of Nicaea; 1235–1252	Succeeded by Theodora Palaiologina
