= Anna Maria of Hungary =

Anna Maria

Empress consort of Bulgaria
- Tenure: 1221–1237
- Born: 1204; Esztergom, Hungary
- Died: 1237 (aged 32–33); Tarnovo, Bulgaria
- Spouse: Ivan Asen II of Bulgaria
- Issue: Elena; Thamar; Kaliman Asen I Peter
- House: Árpád
- Father: Andrew II of Hungary
- Mother: Gertrude of Merania

Anna Maria of Hungary (1204–1237) was an Empress consort of Bulgaria, daughter of King Andrew II of Hungary and Gertrude of Merania. She was sister of king Béla IV and Saint Elizabeth of Hungary. Her grandmother was Agnes of Antioch from House of Châtillon, the daughter of Raynald of Châtillon

In January 1221 she married Tsar Ivan Asen II of Bulgaria as his second wife. Her father was forced to agree to the marriage to effect his release from Bulgaria, where he had been captured on his return from Crusade in late 1218. Her dowry included the cities of Beograd and Braničevo.

Anna Maria and Ivan Asen II had several children, including:

- Elena, who married Theodore II Doukas Laskaris of the Nicaea.
- Thamar, at one point alleged to be engaged to the future Emperor Michael VIII Palaiologos.
- Kaliman Asen I, who succeeded as emperor of Bulgaria 1241–1246.
- Peter, who died in 1237.

She died of the plague in 1237 and was buried at SS. Forty Martyrs Church in Tarnovo.

Anna Maria of Hungary House of Árpád Born: 1204 Died: 1237
Royal titles
Preceded by Elizabeth of Courtenay	Empress consort of Bulgaria; 1221–1237	Succeeded by Irene Komnene of Epirus
