= John IV Doukas Laskaris =

Emperor of Nicaea from 1258 to 1261

- Emperor and Autocrat of the Romans
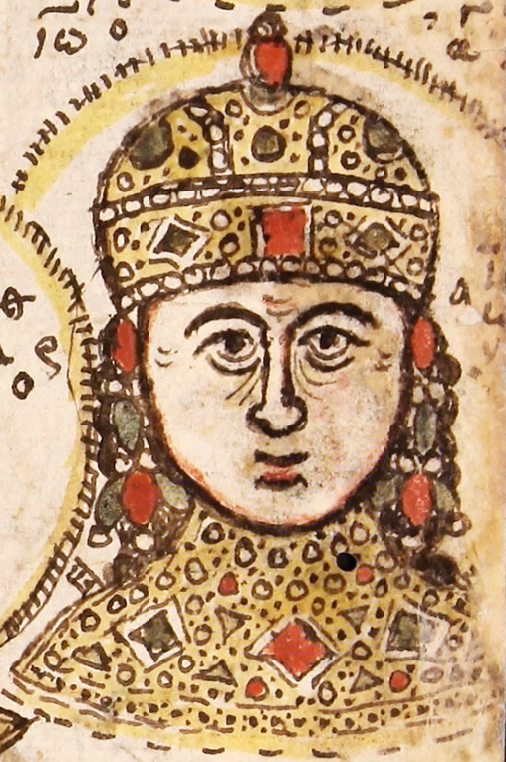
- 15th-century portrait of John IV (from a 15th-century codex containing a copy of the Extracts of History by Joannes Zonaras)

Emperor of Nicaea Claimant Byzantine Emperor
- Reign: 16 August 1258 – 25 December 1261
- Predecessor: Theodore II Doukas Laskaris
- Successor: Michael VIII Palaiologos
- Born: 25 December 1250
- Died: c. 1305
- Burial: Saint Demetrios Monastery, Constantinople
Names
- John Doukas Laskaris; Ἰωάννης Δούκας Λάσκαρις
- House: Laskaris/Vatatzes
- Father: Theodore II Doukas Laskaris
- Mother: Elena Asenina of Bulgaria
- Religion: Eastern Orthodoxy

John IV Doukas Laskaris (or Ducas Lascaris) (Greek: Ἰωάννης Δούκας Λάσκαρις, romanized: Iōánnēs Doúkās Láskaris; December 25, 1250 – c. 1305) was the fourth emperor of the Nicaean Empire from August 16, 1258 to December 25, 1261, one of the Greek successor states formed after the Sack of Constantinople by the Roman Catholics during the Fourth Crusade. He was the last emperor from the prominent Laskarid dynasty and the last to only rule Nicaea before the Reconquest of Constantinople by his successor in 1261.

== Biography ==
John was a son of Theodore II Doukas Laskaris, the 3rd Emperor of Nicaea, and Elena of Bulgaria. His maternal grandparents were Emperor Ivan Asen II of Bulgaria and his second wife Anna Maria of Hungary. Anna was originally named Mária and was the eldest daughter of Andrew II of Hungary and Gertrude of Merania.

John IV was only seven years old when he inherited the throne on the death of his father. The young monarch was the last member of the Laskarid dynasty, which had done much to restore the Byzantine Empire. His regent was originally the bureaucrat George Mouzalon, but Mouzalon was murdered by the nobility, and the nobles' leader Michael Palaiologos usurped the post. Soon, on January 1, 1259, Palaiologos made himself co-emperor as Michael VIII. Michael was, in fact, John's second cousin once removed, since they were both descended from Empress Euphrosyne Doukaina Kamatera. After Michael's conquest of Constantinople from the Latin Empire on July 25, 1261, John IV was left behind at Nicaea, and was later blinded on Michael's orders on his eleventh birthday, December 25, 1261. This made him ineligible for the throne, and he was exiled and imprisoned in a fortress in Bithynia. This action led to the excommunication of Michael VIII Palaiologos by the Patriarch Arsenius Autoreianus, and a later revolt led by a Pseudo-John IV near Nicaea.

John IV spent the remainder of his life as a monk in Dacibyza. There is a rescript of Charles of Anjou, dated 9 May 1273, which refers to a report that John escaped from his imprisonment and invites him to come to his court. Further documents attest to his arrival and receiving a pension from the Angevin arch-enemy of Michael Palaiologos. However, this contradicts the evidence of the historians George Pachymeres and Nikephoros Gregoras, who record that John remained in Dacibyza until long after Michael's death. In his study of Michael VIII's reign, historian Deno John Geanakoplos discusses the contradictory evidence and comes to the conclusion that the documents of Charles of Anjou were intended to serve as propaganda, "to attract the support of the legitimist, pro-Lascarid Greeks of the Byzantine Empire, as well as to sway the anti-Angevin sentiment of the still surviving Greek population of Charles' own territories of southern Italy and Sicily."

In 1290 John was visited by Michael VIII's son and successor Andronikos II Palaiologos, who sought forgiveness for his father's blinding three decades earlier. As Donald Nicol notes, "The occasion must have been embarrassing for both parties, but especially for Andronikos who, after all, was the beneficiary of his father's crimes against John Laskaris." The deposed emperor died about 1305 and was eventually recognized as a saint, whose memory was revered in Constantinople in the 14th century.

== Bibliography ==
- Geanakoplos, Deno John (1959). Emperor Michael Palaeologus and the West, 1258–1282: A Study in Byzantine-Latin Relations. Cambridge, Massachusetts: Harvard University Press.
- Hackel, Sergei (2001). The Byzantine saint (2001 ed.). St Vladimir's Seminary Press. ISBN 0-88141-202-3. - Total pages: 245
- Nicol, Donald M. (1993) [1972]. The Last Centuries of Byzantium, 1261–1453 (Second ed.). Cambridge: Cambridge University Press. ISBN 978-0-521-43991-6.

John IV Doukas Laskaris Laskarid dynasty Born: 25 December 1250 Died: unknown 1305
Regnal titles
Preceded by Theodore II Doukas Laskaris	Emperor of Nicaea; 1258–1261 with Michael VIII Palaiologos (1259–1261)	Succeeded by Michael VIII Palaiologos
