= Theodore II Laskaris =

Emperor of Nicaea from 1254 to 1258

Theodore II Doukas Laskaris
- Emperor and Autocrat of the Romans
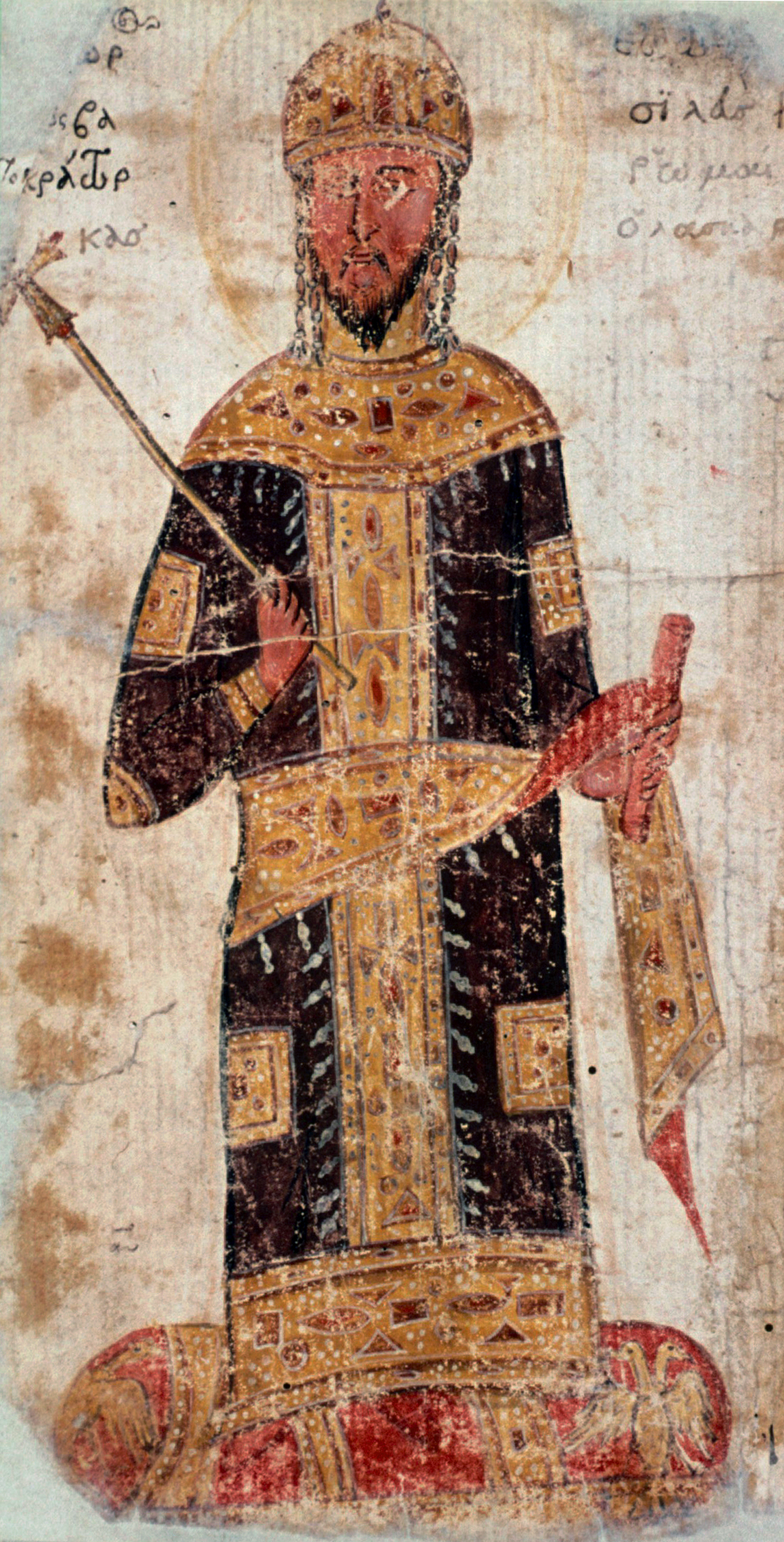
- Miniature of Theodore II from the manuscript of Georgius Pachymeres' Historia, 14th century

Emperor of Nicaea
- Reign: 4 November 1254 – 16 August 1258
- Acclamation: 1235 as co-emperor
- Predecessor: John III Doukas Vatatzes
- Successor: John IV Doukas Laskaris
- Born: November 1221/1222; Nicaea
- Died: 16 August 1258 (aged 36/37); Magnesia
- Spouse: Elena of Bulgaria
- Issue more...: Irene Doukaina Laskarina; Eudoxia Laskarina; John IV Doukas Laskaris
Names
- Theodore Doukas Laskaris; Θεόδωρος Δούκας Λάσκαρης
- House: Laskaris (matrilineal); Vatatzes (patrilineal)
- Father: John III Doukas Vatatzes
- Mother: Irene Laskarina

Theodore II Doukas Laskaris or Ducas Lascaris (Greek: Θεόδωρος Δούκας Λάσκαρις, romanized: Theodōros Doúkās Láskaris; November 1221/1222 – 16 August 1258) was Emperor of Nicaea from 1254 to 1258. He was the only child of Emperor John III Doukas Vatatzes and Empress Irene Laskarina. His mother was the eldest daughter of Theodore I Laskaris, who had established the Empire of Nicaea as a successor state to the Byzantine Empire in Asia Minor after the crusaders captured the Byzantine capital, Constantinople, during the Fourth Crusade in 1204. Theodore received an excellent education from two renowned scholars, Nikephoros Blemmydes and George Akropolites. He made friends with young intellectuals, especially with a page of low birth, George Mouzalon. Theodore began to write treatises on theological, historical and philosophical themes in his youth.

Emperor John III arranged for Theodore to marry Elena Asenina in 1235, to forge an alliance with her father, Ivan Asen II, Emperor of Bulgaria, against the Latin Empire of Constantinople. According to Theodore himself, their marriage was happy, and they had five or six children. From 1241, Theodore acted as his father's lieutenant in Asia Minor during his frequent military campaigns in the Balkan Peninsula. From around 1242, he was his father's co-ruler, but was not crowned as co-emperor. During this period, his relationship with some prominent aristocrats, particularly Theodore Philes and Michael Palaiologos, grew tense.

Theodore succeeded his father on 4 November 1254. He dismissed many high officials and army commanders of aristocratic origin, replacing them with loyal friends, including some of low birth. The same year, he made a defensive alliance with Kaykaus II, the Seljuk Sultan of Rum, against the Mongol Empire. In 1256, he repelled a Bulgarian invasion of Thrace and Macedonia and forced Michael II Komnenos Doukas, the ruler of Epirus, to cede Dyrrachium on the coast of the Adriatic Sea to Nicaea. He reformed the military, recruiting more soldiers from among the native peasantry of Asia Minor. Eventually, Michael II of Epirus forged an alliance with Stefan Uroš I, King of Serbia, and Manfred of Sicily against Nicaea. Theodore's newly appointed generals could not resist their joint invasion in 1257. Theodore fell seriously ill and could rarely take part in state administration during the last months of his life. He appointed George Mouzalon regent for his underage son, John IV, before dying of either chronic epilepsy or cancer. In ten days, Mouzalon fell victim to an aristocratic plot, and Michael Palaiologos assumed the regency, usurping the throne soon after.

== Early life ==
=== Childhood ===
Theodore was born to Emperor John III Doukas Vatatzes (r. 1221–1254) and Irene Laskarina in the imperial palace in Nicaea in late 1221 or early 1222. Irene was the eldest daughter of Theodore I Laskaris (r. 1205–1221), the founder of the Empire of Nicaea. Nicaea was a successor state of the Byzantine Empire, established after the Catholic ("Latin") crusaders captured Constantinople during the Fourth Crusade in 1204. Vatatzes was Irene's third husband. He was born into a Byzantine aristocratic family related to the imperial dynasties of Komnenos and Angelos, and served as the commander of the imperial guard. Although Irene's two brothers had died prematurely, Theodore I did not name Vatatzes as his official heir. He most likely expected that his third wife, the Latin Maria of Courtenay, would bear sons, but he did not father children with her. Theodore I died in November 1221. Vatatzes had to defeat the late emperor's brothers, Alexios and Isaac Laskaris, to seize the throne. His victory over them and their Latin allies in the Battle of Poimanenon in the winter of 1223–1224 opened the way for the reconquest of Byzantine territories lost to the Latins in Asia Minor.

Theodore was his parents' only child. His mother had been in a horse riding accident and could not bear children after his birth. He adopted his mother's family name. He was "raised as usual for a royal child", according to his own words, most probably referring to his upbringing in the women's quarter of the palace and the luxury surrounding him. His childhood was joyful and he "often received greatest solace" from his father. He also remembered his parents did not punish him when his tutor had accused him of misdemeanors.

=== Education ===
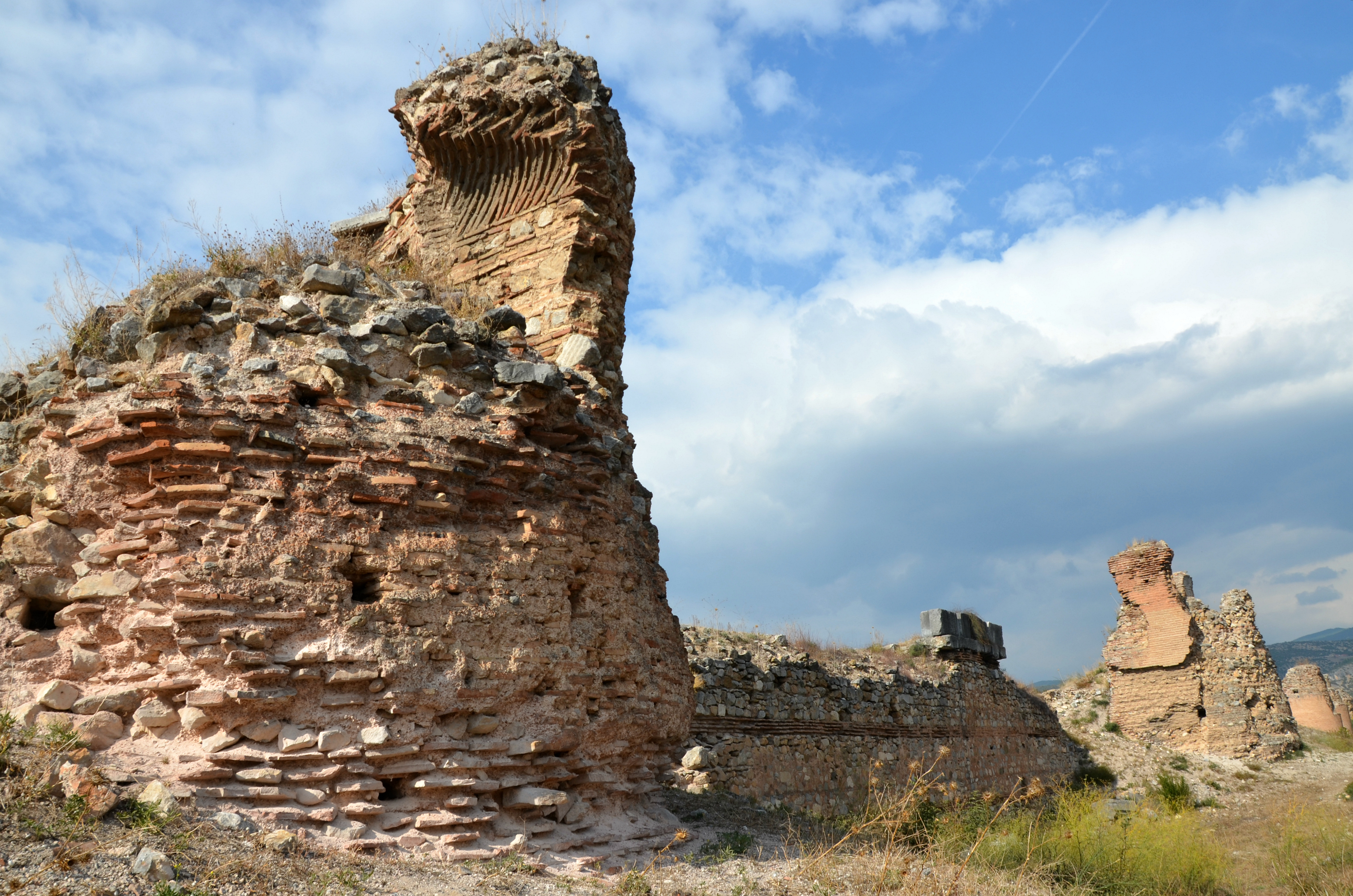
Ruins of the walls of Nicaea (now İznik in Turkey)

Theodore was probably entrusted to an elementary teacher's care in 1228 as most Nicaean aristocratic children's formal education began around the age of six. As part of his education, he memorized texts from the Bible and prayed three times a day. He could quote from the Psalms and the parables of Jesus by heart until the end of his life. Theodore's secondary education began around 1230. He detested his principal tutor (or baioulos) and described him as a "great babbler" in his works, without mentioning his name. He studied grammar (that is Attic Greek), poetry, rhetoric, logic, mathematics, astronomy, geometry and music for three years. His grammatical studies raised his lifelong interest in words with multiple meanings and in etymologies. The young Theodore was captivated by the orations of Demosthenes and Hermogenes of Tarsus. He also held theologian Gregory of Nazianzus in high esteem. His tutor mocked him for "philosophizing" and urged Theodore to spend more time with military and diplomatic studies. Theodore was a passionate hunter and polo player with remarkable riding skills.

Negotiations over Theodore's marriage with Elena Asenina began shortly after the Battle of Klokotnitsa, where Elena's father, Emperor (or Tzar) Ivan Asen II of Bulgaria (r. 1218–1241), inflicted a crushing defeat on the Emperor of Thessalonica and ruler of Epirus, Theodore Komnenos Doukas (r. 1215–1230). The battle weakened Epirus–Thessalonica, Nicaea's western rival for the revival of the Byzantine Empire, and made Bulgaria the dominant power of the Balkan Peninsula. The marriage of Theodore and Elena sealed their fathers' alliance against the Latin Empire of Constantinople in 1235. In the same year, Bulgarian and Nicaean troops laid siege to Constantinople, but could not capture the city. In 1237, Ivan Asen then reversed his position, allying himself with the Latins to stop Nicaean expansion in Thrace, only to return to his alliance with Nicaea before the end of the year. His father-in-law's tactical moves convinced Theodore that he could not fully trust the Bulgarians—a view he held for the rest of his life.

Theodore took philosophy classes from a most renowned teacher, Nikephoros Blemmydes. As Blemmydes was the hegumenos (abbot) of a monastery at Ephesus, Theodore attended his classes while he was staying in his father's winter palace at nearby Nymphaion. Blemmydes' zealous Aristotelianism had a strong impact on Theodore, who often mentioned Aristotelian notions, like potentiality and actuality, in his writings. Blemmydes was accused of embezzlement by one of his students early in the 1240s. Although Vatatzes' intervention saved him from imprisonment, he abandoned teaching. Theodore continued to visit Blemmydes regularly and maintained a correspondence with him. A young scholar, George Akropolites, replaced Blemmydes as Theodore's principal tutor. Born in Constantinople, Akropolites had firsthand experience with the Latin rule in the city. He completed Theodore's education in logic and mathematics. Also a historian, Akropolites would complete the most detailed chronicle of the Empire of Nicaea.

Theodore's mother died late in 1239. Vatatzes remarried in late summer of 1240, taking an illegitimate daughter of Frederick II, Holy Roman Emperor (r. 1220–1250), Constanza, whose name was changed to Anna. She was around ten and Vatatzes started a scandalous affair with one of her Italian ladies-in-waiting, named Marchesina. She was granted the right to wear purple shoes and to harness her horse with purple trappings, like the Emperor's closest relatives.

== Youth ==
=== First administrative tasks ===
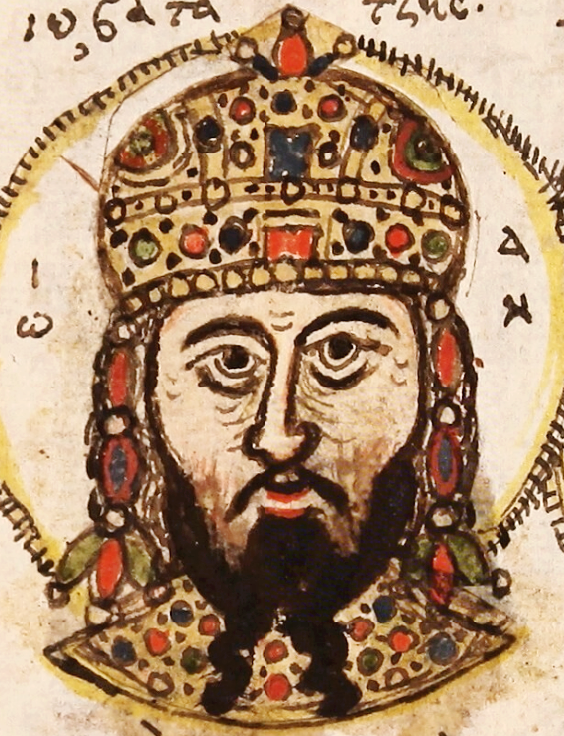
15th-century portrait of John III Vatatzes (from the Mutinensis gr. 122)

If Vatatzes followed the practice of his predecessors, Theodore was proclaimed co-ruler while still a child. In his history, Akropolites mentioned Theodore as a co-emperor when narrating events that occurred from 1235 to 1237 and in 1242. In his correspondence, Theodore referred to himself as "my imperial majesty" from around 1242. He was not crowned during his father's lifetime—a likely explanation for the denial of his co-emperorship by two later Byzantine historians, George Pachymeres and Nicephorus Gregoras. Theodore's authority was considerable: he granted estates and salaries and intervened in legal disputes. On Blemmydes' petition, he ordered Nikephoros, the metropolitan bishop of Ephesus, to return an allegedly unlawfully purchased piece of land to Blemmydes' monastery. During his father's absence, he presided over sessions of the privy council and proposed candidates to vacant Church offices.

John III Vatatzes again laid siege to Constantinople in May 1241, but he quickly realized he could not capture the city. He started peace negotiations, and Theodore accompanied his father to the meetings with the Latin envoys. They signed a two-year truce on 24 June. Ivan II Asen died in the same month and his death weakened Bulgaria. Vatatzes launched a military campaign against the Bulgarians' Epirote allies late in 1241. Before departing for the military campaign, he appointed Theodore his lieutenant in Asia Minor. Theodore, like his father and grandfather, held an itinerant court and visited most Nicaean towns and villages in Anatolia.

At this time, a Mongol general, Baiju, invaded Nicaea's eastern neighbor, the Seljuk Sultanate of Rum, from the east and captured Erzurum. Theodore informed his father, who was besieging Thessalonica, but Vatatzes did not abandon the siege. His persistence was rewarded when the ruler of Thessalonica John Komnenos Doukas (r. 1237–1244) renounced the title of emperor in return for the Byzantine court title of despot from Vatatzes. The Mongols launched a new military campaign against the Seljuks and routed Sultan Kaykhusraw II (r. 1237–1246) at the Battle of Köse Dağ on 26 June 1243. After the Seljuks agreed to pay a yearly tribute to the Mongols, Nicaea remained the only Anatolian state that preserved full independence. The fear of a Mongol invasion became a constant element of Nicaean diplomacy.

Vatatzes again charged Theodore with the administration of Asia Minor when he launched a new military campaign in Thrace in 1246. After Vatatzes captured Serres, the leading citizens of Thessalonica did not risk a prolonged siege. They opened the gates of their city and paid voluntary homage to Vatatzes. As most Macedonian towns followed their example, Vatatzes almost doubled his empire's territory.

=== Friends and critics ===
Theodore forged a bond of close friendship with a circle of young intellectuals. All born after the Latin conquest of Constantinople, they did not experience the shock of exile, unlike many of their fathers' "humiliated generation" (as Patriarch Germanus II of Constantinople referred to them). His friends' companionship helped Theodore come through his periods of melancholy, likely caused by anxiety over his public duties. His closest friend, George Mouzalon, was a page in his retinue during their childhood. The three Mouzalon brothers—George, Theodore and Andronikos—were, in Blemmydes's words, "of despicably low birth", but they were talented singers and musicians. Most of Theodore's other confidants, like Joseph Mesopotamites and Konstas Hagiotheodorites, were related to high-ranking officials and churchmen.

His fellows often teased Theodore for his style of reasoning during philosophical discussions. His friends' mockery upset him but critical remarks made by bishops and aristocrats were more dangerous to his reputation. Metropolitan Nikephoros of Ephesus rebuked him for his pride and for his non-observance of the rules of fasting. The governor of Thessalonica, Theodore Philes, circulated defamatory poems about Theodore's alleged affair with an unnamed woman. Philes's accusations reached the ears of Blemmydes, and Theodore could not convince his former tutor of his innocence. Blemmydes did not tolerate sexual misconduct, and completed a mirror for princes (instruction), entitled Imperial Statue, warning both Theodore and his father against lechery. On the other hand, Theodore often made fun of bishops for their self-aggrandizement, their barbaric speech or ignorantly heretical statements, or even for their physical appearance.

=== Towards sole rule ===
Vatatzes was making preparations for a new attack on Constantinople in the spring of 1252, but the ruler of Epirus, Michael II Komnenos Doukas (r. 1230–1266/68), invaded Nicaean territory in Macedonia. Vatatzes appointed Theodore his viceroy in Asia Minor and launched a counter-attack against Michael II, forcing him to return to Epirus. Elena of Bulgaria died unexpectedly of unknown causes before the end of August. Theodore mourned his wife for more than the customary forty days. He abandoned fasting and wearing black only on his father's command. His wife's death intensified Theodore's melancholy. He secluded himself in the palace and dedicated his time to philosophical studies and writing. He only resumed his regular visits to the towns of Asia Minor in 1253.

Early in 1253, Emperor Frederick II's son and successor, Conrad (r. 1250–1254), forced most relatives of his father's mistress, Bianca Lancia, into exile. They fled to Nicaea and sought asylum from Bianca's daughter, Empress Constanza-Anna. Since his father was staying in Thrace, the exiles were received by Theodore. Conrad changed his mind and sent the erudite Berthold of Hohenburg, an in-law of the Lancias, to Nicaea to begin negotiations with them. While waiting for his father's return from Thrace, Theodore had philosophical conversations with Hohenburg. The study of ancient Greek philosophers had intensified in Europe, and Hohenburg asked Theodore for Greek philosophical works. This request reinforced Theodore's pride in the Greeks' ancient heritage, and he decided to publish his own works.

Vatatzes returned to Nicaea in the winter of 1253. Early in 1254, he fell ill suddenly and never fully recovered. His illness made Theodore the actual ruler of the empire. Vatatzes was still alive when news of the Mongols' preparations for a new invasion of Asia Minor reached Nicaea.

== Reign ==
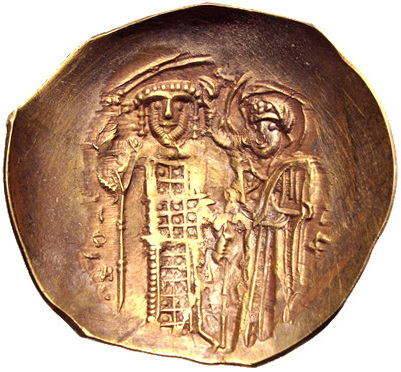
Hyperpyron of Theodore II issued during his first regnal year, depicting him alongside the Virgin Mary

=== Accession ===
John III Vatatzes died in Nicaea on 4 November 1254, leaving a flourishing empire to Theodore. Theodore was acclaimed emperor, but he was not crowned because the patriarchal throne was vacant. In his funerary speech at Vatatzes' burial, Akropolites expressed his hope that Theodore would lead the Nicaeans to expel the Latins from Constantinople, comparing him with the "pillar of fire" of the Book of Exodus, guiding the Israelites. Theodore could not risk launching an attack against Constantinople, because his empire was surrounded by hostile powers.

Theodore forbade his father's widow, Anna-Constanza, from returning to her Sicilian homeland. This act outraged her brother, Manfred (r. 1258–1266), who had recently assumed power in the Kingdom of Sicily. (Note: Just like Anna-Constanza, Manfred was an illegitimate child of Emperor Frederick II by Bianca Lancia. When their legitimate half-brother Conrad IV died in May 1254, Berthold of Hohenburg assumed the regency for Conrad's underage son Conradin (r. 1254–1258) in Sicily, but Berthold was forced to abdicate in Manfred's favor in August. Four years later, Manfred was crowned king of Sicily.) Theodore had a meeting with the Seljuk Sultan of Rum, Kaykaus II (r. 1246–1262), in Philadelphia. They concluded a defensive alliance against the Mongols. Kaykaus had acknowledged the Mongols' suzerainty, but had not visited the court of Great Khan Möngke to pay homage to him.

Theodore wanted to make Blemmydes the new patriarch, but his old tutor refused. His next candidate, a hermit with an aristocratic background, Arsenios Autoreianos, accepted the offer. The new patriarch crowned and anointed Theodore emperor—on Christmas 1254. According to sources hostile to Arsenios, he was Theodore's sole nominee to the patriarchal throne although tradition required the presentation of three candidates to the electors. Arsenios's allegedly irregular appointment would give rise to the conflict known as the "Arsenite Schism", lasting from 1265 to 1310. Arsenios was always Theodore's loyal supporter and obeyed his commands.

Theodore did not trust the aristocrats and wrote of "illicit love affairs and very unjust plots", without naming his opponents, in a letter addressed to George Mouzalon in December 1254. The historian Michael Angold proposes that Emperor Frederick II's similar policy may have inspired Theodore's "more autocratic stance towards his aristocracy". Theodore appointed George Mouzalon to be the new megas domestikos (or commander-in-chief) of the mobile army. George's brother, Andronikos, was designated as the new protovestiarites (commander of the guards of the imperial palace). Theodore also demonstrated his favor towards a general of common origin, Constantine Margarites. He offered offices to some aristocrats who had been put aside during his father's reign. He recalled his mother's uncles, Michael and Manuel Laskaris, from their exile and made two members of the rebellious Nestongos family, George and Isaac, generals. His appointments offended most aristocrats.

=== Wars with Bulgaria ===
The young Bulgarian Tzar, Michael II Asen (r. 1246–1256/57), took advantage of Vatatzes' death to reconquer the lands he had seized from Bulgaria after 1241. Michael invaded Macedonia and Thrace in December 1254 or January 1255. Most Nicaean garrisons in the local fortresses were small, and the local Bulgarians supported the invaders. The Bulgarians quickly seized most Thracian fortresses. Two Macedonian towns, Veles and Skopje, also surrendered to them. A hastily summoned council of war accepted George Mouzalon's proposal of an immediate counter-attack. Theodore decided to lead the campaign himself, and entrusted Mouzalon with the administration of Asia Minor in February 1255. His surprise attack forced the invaders to withdraw from Thrace, and he ordered two Nicaean aristocrats, Alexios Strategopoulos and Demetrios Tornikes, to pursue the Bulgarians. The two generals led their troops across the passes of the Rhodope Mountains in constant fear of an ambush. When they unexpectedly heard the sounds of the horns of shepherds and swineherds, they retreated in a panic, abandoning their baggage. The fiasco outraged Theodore, and he ordered them to hurry to his camp at Adrianople, but both commanders disobeyed.

A Bulgarian renegade in Nicaean service, Dragotas, switched sides and laid siege to Melnik in the summer. Theodore hastily departed from Adrianople to lead relief forces to the town. The Bulgarians laid an ambush for him along the Rupel Pass, but he avoided it and Dragotas abandoned the siege on Theodore's arrival. From Melnik, Theodore went to Thessalonica and dismissed his old opponent, Philes, from the governorship. Theodore closed down the local mint, because he wanted to establish a centralized system of financial administration in Asia Minor, with a new treasury at Astritzion on the Asian coast of the Hellespont. He invaded Macedonia and forced the Bulgarian garrison in Veles to surrender, but drought prevented him from continuing the military campaign across the arid Ovče Pole. He went to Serres, where he confirmed the fiscal privileges of the Macedonian towns. He also ordered the arrest of Constantine Kabasilas, Archbishop of Ohrid, assuming that Kabasilas was Michael II of Epirus' loyal supporter.

A report of a Mongol invasion of Asia Minor forced Theodore to leave Macedonia in late autumn of 1255. After the report had proved false, he launched an attack against the fortress of Tzepaina. He had to abandon the campaign, because his army could not pass across the narrow and frosty mountain passes. He returned to Anatolia around the end of the year. He showered his confidants with honors and gifts. He made Manuel Laskaris and Constantine Margarites the commanders-in-chief of his troops in Thrace and charged George Mouzalon with implementing military reforms. In parallel, he turned against members of the old aristocratic families whom he distrusted. Constantine Strategopoulos and Theodore Philes—two aristocrats who had offended him—were blinded. Alexios Strategopoulos and Alexios Raoul's four sons were imprisoned. Theodore's cousin, Michael Palaiologos, fled to the Seljuks to escape imprisonment. Theodore took advantage of the emperors' right to control aristocratic marriages to establish family ties between his lowborn favorites and the old aristocracy. George Mouzalon married Palaiologos' niece, Theodora Kantakouzene Palaiologina, Andronikos Mouzalon wed a daughter of Alexios Raoul.

Theodore decided to resume negotiations about a church union between the Orthodox Nicaean and the Catholic Churches with Pope Alexander IV (r. 1254–1261) and sent envoys to Rome in April or May 1256. (Note: The rift between the two branches of Christianity can be traced back to several factors, such as different views on clerical marriage and fasting, and political conflicts between the Byzantine Empire and the papacy. The schism began with mutual excommunications in 1054, and proved uncurable, although discussions about the union of the two churches began in 1112.) Divergent views on the procession of the Holy Spirit had always been an important cause of the schism between the two Churches. Orthodox theologians maintained that the Holy Spirit proceeded from the Father alone, but Catholic theologians stated that the Holy Spirit proceeded from the Father "and the Son". Theodore commissioned Blemmydes to summarize the Orthodox position. Blemmydes adopted a conciliatory approach, concluding that a statement about the procession of the Holy Spirit from the Father through the Son was fully in conformity with the Bible and the Church Fathers' works. Theodore did not accept his tutor's view and insisted on the traditional Orthodox doctrine.

Michael II of Bulgaria dispatched Cuman raiders to plunder Thrace early in 1256. Although Theodore had instructed Laskaris and Margarites to adopt a defensive strategy, they pursued the Cumans, but the invaders inflicted a heavy defeat on their troops. Theodore assembled a new army, partially mustered among the Anatolian peasantry, and crossed the Hellespont. He sent troops, including Cuman horsemen in his service, against the invaders and they routed the enemy forces in two battles in Thrace. He entered into peace negotiations with Michael II with the mediation of Rostislav Mikhailovich, Duke of Macsó (r. 1254–1262). Michael II had recently married Rostislav's daughter, and Rostislav's wife, Anna of Hungary, was Theodore's cousin. Rostislav came to Thrace to reach an agreement with Theodore. Akropolites drafted a treaty about the restoration of the prewar boundaries between Nicaea and Bulgaria. Rostislav accepted it and signed the peace treaty on Michael II's behalf on 29 June. The treaty prescribed that Michael II cede Tzepaina to the Nicaeans, but the Bulgarian garrison was not withdrawn immediately from the fortress. Theodore became convinced that Rostislav had deceived him and ordered the public whipping of Akropolites. His act proved imprudent, because the Bulgarians ceded the fortress in early September. Theodore sent George Mouzalon to Akropolites to seek a reconciliation.

The peace treaty aroused much indignation in Bulgaria, enabling Michael II's cousin, Kaliman (r. 1256), to stage a plot and dethrone the Tzar. Kaliman seized the throne, but he never gained the support of the army. After Kaliman fell victim to a new plot, Rostislav Mikhailovich and Michael II's brother-in-law, Mitso (r. 1256–1257), laid claim to the throne. Most boyars (noblemen) preferred a third candidate, one of their number, Konstantin Tih (r. 1257–1277), although he was not related to the ruling Asen dynasty.

=== Expansion ===
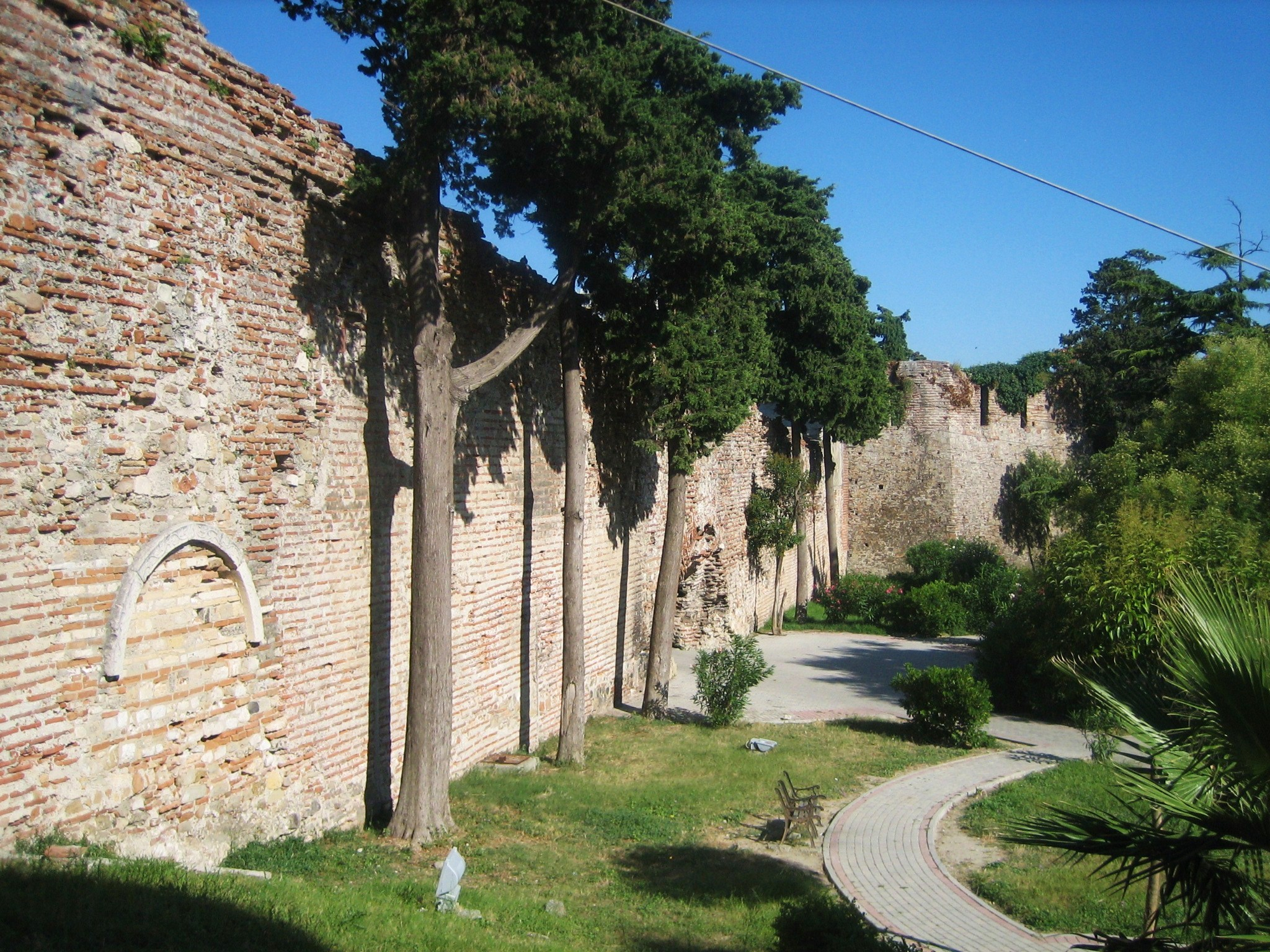
Ruins of the Byzantine fortification around Dyrrachium (now Durrës in Albania)

Theodore's war against Bulgaria brought about a rapprochement between Epirus and Serbia. Michael II of Epirus made a formal alliance with Stefan Uroš I, King of Serbia (r. 1243–1276). He also sent gifts to the Albanian chiefs who had acknowledged Nicaean suzerainty to gain their support. Theodore's daughter, Maria, and Michael II's son and heir, Nikephoros (r. 1266/68–1296/98), had been engaged during Vatatzes' reign. After making peace with the Bulgarians, Theodore ordered Michael II to send Nikephoros to Thessalonica to wed Maria. Nikephoros was accompanied by his mother, Theodora Petraliphaina. Theodore took her into custody, only allowing her to return to Epirus after Michael II ceded Servia and Dyrrachium to him. The possession of the two towns secured the Nicaean control of the Via Egnatia, (Note: This ancient road connected Constantinople and the Adriatic coast across the Balkan Peninsula.) but Michael II remained hostile to Theodore.

Theodore received the papal legate, Bishop Constantine of Orvieto, in Thessalonica. Their negotiations about the church union and a new ecumenical council—a general assembly of Orthodox and Catholic bishops—proved fruitless, because the legate's authorization to make concessions was limited and Theodore was unwilling to make theological concessions. He also preserved the right to convoke the Orthodox bishops to a synod to discuss the conditions of the union. Theodore maintained a correspondence with the Holy See, but he did not initiate new negotiations with it.

The Mongols invaded Asia Minor and defeated Kaykaus II on 14 October 1256. Theodore hurried back to Anatolia to oversee the preparations for its defense. Kaykaus sought asylum in Nicaea and the Mongols installed his brother, Kilij Arslan IV (r. 1246/49–1266), as the new sultan of Rum. Theodore assembled his troops on the plains near Magnesia. The Mongol ruler of Persia, the Ilkhan Hülagü (r. 1256–1265), sent a delegation to Theodore to begin negotiations about Kaykaus' future. Hülegü agreed to withdraw his army from Rum and ordered the division of the sultanate between Kaykaus and Kilij Arslan in the spring of 1257. Before leaving for Rum, Kaykaus ceded four fortresses in the valley of the river Lycus to Nicaea in return for a contingent of 300 auxiliary troops. His achievements made Theodore self-confident. He proudly stated that his empire included territories as far as Dyrrachium on the Adriatic Sea and Cape Karambis on the Black Sea. His success during the war against Bulgaria had convinced him he should recruit soldiers from among Anatolian peasants. In a letter to Blemmydes, he stated that the native "Hellenes" were more reliable than foreign mercenaries.

=== Illness and death ===
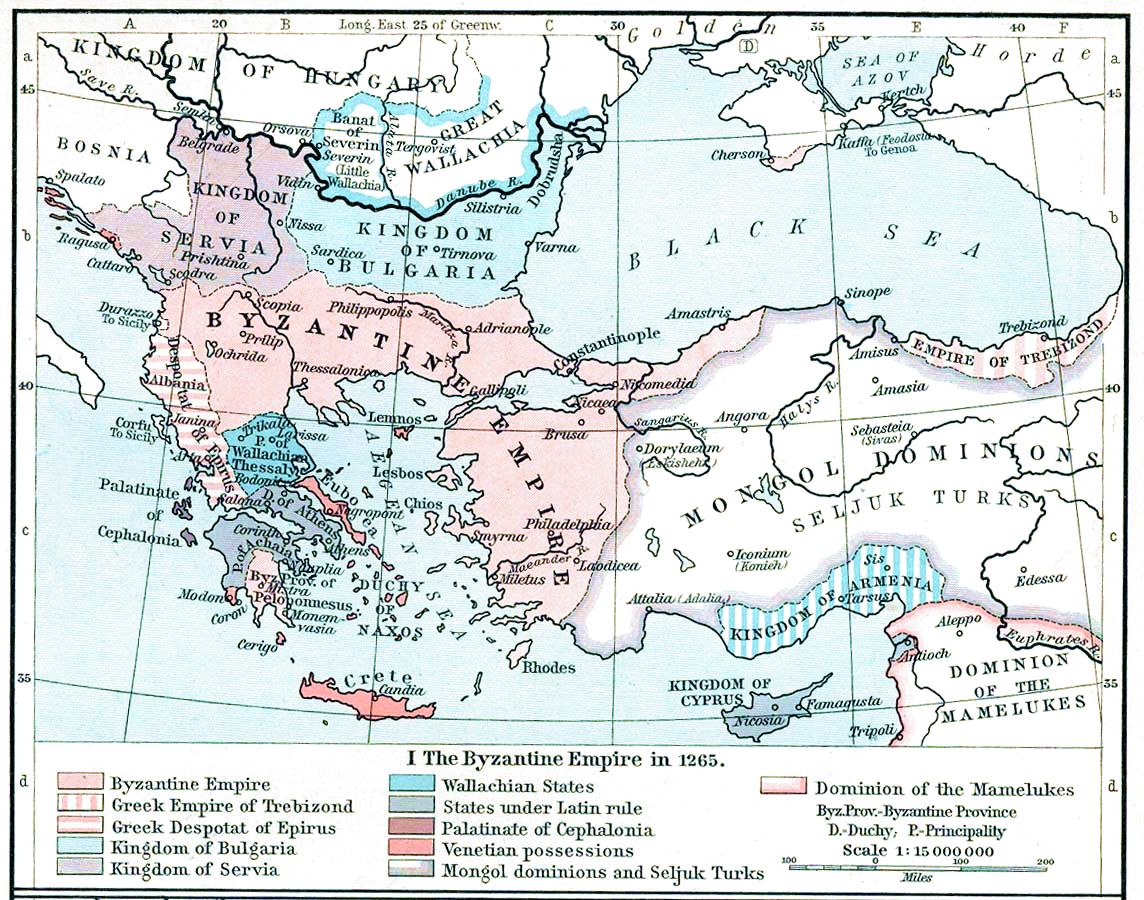
The restored Byzantine Empire at the beginning of Michael VIII Palaiologos' rule (1265)—most European territories had been seized by Theodore's father between 1246 and 1254

Theodore fell seriously ill in November 1257. George Pachymeres, who was less than sixteen years old at the time, would diagnose his illness as epilepsy, mentioning that Theodore had often lost consciousness and "collapsed to the ground". Pachymeres also described Theodore's unusual appointments and his attempts to forge marriage alliances between aristocrats and commoners as symptoms of his disease. Akropolites only noticed extreme weight loss, reducing Theodore's entire body to a skeleton; Blemmydes described Theodore's illness as "a scourge and a strange disease", also mentioning Theodore's melancholy and phobias. Theodore himself wrote of insufferable aching and paralysis in the arms. Modern historians of diseases have not agreed on a diagnosis of Theodore's illness. The medical historian John Lascaratos and the neurologist Panaghiotis Zis maintain that Pachymeres' diagnosis was correct, concluding that Theodore developed epilepsy of the tonic-clonic type in his late twenties. The historian Donald M. Nicol proposes that Theodore's illness "made him the prey of his moods, and he compensated for his nervousness by an autocratic and obstinate temper". The medical historian Georgios Makris concludes in his 1995 study on epilepsy in the Byzantine Empire that Theodore did not have epilepsy. The historian Dimiter Angelov, who does not accept Pachymeres' diagnosis, proposes that Theodore's symptoms—fits and loss of balance—indicate that he had cancer of the brain, the spine, or the lungs.

Theodore's illness prevented him from commanding his troops in person. The commanders of the army in Macedonia, most of them of humble origin, recently appointed by Theodore, could not prevent the Epirotes, Albanians and Serbians from raiding Nicaean territories. Stefan Uroš I defeated the Nicaean troops near Prilep. Michael II's sister-in-law, Maria Petraliphaina, entered into a correspondence with Theodore's commander, Constantine Chabaron, making him believe that she was eager to marry him, but Chabaron was captured during their meeting. Theodore's newly assembled army of Anatolian peasants was routed at Edessa. Michael Palaiologos, who had been allowed to return from his exile, led a new army to Macedonia. He defeated the Epirotes, but Theodore ordered him to return instead of marching to Prilep. Palaiologos' withdrawal enabled Michael II to seize Prilep and capture Akropolites, who was its governor. Michael II was planning to launch an attack against Thessalonica, but Manfred of Sicily renewed his predecessors' claim to Byzantine territories in the Balkans and invaded Epirus from the west. Michael II, who did not want to abandon his plan, concluded an alliance with Manfred who expelled the Nicaean garrisons from Dyrrachium and other fortresses on the Adriatic by the end of February 1258.

Konstantin Tih of Bulgaria repudiated his first wife and sued for the hand of Theodore's eldest daughter, Irene. He knew that his marriage to Irene, who was Tzar Ivan Asen II's granddaughter, could strengthen his claim to rule. Theodore wanted to confirm his peace treaty with Bulgaria and accepted Konstantin Tih's offer. Irene went to Bulgaria to marry Konstantin Tih.

Theodore rarely left his palace at Magnesia during the last months of his life. He was convinced that sorcery caused his illness and accused his courtiers of casting spells on him, sending many of them for trial. Michael Palaiologos's sister, Maria-Martha, was the most famous victim of Theodore's paranoia. Theodore had forced her daughter, Theodora, to marry the elderly Basil Kaballarios, but the marriage was never consummated. After Kaballarios had attributed his impotence to his mother-in-law's spells, Theodore had her put into a sack filled with cats that tore her flesh. She was only released because Theodore suddenly panicked, fearing her spells. Also fearing her brother's revenge, Theodore had Michael Palaiologos imprisoned on charges of poisoning, but soon set him free. The dying emperor named his seven-year-old son, John (r. 1254–1261), as his sole heir, appointing George Mouzalon regent until John came of age. Theodore became a monk, but he kept his baptismal name. He summarized his sins in a treatise and asked the patriarchal synod to grant him absolution. He died in the imperial palace at Magnesia on 16 August 1258. He was buried next to his father in the Sosandra monastery on Mount Sipylus. His grave and the monastery were destroyed after the Turkish conquest of the region in the 14th century.

The aristocrats had taken an oath of loyalty to Mouzalon at Theodore's deathbed, but they soon began conspiring against him. In ten days, Mouzalon was murdered, and Michael Palaiologos assumed the regency for the child-emperor, John IV Laskaris. Palaiologos convinced the aristocrats that an empire ruled by a boy could not resist enemy attacks, and he was proclaimed co-emperor as Michael VIII (r. 1259–1282) before the end of the year. When Michael VIII and John IV were crowned together early in 1259, the Patriarch put the crown first on Michael VIII's head. After concluding an agreement with Genoa against the Latin Empire, he dispatched Alexios Strategopoulos to spy on the defences of Constantinople. Taking advantage of the absence of the bulk of the Latin army, Strategopoulos seized Constantinople by a surprise attack on 25 July 1261. Michael VIII was crowned for the second time, alone, in the Hagia Sophia. The child John IV was blinded on 25 December 1261, which prevented him from ruling. To emphasize that the Laskaris family had lost their imperial status, Michael VIII married off John's three sisters to minor Italian and Bulgarian noblemen.

== Scholarship ==
A man of letters devoted to philosophical and theological studies, Theodore transformed his court into a center for renowned scholars shortly after his accession to the throne. He ordered that books which he and his father had collected in urban libraries be made available to all who wanted to read them. During his father's lifetime he began to write treatises on philosophical, theological and historical subjects, but decided to prepare manuscript editions of his works only after his meeting with Berthold of Hohenburg in 1253. They were collected in four codices, but only three survived.

Theodore's Satire of the Tutor, written most likely in 1240, is his earliest extant work. The satire is dedicated to his principal tutor, portraying him as an under-educated and rude man, who learned magic while staying in Bulgaria. He also wrote encomia in praise of the citizens of Nicaea, his father and Akropolites. Theodore's theological works—including his First Oration against the Latins, or, on the Procession of the Holy Spirit, and his treatise On the Trinity—demonstrate his adherence to Orthodox theology. Theodore's Great Supplicatory Canon to Our Lady, a supplicatory canon to the Virgin Mary, is his best known work. He composed it just months before his death and it is still sung in Orthodox ceremonies.

== Family ==
Neither Theodore nor Elena had reached the minimum legal age of marriage—fourteen for boys and twelve for girls—when they were married, but such an early marriage was not unique among Nicaean aristocrats and commoners. The wedding took place at Lampsakos in early 1235. Years later, Theodore described Elena as the flower of his youth and stated that their "bond of incomparable love" made them "happier than all people". She gave birth to four or five daughters, and one son. Their children were:

- Irene, who married Constantine Tikh of Bulgaria, was Emperor Michael VIII's implacable enemy until her death around 1270.
- Maria, who married Nikephoros I of Epirus, deceased between early in 1257 and 1265.
- Theodora was married off by Michael VIII to a Moreot nobleman, "Maïos Débélikourtos", according to Pachymeres and Nicephorus Gregoras. The historian Albert Failler identifies him as Matthew of Mons who held the Barony of Veligosti in the Principality of Achaea.
- Eudoxia first married Count William-Peter of Ventimiglia, who died around 1280. Her second husband, Roger Arnau, Count of Pallars, died in 1288. The widowed Eudoxia had a love affair with the Aragonese admiral Bernat de Sarrià. She died in 1309.
- A Bulgarian boyar, Despot Jacob Svetoslav, married another of Theodore's daughters, according to Pachymeres. She may have been Theodore's illegitimate daughter, because other Byzantine historians failed to mention her. Pachymeres does not mention her name.
- Theodore's only son, John, survived his mutilation, but he spent the rest of his life in prison. He died around 1309.

Theodore's family and his relationship to Byzantine imperial families

ANGELOI	KOMNENOI	DOUKAI
Alexios I Komnenos *c. 1048 †1118; Byzantine Emperor (r. 1081–1118)	Irene Doukaina *c. 1066 †1138
Constantine Angelos *c. 1093 †before 1185	Theodora
Andronikos Doukas Angelos *c. 1133 †before 1185	Isaac Angelos Doukas
Alexios III Angelos *c. 1153 †1211; Byzantine Emperor (r. 1195–1203)
Alexios Palaiologos †before 1204; Despot	Irene	Anna †before 1213	Theodore I Komnenos Laskaris *c. 1175 †1221; Emperor of Nicaea (r. 1205–1221)	Daughter	Basil Vatatzes †early 1190; Doux
Theodora	Andronikos Palaiologos; Megas domestikos	Irene †1239	John III Doukas Vatatzes; *1192 †1254; Emperor of Nicaea (r. 1221–1254)	Isaac Doukas; Sebastokrator	Son
Maria-Martha	Irene	Michael VIII Palaiologos; *1223 †1282; Byzantine Emperor (r. 1261–1282)	Elena of Bulgaria; *1223 †1252	Theodore II Doukas Laskaris; *1221/22 †1258; Emperor of Nicaea (r. 1254–1258)	John Doukas	Daughter	Alexios Raoul †c. 1258; Protovestiarios
Basil Kaballarios	Theodora	George Mouzalon †1258; Regent for John IV Laskaris	Theodora	Theodora *c. 1240 †1303	Andronikos Mouzalon †1258; Megas domesticos	Daughter
PALAIOLOGOI
Konstantin Tih †1277; Tzar of Bulgaria (r. 1257–1277)	Irene †1270	Nikephoros I *c. 1240 †c. 1297; Ruler of Epirus (r. 1266/68 – c. 1297)	Maria †before 1268	Matthew of Mons; Baron of Veligosti	Theodora	William-Peter †c. 1280; Count of Ventimiglia	Eudoxia †1309	Roger Arnau †1288; Count of Pallars	Jacob Svetoslav †1275/77; Despot in Bulgaria	Daughter	John IV Laskaris; *1250 †c. 1209; Emperor of Nicaea (r. 1258–1261)
Counts Lascaris di Ventimiglia

== Sources ==
- Angelov, Dimiter (2019). The Byzantine Hellene: The Life of Emperor Theodore Laskaris and Byzantium in the Thirteenth Century. Cambridge University Press. ISBN 978-1-108-48071-0.
- Angold, Michael (1991). "Theodore II Laskaris". In Kazhdan, Alexander P.; Talbot, Alice-Mary; Cutler, Anthony; Gregory, Timothy E.; Ševčenko, Nancy P. (eds.). The Oxford Dictionary of Byzantium. Vol. 3. Oxford University Press. pp. 2040–2041. ISBN 978-0-1998-9065-1.
- Angold, Michael (2017) [2008]. "After the Fourth Crusade: the Greek Rump States and the Recovery of Byzantium". In Shepard, Jonathan (ed.). The Cambridge History of the Byzantine Empire, c. 500–1492. Cambridge University Press. pp. 731–758. ISBN 978-0-521-83231-1.
- Failler, Albert (1980). "Chronologie et composition dans l'Histoire de Georges Pachymère" [Chronology and Composition in George Pachymeres' History]. Revue des Études Byzantines (in French). 38. Institut français d'études byzantines: 5–103. ISSN 0771-3347.
- Fine, John V. A. (2009) [1994]. The Late Medieval Balkans: A Critical Survey from the Late Twelfth Century to the Ottoman Conquest. The University of Michigan Press. ISBN 978-0-472-08260-5.
- Kanellopoulos, Nicholas S.; Lekea, Joanne K. (2007). "The Struggle between the Nicean Empire and the Bulgarian State (1254–1256): Towards a Revival of Byzantine Military Tactics under Theodore II Lascaris". In Rogers, Clifford J.; DeVries, Kelly; France, John (eds.). The Journal of Medieval Military History. Vol. V. The Boydell Press. pp. 56–69. ISBN 978-1-84383-339-0.
- Korobeinikov, D. A. (2017) [2008]. "Raiders and Neighbours: The Turks (1040–1304)". In Shepard, Jonathan (ed.). The Cambridge History of the Byzantine Empire, c. 500–1492. Cambridge University Press. pp. 692–727. ISBN 978-0-521-83231-1.
- Lascaratos, John; Zis, Panaghiotis Vassilios (1998). "The Epilepsy of the Emperor Theodore II Lascaris (1254–1258)". Journal of Epilepsy. 11 (6). Butterworth-Heinemann: 296–300. doi:10.1016/S0896-6974(98)00032-2. ISSN 0896-6974.
- Nicol, Donald M. (1993) [1972]. The Last Centuries of Byzantium, 1261–1453. Cambridge University Press. ISBN 978-0-521-43991-6.
- Treadgold, Warren (1997). A History of the Byzantine State and Society. Stanford University Press. ISBN 978-0-8047-2630-6.

Theodore II Laskaris Laskarid dynasty Born: unknown 1221 Died: 16 August 1258
Regnal titles
Preceded by John III Doukas Vatatzes	Emperor of Nicaea; 1254–1258	Succeeded by John IV Doukas Laskaris
