= Eastern Orthodox teaching regarding the Filioque =

The position of the Eastern Orthodox Church regarding the Filioque controversy is defined by their interpretation of the Bible, and the teachings of the Church Fathers, creeds and definitions of the seven Ecumenical Councils, as well as the decisions of several particular councils of the Eastern Orthodox Church.

William La Due describes modern Eastern Orthodox theological scholarship as split between a group of scholars that hold to a "strict traditionalism going back to Photius" and other scholars that are "not so adamantly opposed (to the filioque)". Vladimir Lossky asserted that any notion of a double procession of the Holy Spirit from both the Father and the Son was incompatible with Orthodox theology. Orthodox scholars who share Lossky's view include Dumitru Stăniloae, John Romanides and Michael Pomazansky. Sergius Bulgakov, however, was of the opinion that the Filioque did not represent an insurmountable obstacle to reunion of the Eastern Orthodox and Roman Catholic churches.

The Eastern Orthodox interpretation of the Trinity is that the Holy Spirit originates, has his cause for existence or being (manner of existence) from the Father alone as "One God, One Father" and that the filioque confuses the theology as it was defined at the councils at both Nicaea and Constantinople. The position that having the creed say "the Holy Spirit which proceeds from the Father and the Son", does not mean that the Holy Spirit now has two origins, is the position the West took at the Council of Florence, as the Council declared the Holy Spirit "has His essence and His subsistent being from the Father together with the Son, and proceeds from both eternally as from one principle and a single spiration.

== Views of Eastern Orthodox saints ==
The addition of the Filioque to the Niceno-Constantinopolitan Creed has been condemned as heretical by many important Fathers and saints of the Eastern Orthodox Church, including Photios I of Constantinople, Gregory Palamas and Mark of Ephesus, sometimes referred to as the Three Pillars of Orthodoxy. However, the statement 'The Holy Spirit proceeds from the Father and the Son' can be understood in an Orthodox sense if it is clear from the context that 'procession from the Son' refers to the sending forth of the Spirit in time, not to an eternal, double procession within the Trinity Itself. Hence, Maximus the Confessor defended the Western use of the Filioque in a context other than that of the Niceno-Constantinipolitan Creed (Note: Maximus the Confessor, "desiring to defend the Westerners, justified them precisely by saying that by the words 'from the Son' they intended to indicate that the Holy Spirit is given to creatures through the Son, that He is manifested, that He is sent — but not that the Holy Spirit has His existence from Him.") and "defended the Filioque as a legitimate variation of the Eastern formula that the Spirit proceeds from the Father through the Son" (Concordia Theological Quarterly, January-April 1995, p. 32, and cf. p. 40).

Concerning the Holy Spirit, it is said not that he has existence from the Son or through the Son, but rather that He proceeds from the Father and has the same nature as the Son, is in fact the Spirit of the Son as being One in Essence with Him.

Hierotheos Vlachos, metropolitan of Nafpaktos, wrote that according to Eastern Orthodox tradition, Gregory of Nyssa composed the section about the Holy Spirit in the Second Ecumenical Council's Niceno-Constantinopolitan Creed of 381. Siecienski doubted that Gregory of Nyssa "would have accepted the filioque as it was later understood in the West, although he witnesses to the important truth (often ignored in the East) that there is an eternal, and not simply economic, relationship of the Spirit to the Son."

== Eastern Orthodox theology ==
In Eastern Orthodoxy, theology starts with the Father hypostasis, not the essence of God, since the Father is the God of the Old Testament. The Father is the origin of all things and this is the basis and starting point of the Orthodox trinitarian teaching of one God in Father, one God, of the essence of the Father (as the uncreated comes from the Father as this is what the Father is). In Eastern Orthodox theology, God's uncreatedness or being or essence in Greek is called ousia. Jesus Christ is the Son (God Man) of the uncreated Father (God). The Holy Spirit is the Spirit of the uncreated Father (God).

The activity and actuality of the Trinity in creation are called God's energies as God as creator is light and this uncreated light (energy) is the basis from which all things derive their existence. God has existences (hypostases) of being; this concept is translated as the word "person" in the West. Each hypostasis of God is a specific and unique existence of God. Each has the same essence (coming from the origin, without origin, Father (God) they are uncreated). Each specific quality that constitutes a hypostasis of God, is non-reductionist and not shared.

It is this immanence of the Trinity that was defined in the finalized Nicene Creed. The economy of God, as God expresses himself in reality (his energies) was not what the Creed addressed directly. Nor the specifics of God's interrelationships of his existences, is again not what is defined within the Nicene Creed. The attempt to use the Creed to explain God's energies by reducing God existences to mere energies (actualities, activities, potentials) could be perceived as the heresy of semi-modalism. Eastern Orthodox theologians have complained about this problem in the Roman Catholic dogmatic teaching of actus purus.

=== Theodoret's statement against Cyril ===
Theodoret, bishop of Cyrrhus in the Roman province of Euphratensis, refused to endorse the 431 deposition of Nestorius, archbishop of Constantinople, by the First Council of Ephesus. Theodoret accused Cyril of Alexandria of erroneously teaching that the Son has a role in the origin of the Holy Spirit. In fact, several statements by Cyril exist in which he fleetingly declares that the Holy Spirit issues from the Father and the Son (with similar statements that the Spirit issues from the Father through the Son) in an intra-Trinitarian relationship. Antony Maas wrote that what Theodoret denied was not the eternal procession of the Holy Spirit from the Father and the Son, but only the claim that the Holy Spirit was created by or through the Son. Photius's position that the Holy Spirit proceeds from the Father alone has been described as a restatement of Theodoret's. In spite of Theodoret's attack on him for saying "the Spirit has his existence either from the Son or through the Son", Cyril continued to use such formulae.

Under persistent urging by the Fathers of the Council of Chalcedon (451), Theodoret finally pronounced an anathema on Nestorius. (Note: In 451, Theodoret "was partially vindicated" by the Council of Chalcedon which acknowledged Theodoret's "orthodoxy on condition that he pronounce" Cyril's anathemas from 431 against Nestorius, "in effect repudiating his own [...] accusations of Apollinarianism against Cyril.") He died in 457. Almost exactly one hundred years later, the Fifth Ecumenical Council (553) declared anathema anyone who would defend the writings of Theodoret against Saint Cyril and his Twelve Anathemas, the ninth of which Theodoret had attacked for what it said of the procession of the Holy Spirit. (See Three-Chapter Controversy). Theodoret is a saint in Eastern Orthodoxy, but he is called the excommunicated in Occidental Orthodoxy and the Roman Church. Cyril spoke of the matter of which Theodoret accused him as a misunderstanding. According to Joseph Farrell Cyril taught that the Latin teaching of the procession of the Holy Spirit from the Father and the Son appears to confuse the three hypostases of God with the common attributes of each hypostasis, and to the God's energetic manifestation in the world. (Note: Joseph Farrell wrote that "it may be that" Cyril "understand the procession of the Holy Spirit in the filioquist sense," but in Farrell's opinion, Cyril "could have intended to denote the sending of the Spirit in the economy. This would seem to correspond better with" what Cyril wrote to John of Antioch – that the Latin contention "was reasonably considered by the Orthodox as leading to the confusion of the three hypostatic persons with the common attributes of each person, and to their manifestations and relations with the world." Farrell wrote that controversy between Cyril and Theodoret "should not be dismissed too lightly.")

=== John Damascus ===
Before Photius, St John of Damascus wrote explicitly of the relationship of the Holy Spirit to the Father and Son.

Of the Holy Ghost, we both say that He is from the Father, and call Him the Spirit of the Father; while we nowise say that He is from the Son, but only call Him the Spirit of the Son. (Theol., lib. l.c. 11, v. 4.)

John of Damascus' position stated that the procession of the Holy Spirit is from the Father alone, but through the Son as mediator, in this way differing from Photius. John of Damascus along with Photius, never endorsed the Filioque in the Creed.

=== Photius and the Monarchy of the Father ===
Photius insisted on the expression "from the Father" and excluded "through the Son" (Christ as co-cause of the Holy Spirit rather than primary cause) with regard to the eternal procession of the Holy Spirit : "through the Son" applied only to the temporal mission of the Holy Spirit (the sending in time). Photius addresses in his entire work on the Filioque the Mystagogy of the Holy Spirit. That any addition to the Creed would be to complicate and confuse an already very clear and simple definition of the ontology of the Holy Spirit that the Ecumenical Councils already gave.

Photius' position has been called a reaffirmation of Orthodox doctrine of the Monarchy of the Father. Photius's position that the Holy Spirit proceeds from the Father alone has also been described as a restatement of the Cappadocian Antiochian school (as opposed to the Alexandrian) teaching of the "monarchy of the Father".

Of the Eastern Orthodox's teaching ("from the Father alone"), Vladimir Lossky says that, while "verbally it may seem novel", it expresses in its doctrinal tenor the traditional teaching which is considered Orthodox. The phrase "from the Father alone" arises from the fact that the Creed itself only has "from the Father". So that the word "alone", which Photius nor the Orthodox suggest be added to the Creed, has been called a "gloss on the Creed", a clarification, an explanation or interpretation of its meaning.

Photius as well as the Eastern Orthodox, have never seen the need, nor ever suggested the word "alone" be added to the Creed itself. With this, the Eastern Orthodox Church generally considers the added Filioque phrase "from the Father and the Son" to be heretical, (Note: "Such are some of the reasons why Orthodox regard the filioque as dangerous and heretical. Filioquism confuses the persons, and destroys the proper balance between unity and diversity in the Godhead. ... Such in outline is the Orthodox attitude to the filioque, although not all would state the case in such an uncompromising form" (Bishop Kallistos Ware, The Orthodox Church (extracts).) and accordingly procession "from the Father alone" has been referred to as "a main dogma of the Greek Church". Avery Dulles does not go so far and only states that the procession of the Spirit from the Father alone was the formula preferred by Photius and his strict disciples.

Eastern Orthodox theologians maintain that by the expression "from the Father alone", and Photius' opposition to the Filioque, Photius was confirming what is Orthodox and consistent with church tradition. They draw the teaching of the Father as cause alone (their interpretation of the Monarchy of the Father) from such expressions from various saints and biblical text. Such as that of Saint Irenaeus, when he called the Word and the Spirit "the two hands of God". (Note: Nevertheless, the overall Eastern tradition, because it stresses the Scriptural and pre-Nicene teaching of the Monarchy of the Father, prefers St. Irenaeus' pyramid vision of the Word and Spirit as "the two hands of God".) They interpret the phrase "monarchy of the Father" differently from those who see it as not in conflict with a procession of the Holy Spirit from the Father through or from the Son. As the Father has given to the Son everything that belongs to the Father, except being Father (see examples given above of those who in this way uphold the monarchy of the Father).

By insistence of the Filioque, Orthodox representatives say that the West appears to deny the monarchy of Father and the Father as principle origin of the Trinity. Which would indeed be the heresy of Modalism (which states the essence of God and not the Father is the origin of, the Father, Son and Holy Spirit). The idea of Photius having invented that the Father is sole source of cause of the Holy Trinity is to attribute to him something that predates Photius' existence i.e.Athanasius, Gregory Nazianzen, John Chrysostom, Theodore of Mopsuestia, Theodoret of Cyrus and John of Damascus. (Note: The authority of the Nicene Creed, and the Greek fathers, especially Athanasius, Gregory Nazianzen, Chrysostom, Theodore of Mopsuestia, Theodoret of Cyrus, and John of Damascus. The Antiochean school is clearly on the Greek side; but the Alexandrian school leaned to the formula through the Son (dia tou Hiou, per Filium). The Greeks claim all the Greek fathers, and regard Augustin as the inventor of the Latin dogma of the double procession.) "Photius never explored the deeper meaning behind the formula 'through the Son' (διὰ τοῦ Υἱοῦ), or the necessary eternal relationship between the Son and the Spirit, even though it was a traditional teaching of the previous Greek fathers," according to Siecienski.

Photius did recognize that the Spirit maybe said to proceed temporally through the Son or from the Son. (Note: Photios' position that, "the Spirit proceeds from the Father alone," intends not to deny the intimate relations between the generation of the Son and the procession of the Spirit. It is only to make utterly explicit that the Father alone causes the existence of both the Son and the Spirit. Conferring upon them all his attributes, and powers, except his hypostatic property, i.e., that he is the Father, the unbegotten, the source, origin, and cause of divinity.) Photius stated that this was not the eternal Trinitarian relationships that was actually the thing being defined in the Creed. The Nicene Creed in Greek, speaks of the procession of the Holy Spirit "from the Father", not "from the Father alone", nor "From the Father and the Son", nor "From the Father through the Son".

Photius taught this in light of the teachings from Saints like Irenaeus whose Monarchy of the Father is in contrast to subordinationism, as the Orthodox officially condemned subordinationism in the 2nd council of Constantinople. That the Monarchy of Father which is in the Nicene Creed, Photius (and the Eastern Orthodox) endorse as official doctrine. (Note: Under the heading of the Roman Catholic teaching of the filioque Evangelical Lutheran Church in America and of the Standing Conference of Canonical Orthodox Bishops in the Americas approved "A Lutheran-Orthodox Common Statement on Faith in the Holy Trinity. 1998. The Orthodox do not regard the teaching that the Holy Spirit proceeds from the Son as well as from the Father to be one which they can accept. This teaching is opposed to the monarchy of the Father and to the equality of the Spirit to the Father and the Son as a hypostasis or person distinct from both, as expressed by the original Creed. ... That the Holy Spirit eternally comes forth from the Son, so as to depend for his being and his possession of the one divine nature on the Son as well as on the Father, is a teaching which Orthodox uniformly oppose. This would seem to be an expression of what Ware calls the rigorist position within the Orthodox Church. As well as John of Damascus who taught the Holy Spirit proceeds from the being of God (as does Zizilious). Which is the Father expressed in the concept of the "monarchy of the Father" via John 14:28 ("The Father is greater than I am").)

== Eastern Orthodox view of Roman Catholic theology ==
Eastern Orthodox theologians (e.g., Pomazansky) say that the Nicene Creed as a Symbol of Faith, as dogma, is to address and define church theology specifically the Orthodox Trinitarian understanding of God. In the hypostases of God as correctly expressed against the teachings considered outside the church. The Father hypostasis of the Nicene Creed is the origin of all. (Note: In the Byzantine period, the Orthodox side accused the Latin-speaking Christians, who supported the Filioque, of introducing two Gods, precisely because they believed that the Filioque implied two causes — not simply two sources or principles — in the Holy Trinity. The Greek Patristic tradition, at least since the Cappadocian Fathers identified God with the person of the Father, whereas, St. Augustine seems to identify him with the one divine substance (the deitas or divinitas)) Eastern Orthodox theologians have stated that New Testament passages (often quoted by the Latins) speak of the economy rather than the ontology of the Holy Spirit, and that in order to resolve this conflict Western theologians made further doctrinal changes, including declaring all persons of the Trinity to originate in the essence of God (the heresy of Sabellianism). Eastern Orthodox theologians see this as teaching of philosophical speculation rather than from actual experience of God via theoria.

The Father is the eternal, infinite and uncreated reality, that the Christ and the Holy Spirit are also eternal, infinite and uncreated, in that their origin is not in the ousia of God, but that their origin is in the hypostasis of God called the Father. The double procession of the Holy Spirit bears some resemblance (Note: Photius states in section 32 "And Again, if the Spirit proceeds from the Father, and the Son likewise is begotten of the Father, then it is in precisely this fact that the Father's personal property is discerned. But if the Son is begotten and the Spirit proceed from the Son (as this delirium of theirs would have it) then the Spirit of the Father is distinguished by more personal properties than the Son of the Father: on the one hand as proceeding from the equality of the Son and the Spirit, the Spirit is further differentiated by the two distinctions brought about by the dual procession, then the Spirit is not only differentiated by more distinctions than the Son of the Father, but the Son is closer to the Father's essence. And this is so precisely because the Spirit is distinguished by two specific properties. Therefore He is inferior to the Son, Who in turn is of the same nature as the Father! Thus the Spirit's equal dignity is blasphemed, once again giving rise to the Macedonian insanity against the Spirit." to the teachings of Macedonius I of Constantinople and his sect called the Pneumatomachians in that the Holy Spirit is created by the Son and a servant of the Father and the Son. It was Macedonius' position that caused the specific wording of the section on the Holy Spirit by St Gregory of Nyssa in the finalized Nicene Creed.) (Note: "However, the chief of the heretics who distorted the apostolic teaching concerning the Holy Spirit was" Macedonius I of Constantinople, in the 4th century, who found followers "among former Arians and Semi-Arians. He called the Holy Spirit a creation of the Son, and a servant of the Father and the Son. Accusers of his heresy were" Church Fathers like Basil of Caesarea, Gregory of Nazianzus, Athanasius of Alexandria, Gregory of Nyssa, Ambrose, Amphilochius of Iconium, Diodorus of Tarsus, "and others, who wrote works against the heretics. The false teaching of Macedonius was refuted first in a series of local councils and finally at" Constantinople I. "In preserving Orthodoxy," Nicaea I completed the Nicaean Symbol of Faith "with these words: 'And in the Holy Spirit, the Lord, the Giver of Life, Who proceedeth from the Father, Who with the Father and the Son is equally worshiped and glorified, Who spake by the Prophets,' as well as those articles of the Creed which follow this in the Nicaean-Constantinopolitan Symbol of Faith.")

The following are some Roman Catholic dogmatic declarations of the Filioque which are in contention with Eastern Orthodoxy:

1. The Fourth Council of the Lateran (1215): "The Father is from no one, the Son from the Father only, and the Holy Spirit equally from both."
2. The Second Council of Lyon, session 2 (1274): "[...] the Holy Spirit proceeds eternally from Father and Son, not as from two principles, but as from one, not by two spirations, but by one only."
3. The Council of Florence, session 6 in Laetentur Caeli (1439), on union with the Greeks: "We declare that when holy Doctors and Fathers say that the Holy Spirit proceeds from the Father through the Son, this tends toward that understanding which signifies that the Son, like the Father, is also what the Greeks call 'cause' and the Latins 'principle' of the subsistence of the Holy Spirit.
  And since the Father himself has given to his only begotten Son, in generating him, all that the Father has except being the Father, the Son himself eternally has from the Father, from whom he is eternally generated, precisely this: that the Holy Spirit proceeds from the Son." (Note: For another translation, see "Eccumenical Council of Florence and Council of Basel". Ewtn.com.)
4. The Council of Florence, session 8 in (1439), on : "The Holy Spirit is eternally from Father and Son; He has his nature and subsistence at once (simul) from the Father and the Son. He proceeds eternally from both as from one principle and through one spiration. ... And, since the Father has through generation given to the only-begotten Son everything that belongs to the Father, except being Father, the Son has also eternally from the Father, from whom he is eternally born, that the Holy Spirit proceeds from the Son."
5. The Council of Florence, session 11 (1442), in Cantate Domino, on union with the Copts and Ethiopians: "Father, Son and holy Spirit; one in essence, three in persons; unbegotten Father, Son begotten from the Father, holy Spirit proceeding from the Father and the Son; [...] the holy Spirit alone proceeds at once from the Father and the Son. [...] Whatever the holy Spirit is or has, he has from the Father together with the Son. But the Father and the Son are not two principles of the holy Spirit, but one principle, just as the Father and the Son and the holy Spirit are not three principles of creation but one principle."
6. In particular the condemnation, made at the Second Council of Lyons, session 2 (1274), of those "who [...] deny that the Holy Spirit proceeds eternally from the Father and the Son or who [...] assert that the Holy Spirit proceeds from the Father and the Son as from two principles, not from one."

In the judgment of these Orthodox, the Roman Catholic Church is in fact teaching as a matter of Roman Catholic dogma that the Holy Spirit derives his origin and being (equally) from both the Father and the Son, making the Filioque a double procession. (Note: Lossky wrote: "If the Holy Spirit proceeds from the Father alone, as the hypostatic cause of the consubstantial hypostases, we find the 'simple Trinity,' where the monarchy of the Father conditions the personal diversity of the Three while at the same time expressing their essential unity.") This being the very thing that Maximus the Confessor was stating in his work from the 7th century that would be wrong and that the West was not doing.

Some Eastern Orthodox theologians perceive the West as teaching through more than one type of theological Filioque a different origin and cause of the Holy Spirit. That through the dogmatic Roman Catholic Filioque the Holy Spirit is subordinate to the Father and the Son and not a free and independent and equal to the Father, hypostasis that receives his uncreatedness from the origin of all things, the Father hypostasis. Trinity expresses the idea of message, messenger and revealer, or mind, word and meaning. Eastern Orthodox Christians believe in one God the Father, whose person is uncaused and unoriginate, who, because He is love and communion, always exists with His Word and Spirit. (Note: In the Byzantine period the Orthodox side accused the Latin speaking Christians, who supported the Filioque, of introducing two Gods, precisely because they believed that the Filioque implied two causes—not simply two sources or principles—in the Holy Trinity. The Greek Patristic tradition, at least since the Cappadocian Fathers identified God with the person of the Father, whereas, Augustine seems to identify him with the one divine substance (the deitas or divinitas).) (Note: Gregory Palamas asserted, in 1351, "that the Holy Spirit 'has the Father as foundation, source, and cause,' but 'reposes in the Son' and 'is sent – that is, manifested – through the Son.' (ibid. 194) In terms of the transcendent divine energy, although not in terms of substance or hypostatic being, 'the Spirit pours itself out from the Father through the Son, and, if you like, from the Son over all those worthy of it,' a communication which may even be broadly called 'procession' (ekporeusis).")

=== Gregory Palamas' Tomus of 1351 ===
In St Gregory of Palamas' Tomus (1351) on the issue of the Filioque he very clearly denotes the distinctions of the Eastern and Western churches positions on the procession of the Holy Spirit here St Gregory was not only following the Eastern Tradition of what was addressed in the Nicene Creed by the Greek Fathers but he also clarifies what the divergent phrases of those in the East who appear to support the Filioque and what distinction is actually being made by the Eastern fathers who oppose the use of Filioque.

"The Great Maximus, the holy Tarasius, and even the saintly John [Damascene] recognize that the Holy Spirit proceeds from the Father, from whom it subsists in terms of its hypostasis and the cause of its being. At the same time, they acknowledge that the Spirit is given, revealed, and, manifeste, comes forth, and is known through the Son."

=== Orthodox theologians who do not condemn the Filioque ===
Not all Orthodox theologians share the opinion of Lossky, Stăniloae, Romanides, and Pomazansky, who condemn the Filioque. There is a liberal view within the Orthodox tradition which is more accepting of the Filioque. (Note: "A Lutheran-Orthodox Common Statement on Faith in the Holy Trinity," paragraph 11. This would seem to be an expression of what Kallistos Ware calls the "rigorist" position within the Orthodox Church. ("Christian Theology in the East," in A History of Christian Doctrine, edited by Hubert Cunliffe-Jones [Philadelphia: Fortress Press, 1980], p. 209.) Ware maintains that a more "liberal" position on this issue is "also held by many Orthodox at the present time." He writes that "According to the 'liberal' view, the Greek and the Latin doctrines on the procession of the Holy Spirit may both alike be regarded as theologically defensible. The Greeks affirm that the Spirit proceeds from the Father through the Son, the Latins that He proceeds from the Father and from the Son; but when applied to the relationship between Son and Spirit, these two prepositions 'through' and 'from' amount to the same thing." (Ware, p. 208)) The Encyclopedia of Christian Theology mentions that Vasily Bolotov, Paul Evdokimov, I. Voronov and Bulgakov classify the Filioque as a Theologoumenon – a permissible theological opinion. (Note: A theologoumenon is a theological opinion in a debate where both sides are rigorously orthodox.) Since a theologoumenon is a theological opinion on what is defined outside of dogma, in the case of any Orthodox theologians open to the filioque as opinion, it is unclear if they would accept that the filioque ever be added into the Creed for the whole church, or just something exclusive for the Latin language based church of the West. (Note: Similarly the Anglican consideration to remove the filioque from the Creed but at the same time to continue to affirm its theological value as a complementary Western understanding of the Holy Trinity. Allchin reports the official proposal to the Anglican Church by the Anglican membership of the Anglican-Orthodox Doctrinal Commission. He himself seems critical of the implications of the filioque. See pp. 95-96. while welcome, essentially depends on whether or not the filioque is at least consistent with dogmatic truth as officially promulgated by the ecumenical synods. Neither the filioque formula nor the interpretations in support of it or against it can be regarded as theologoumena, as some would have it, unless they can be clearly shown at least not to be opposed to early Christian doctrine and the Nicene Creed. Theologoumena cannot contradict promulgated dogmatic truth for otherwise, as Stăniloae observes, "it would be impossible to tell the difference between a theologoumenon and an error.") For Vasily Bolotov this is confirmed by other sources, even if they do not themselves adopt that opinion. Though Bolotov firmly rejects the Filioque in the procession of the Spirit from the Father.

Bulgakov wrote, in The Comforter, that:

the divergence expressed by the two traditions, Filioque and dia ton Huiou, is not a heresy or even a dogmatic error. It is a difference of theological opinions which was dogmatized prematurely and erroneously. There is no dogma of the relation of the Holy Spirit to the Son, and therefore particular opinions on this subject are not heresies but merely dogmatic hypotheses, which have been transformed into heresies by the schismatic spirit that has established itself in the Church and that eagerly exploits all sorts of liturgical and even cultural differences.

As an Orthodox theologian, Bulgakov acknowledged that dogma can only established by an ecumenical council.

Boris Bobrinskoy sees the Filioque as having positive theological content. Ware suggests that the problem is of semantics rather than of basic doctrinal differences. Saint Theophylact of Ohrid likewise held that the difference was linguistic in nature and not actually theological.

== Sources ==
- Bulgakov, Sergei (2004). "The procession of the Holy Spirit". The Comforter. Translated by Jakim, Boris. Grand Rapids, MI: William B. Eerdmans. ISBN 978-0-8028-2112-6.
- Cleenewerck, Laurent (2007). His broken body: understanding and healing the schism between the Roman Catholic and Eastern Orthodox Churches. Euclid University Press. pp. 321–347. ISBN 978-0-615-18361-9.
- Del Cole, Ralph (Spring 1997). "Reflections on the Filioque". Journal of Ecumenical Studies. 34 (2). Philadelphia, PA: Temple University. ISSN 0022-0558. Archived from the original on 2015-10-12 – via Questia. Previously accessed via "Reflections on the Filioque". Vol. 34, no. 2.
- Cunliffe-Jones, Hubert (2006). A History of Christian Doctrine. Continuum International Publishing Group. ISBN 978-0-567-04393-1.
  - Ware, Kallistos. "Christian theology in the East 600–1453". In Cunliffe-Jones (2006).
- Denzinger, Heinrich; Hünermann, Peter; et al., eds. (2012). "Compendium of Creeds, Definitions, and Declarations on Matters of Faith and Morals". Enchiridion symbolorum: a compendium of creeds, definitions and declarations of the Catholic Church (43rd ed.). San Francisco: Ignatius Press. ISBN 978-0898707465.
- Dulles, Avery (April 1995). "The Filioque: what is at stake?". Concordia Theological Quarterly. 59 (1–2). Fort Wayne, IN: Faculty of Concordia Theological Seminary: 31–47, at 32, 40. ISSN 0038-8610. Archived from the original on 2004-10-21.
- Farrelly, John (2005). "Later soundings: the fifth to the nineteenth century". The Trinity: rediscovering the central Christian mystery. Lanham [u.a.]: Rowman & Littlefield. ISBN 978-0-916586-88-1.
- Hopko, Thomas (n.d.). Doctrine. The Orthodox faith. Vol. 1. Orthodox Christian Publication Center / Orthodox Church of America. Archived from the original on 2015-02-21 – via oca.org.
- Kulakov, Mikhail (2007). "Vladimir Nikolaievich Lossky (1903-1958) – Commentary". In Witte, John; Alexander, Frank S. (eds.). The teachings of modern Orthodox Christianity on law, politics, and human nature. New York [u.a.]: Columbia University Press. ISBN 978-0-231-14265-6.
- Lossky, Vladimir (1997) [1957]. Mystical theology of the Eastern Church. Translated by members of the Fellowship of St. Alban and St. Sergius. Cambridge, UK: James Clarke. pp. 48–57. ISBN 978-0-22767919-7.
- Lossky, Vladimir (2003) [1974]. "The procession of the Holy Spirit in Orthodox Trinitarian theology". In Clendenin, Daniel B. (ed.). Eastern Orthodox theology: a contemporary reader (2nd ed.). Grand Rapids, MI: Baker Academic. ISBN 978-0-8010-2651-5. Chapter was first published in Lossky, Vladimir (1974). In the image and likeness of God. Translated by Erickson, John H.; Bird, Thomas E. Crestwood, NY: St. Vladimir's Seminary Press. pp. 71–96. ISBN 9780913836132.
- McGuckin, John A., ed. (2011). "The Encyclopedia of Eastern Orthodox Christianity: N-Z". The encyclopedia of Eastern Orthodox Christianity. Blackwell Publishing. ISBN 9781405185394 – via Blackwell Reference Online.
  - Papanikolaou, Aristotle. "Holy Trinity". In McGuckin (2011).
- Meyendorff, John (1974). St. Gregory Palamas and orthodox spirituality. Crestwood, N.Y.: St. Vladimir's Seminary Press. ISBN 978-0-913-83611-8.
- Moltmann, Jürgen (1993) [©1981]. The Trinity and the kingdom: the doctrine of God. Translated by Margaret Kohl (reprint ed.). Minneapolis, MN: Fortress Press. ISBN 978-0-8006-2825-3.
- North American Orthodox-Catholic Theological Consultation (2003-10-25). "The Filioque: a Church dividing issue?". usccb.org. Washington, DC: United States Conference of Catholic Bishops. Archived from the original on 2015-11-17. Also archived as from scoba.us. New York: Standing Conference of Canonical Orthodox Bishops in the Americas.
- Papadakis, Aristeides (1997) [1983]. Crisis in Byzantium: The Filioque Controversy in the Patriarchate of Gregory II of Cyprus (1283-1289) (Rev. ed.). Crestwood, NY: St. Vladimir's Seminary Press. ISBN 9780881411768.
- Pomazansky, Michael (1984). Rose, Seraphim (ed.). Orthodox dogmatic theology: a concise exposition. Translated by Rose, Seraphim (IntraText CT ed.). Rome: Èulogos SpA (published 2007-05-04). OCLC 13126159 – via intratext.com.
- Pontifical Council for Promoting Christian Unity (1995-09-13). "The Greek and Latin traditions regarding the procession of the Holy Spirit". L'Osservatore Romano. No. 38 (English weekly ed.). Vatican City (published 1995-09-20). pp. 3, 6. ISSN 1563-6178. via: "The Greek and Latin traditions regarding the procession of the Holy Spirit" (PDF). Information Service (83). Vatican City: Pontifical Council for Promoting Christian Unity: 88–92. 1995. OCLC 826628354. Archived (PDF) from the original on 2015-12-23
- Schmaus, Michael (1975). "Holy Spirit". In Rahner, Karl (ed.). Encyclopedia of theology: the concise Sacramentum mundi. New York: Crossroad. pp. 646–647. ISBN 9780816411825.
- Siecienski, Anthony Edward (2010). The Filioque: History of a Doctrinal Controversy. Oxford: Oxford University Press. ISBN 9780195372045.
- Stylianopoulous, Theodore (1984). "The Filioque: dogma, theologoumenon or error?". In Stylianopoulos, Theodore G; Heim, S. Mark (eds.). Spirit of truth: ecumenical perspectives on the Holy Spirit. Holy Spirit Consultation, October 24–25, 1985, Brookline, Massachusetts. Brookline, MA: Holy Cross Orthodox Press (published 1986). ISBN 978-0-91765139-7. – also archived from goecities.com transcription of "The Filioque: dogma, theologoumenon or error?". The Greek Orthodox Theological Review. 31 (3–4). Brookline, MA: Greek Orthodox Theological Institute Press: 255–288. 1986. ISSN 2169-6861.
- Vischer, Lukas, ed. (1981). Spirit of God, Spirit of Christ: ecumenical reflections on the Filioque controversy. Faith and order paper. Vol. 103. Geneva: World Council of Churches. ISBN 9780281038206.
- Allchin, Donald M. "Filioque clause: an Anglican approach". In Vischer (1981).
- Stăniloae, Dumitru. "The procession of the Holy Spirit from the Father and His relation to the Son, as the basis of our deification and adoption". In Vischer (1981), pp. 174–186.
- Ware, Timothy (later religious name Kallistos) (1993). The Orthodox Church (IntraText CT ed.). Rome: Èulogos SpA (published 2007-05-29). pp. 52–61 – via intratext.com.
- Zizioulas, Ioannis (1996). "One single source: an Orthodox response to the clarification on the Filioque". 30 Days in the Church and in the World. 9. Newton, NJ: Italcoser: 42–. ISSN 0897-2435. Transcribed in Zizioulas, John (n.d.). "One single source: an Orthodox response to the clarification on the Filioque". orthodoxresearchinstitute.org. [s.l.]: Orthodox Research Institute. Commentary on PCPCU (1995)

== Bibliography ==
- "Filioque", article in the Oxford Dictionary of the Christian Church Oxford University Press, 2005, p. 614.
- David Bradshaw. Aristotle East and West: Metaphysics and the Division of Christendom. Cambridge: Cambridge University Press, 2004, pp. 214–220.
- Joseph P. Farrell. God, History, & Dialectic: The Theological Foundations of the Two Europes and Their Cultural Consequences. Bound edition 1997. Electronic edition 2008.
- John St. H. Gibaut, "The Cursus Honorum and the Western Case Against Photius", Logos 37 (1996), 35–73.
- Elizabeth Teresa Groppe. Yves Congar's Theology of the Holy Spirit. New York: Oxford University Press, 2004. See esp. pp. 75–79, for a summary of Congar's work on theFilioque. Congar is widely considered the most important Roman Catholic ecclesiologist of the twentieth century. He was influential in the composition of several Vatican II documents. Most important of all, he was instrumental in the association in the West of pneumatology and ecclesiology, a new development.
- David Guretzki.Karl Barth on the Filioque.Farnham, UK: Ashgate, 2009. ISBN 978-0-7546-6704-9. A close examination of Karl Barth's defense of the filioque and why his position is closer to an Eastern perspective than has typically been assumed.
- Richard Haugh. Photius and the Carolingians: The Trinitarian Controversy. Belmont, MA: Nordland Publishing Company, 1975.
- Joseph Jungmann, Pastoral Liturgy. London: Challoner, 1962. See "Christ our God", pp. 38–48.
- James Likoudis. Ending the Byzantine Greek Schism. New Rochelle, New York: 1992. An apologetic response to polemical attacks. A useful book for its inclusion of important texts and documents; see especially citations and works by Thomas Aquinas, O.P., Demetrios Kydones, Nikos A. Nissiotis, and Alexis Stawrowsky. The select bibliography is excellent. The author demonstrates that the Filioque dispute is only understood as part of a dispute over papal primacy and cannot be dealt with apart from ecclesiology.
- Bruce D. Marshall, "'Ex Occidente Lux?' Aquinas and Eastern Orthodox Theology", Modern Theology 20:1 (January, 2004), 23–50. Reconsideration of the views of Aquinas, especially on deification and grace, as well as his Orthodox critics. The author suggests that Aquinas may have a more accurate perspective than his critics, on the systematic questions of theology that relate to the Filioque dispute.
- Meyendorff, John (1983). Byzantine Theology: Historical Trends and Doctrinal Themes (Revised 2 ed.). New York: Fordham University Press. ISBN 9780823209675.
- Meyendorff, John (1996a). The Orthodox Church: Its Past and Its Role in the World Today (Revised 4th ed.). Crestwood, NY: St. Vladimir's Seminary Press. ISBN 9780913836811.
- Meyendorff, John (1996b). Rome, Constantinople, Moscow: Historical and Theological Studies. Crestwood, NY: St. Vladimir's Seminary Press. ISBN 9780881411348.
- Aristeides Papadakis. The Christian East and the Rise of the Papacy. Crestwood, NY: St. Vladimir's Seminary Press, 1994, pp. 232–238 and 379-408.
- Duncan Reid. Energies of the Spirit: Trinitarian Models in Eastern Orthodox and Western Theology. Atlanta, Georgia: Scholars Press, 1997.
- A. Edward Siecienski. The Use of Maximus the Confessor's Writing on the Filioque at the Council of Ferrara-Florence (1438–1439). Ann Arbor, Michigan: UMI Dissertation Services, 2005.
- Malon H. Smith, III. And Taking Bread: Cerularius and the Azyme Controversy of 1054. Paris: Beauschesne, 1978. This work is still valuable for understanding cultural and theological estrangement of East and West by the turn of the millennium. Now, it is evident that neither side understood the other; both Greek and Latin antagonists assumed their own practices were normative and authentic.
- Timothy [Kallistos] Ware. The Orthodox Way. Revised edition. Crestwood, New York: 1995, pp. 89–104.
