= Kaliman I of Bulgaria =

Emperor of Bulgaria from 1241 to 1246

Kaliman Asen I Калиман І Асен

Emperor of Bulgaria
- Reign: 1241–1246
- Predecessor: Ivan Asen II
- Successor: Michael Asen
- Born: 1234
- Died: August/September 1246 (aged 11–12)
- House: Asen dynasty
- Father: Ivan Asen II of Bulgaria
- Mother: Anna Maria of Hungary

Kaliman Asen I, also known as Coloman Asen I or Koloman (Bulgarian: Калиман Асен I; 1234 – August/September 1246) was Emperor (Tsar) of Bulgaria from 1241 to 1246. He was the son of Ivan Asen II of Bulgaria and Anna Maria of Hungary. He was only seven when he succeeded his father in 1241. In the following years, the Mongols invaded Bulgaria and imposed a yearly tax on the country. He may have been poisoned, according to contemporaneous rumors about his death.

== Early life ==
Kaliman was the son of Ivan Asen II of Bulgaria and Anna Maria of Hungary. He was born in 1234. His mother died before 1237 when his widowed father married Irene Komnene Doukaina. Ivan Asen also died in the first half of 1241.

== Reign ==
Kaliman was only seven when he succeeded his father. Although no primary sources provide information about the government of the country during the minor monarch's reign, Bulgaria was obviously ruled by one or more regents. Historian Alexandru Madgearu proposes that Ivan Asen's brother, Alexander, was most probably the sole regent for Kaliman; other scholars say a regency council was established under the leadership of Patriarch Joachim I. Bulgaria, the Latin Empire and the Empire of Nicaea signed a truce for two years shortly after Kaliman Asen's ascension.

Two contemporaneous clergymen, Roger of Torre Maggiore and Thomas the Archdeacon, recorded that Kadan (a son of Ögödei, Great Khan of the Mongols) broke into Bulgaria in March 1242. Thomas also mentioned that Kadan and Batu Khan "resolved to hold a muster of their military forces" in Bulgaria. Archaeological evidence shows that at least a dozen Bulgarian fortresses (including Tarnovo, Preslav and Isaccea) were destroyed during the Mongol invasion. Although the country was not occupied, the Bulgarians were to pay a tribute to the Mongols thereafter.

Pope Innocent IV convoked a synod at Lyon to establish a coalition against the Mongols in 1245. He also sent a letter to Kaliman, urging him to bring the Bulgarian Orthodox Church into a full communion with the Holy See and to send delegates to Lyon. Kaliman was only twelve when he died in August or September 1246. The contemporary Byzantine historian George Akropolites recorded that contradictory rumors spread about Kaliman's death. Some said that "he had succumbed to a natural illness"; others claimed that "he was killed by a draught secretly prepared to cause his death by those who were of contrary opinion to him". Patriarch Vissarion also died in September 1246. Madgearu says this coincidence implies that both were murdered by those who opposed the church union. According to a 14th-century charter, Kaliman Asan was the ruler of "Moldo-Wallachia" (or Moldavia).

== Honours ==
Kaliman Island in Antarctica is named after Emperor Kaliman Asen I of Bulgaria.

== Sources ==
=== Primary sources ===
- Archdeacon Thomas of Split: History of the Bishops of Salona and Split (Latin text by Olga Perić, edited, translated and annotated by Damir Karbić, Mirjana Matijević Sokol and James Ross Sweeney) (2006). CEU Press. ISBN 963-7326-59-6.
- George Akropolites: The History (Translated with and Introduction and Commentary by Ruth Macrides) (2007). Oxford University Press. ISBN 978-0-19-921067-1.
- The Successors of Genghis Khan (Translated from the Persian of Rashīd Al-Dīn by John Andrew Boyle) (1971). Columbia University Press. ISBN 0-231-03351-6.

=== Secondary sources ===
- Андреев (Andreev), Йордан (Jordan); Лазаров (Lazarov), Иван (Ivan); Павлов (Pavlov), Пламен (Plamen) (2012). Кой кой е в средновековна България [Who is Who in Medieval Bulgaria] (in Bulgarian). Изток Запад (Iztok Zapad). ISBN 978-619-152-012-1.
- Fine, John V. A. (1994). The Late Medieval Balkans: A Critical Survey from the Late Twelfth Century to the Ottoman Conquest. The University of Michigan Press. ISBN 0-472-08260-4.
- Madgearu, Alexandru (2016). The Asanids: The Political and Military History of the Second Bulgarian Empire, 1185–1280. BRILL. ISBN 978-9-004-32501-2.

Kaliman I of Bulgaria Asen dynasty Born: 1234 Died: August/October 1246
Regnal titles
| Preceded by Ivan Asen II | Emperor of Bulgaria; 1241–1246 | Succeeded by Michael Asen I |
