= List of Bulgarian royal consorts =

== First Bulgarian Empire ==
	=== First Bulgarian Empire ===								
Picture	Arms	Name	Father	Born	Married	Became Consort	Ceased to be Consort	Died	Spouse
		Maria	-	-	-	-	-	-	Boris I
		Maria Sursuvul	-	-	-	-	-	-	Simeon I
		Irene Lekapene	Christopher Lekapenos (Lekapenos)	-	-	-	c. 966	c. 966	Peter I of Bulgaria
		Agatha Chryselia	John Chryselios, Lord of Dyrrhachium (Chryselios)	-	-	-	-	-	Samuel
		Irene of Larissa	-	-	c. 999	6 October 1014	August 1015 she and her husband's assassinations		Gavril Radomir
		Maria of Bulgaria	Boris II of Bulgaria (Krum)	c. 960	c. 980	1015 husband's accession	1018 husband's death	after 1029	Ivan Vladislav

== Second Bulgarian Empire ==
	=== Second Bulgarian Empire ===								
Picture	Arms	Name	Father	Born	Married	Became Consort	Ceased to be Consort	Died	Spouse
		Elena-Evgenia	-	c. 1170	1183	1190 husband's accession	1196 husband's death	after 1196	Ivan Asen I
		Anna of Cumania	a Cuman aristocrat	-	-	1197 husband's accession	8 October 1207 husband's death	-	Kaloyan
		Anna of Cumania	a Cuman aristocrat	-	1207/08		- unclear if she was repudiated or died as consort	-	Boril
		Elisabeth of Courtenay	Peter II of Courtenay, Latin Emperor (Courtenay)	1199	1213		1218 husband's desposition	1269	Boril
		Anna Maria of Hungary	Andrew II of Hungary (Árpád)	early 1204	January 1221		autumn 1237		Ivan Asen II
		Irene Komnene Doukaina	Theodore Komnenos Doukas (Komnenodoukai)	before 1220	1237/38		24 June 1241 husband's death	after 1241	Ivan Asen II
		Anna of Halych	Rostislav Mikhailovich, Prince of Halych (Rurikids)	after 1243	1255		1256 husband's assassination	1296/8	Michael Asen I
		Anna of Halych	Rostislav Mikhailovich, Prince of Halych (Rurikids)	after 1243	1256		1256 husband's assassination	1296/8	Kaliman Asen II
		Maria Asenina	Ivan Asen II of Bulgaria (Asen)	1238–1241	-	1256 husband's accession	1257 husband's deposition	-	Mitso Asen
		Irene Doukaina Laskarina	Theodore II Laskaris (Laskaris)	c. 1239	early 1258		1268		Constantine I
		Maria Palaiologina Kantakouzene	John Kantakouzenos (Kantakouzenoi)	1249	1269		autumn 1277 husband's death	after 1294	Constantine I
		Maria Palaiologina Kantakouzene	John Kantakouzenos (Kantakouzenoi)	1249	1278		1279 husband's desposition	after 1294	Ivaylo
		Irene Palaiologina	Michael VIII Palaiologos (Palaiologoi)	1256	1278	1279 husband's accession	1280 husband's desposition	before 1328	Ivan Asen III
		Kira Maria Asenina	Mitso Asen of Bulgaria (Asen)	late 1250s	c. 1279	1280 husband's accession	1284 sent as hostage	-	George Terter I
		Maria	-	-	c. 1270	1284 returned from hostage	1292 husband's deposition	-	George Terter I
		Smiltsena Palaiologina	Constantine Palaiologos (Palaiologoi)	c. 1265	-	1292 husband's accession	1298 husband's death	after 1306	Smilets
		Euphrosyne	Mankus, a merchant in Constantinople	-	-	1300 husband's accession	-		Theodore Svetoslav
		Theodora Palaiologina	Michael IX Palaiologos (Palaiologoi)	-	1320		1322 husband's desposition	after 1330	Theodore Svetoslav
		Ana-Neda	Stefan Milutin (Nemanjić)	-	after 1308	June 1323 husband's election	1324 repudiated	after 1346	Michael Shishman
		Theodora Palaiologina; Second time	Michael IX Palaiologos (Palaiologoi)	-	after August 1324		28 July 1330 husband's death	after 1330	Michael Shishman
		Theodora of Wallachia	Basarab I of Wallachia (Basarab)	-	1320	1331 husband's election	1340 repudiated	after 1340	Ivan Alexander
		Sarah-Theodora	-	-	1345		17 February 1371 husband's death	after 1367	Ivan Alexander
		Maria-Irene Palaiologina	Andronikos III Palaiologos (Palaiologoi)	1327	1336 as co-empress consort		1354 husband's death	after 1356	Michael Asen IV
		Kira Maria	Desislav	-	-	1360 as co-empress consort 17 February 1371 as sole-empress	early 1380s		Ivan Shishman
		Dragana of Serbia	Lazar of Serbia (Lazarević)	-	around 1386		3 June 1395 husband's death	before July 1395	Ivan Shishman
	=== Tsardom of Vidin ===								
		unknown	-	-	1240s as co-empress consort 1360 as empress consort of Vidin		-		Ivan Sratsimir
		Anna Slava of Wallachia	Nicholas Alexander of Wallachia (Basarab)	before 1345	before 1369		1397 husband's death	-	Ivan Sratsimir
		Elizabeth of Bosnia	Stephen II, Ban of Bosnia (Kotromanić)	-	-			-	Louis I of Hungary

== Third Bulgarian State ==
	=== Principality of Bulgaria ===								
Picture	Arms	Name	Father	Born	Married	Became Consort	Ceased to be Consort	Died	Spouse
		Marie Louise of Parma	Robert I, Duke of Parma (Bourbon-Parma)	17 January 1870	20 April 1893		31 January 1899		Ferdinand I
		Eleonore Reuss of Köstritz	Prince Heinrich IV Reuss of Köstritz (Reuss-Köstritz)	22 August 1860	28 February 1908		5 October 1908 became Tsaritsa consort	12 September 1917	Ferdinand I
	=== Eastern Rumelia ===								
		Aspasia Baltazzi	Emmanuel Evangelos Baltazzi (Baltazzi)	1839	13 March 1879		April 1899		Alexander Bogoridi
		Euphrosyne Sofianou							Gavril Krastevich
		Marie Louise of Parma	Robert I, Duke of Parma (Bourbon-Parma)	17 January 1870	20 April 1893		31 January 1899		Ferdinand I
	=== Tsardom of Bulgaria ===								
		Eleonore Reuss of Köstritz	Prince Heinrich IV Reuss of Köstritz (Reuss-Köstritz)	22 August 1860	28 February 1908	5 October 1908 became Tsaritsa consort	12 September 1917		Ferdinand I
		Giovanna of Italy	Victor Emmanuel III of Italy (Savoy)	13 November 1907	25 October 1930		28 August 1943 husband's death	26 February 2000	Boris III
