= List of Bulgarian monarchs =

Tsar of the Bulgarians
- Царь на Българитѣ
- Standard of the Tsar of Bulgaria (1945)

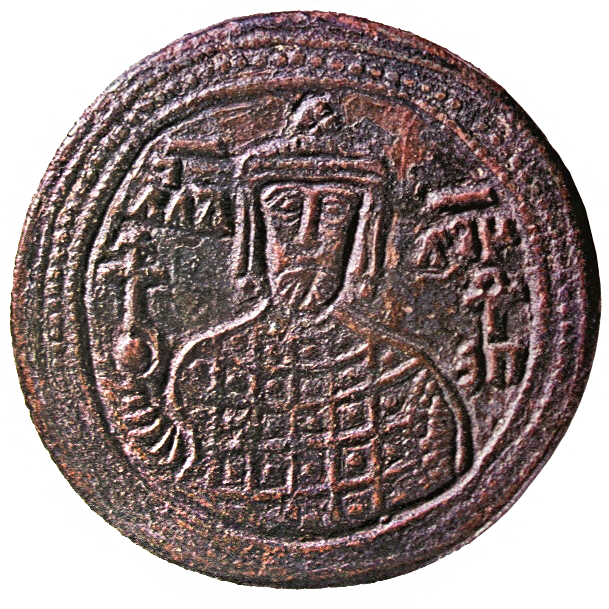
- Longest reign Peter I 927–969

Details
- Style: His Majesty
- First monarch: Asparuh (khan); Boris I (knyaz); Simeon I (Tsar)
- Last monarch: Simeon II
- Formed: c. 681
- Abolished: 15 September 1946
- Residences: Various historically Tsarevets (1185–1393); Royal Palace (1882–1946)
- Appointer: Variously hereditary or elective
- Pretender: Simeon II

The monarchs of Bulgaria ruled Bulgaria during the medieval First (c. 681–1018) and Second (1185–1396) Bulgarian empires, as well as during the modern Principality (1878–1908) and Tsardom (Kingdom) (1908–1946) of Bulgaria. This list includes monarchs from the establishment of the First Bulgarian Empire until modern times, omitting earlier mythical rulers as well as rulers of separate states such as Old Great Bulgaria and Volga Bulgaria.

Various titles have been used by the rulers of Bulgaria. The only recorded title, used before Bulgaria's conversion to Christianity, is kanasubigi, likely meaning "Khan, Lord of the Army" or "the sublime Khan". When Bulgaria converted to Christianity in the ninth century, the ruler Boris I (852–889) was using the title knyaz (prince). For much of its later history under the first and second empires, Bulgaria functioned as a multi-ethnic imperial state modelled on the neighbouring Byzantine Empire, which contributed to the adoption of the title of tsar (emperor) by Bulgarian monarchs beginning with Simeon I (893–927) in 913. Some powerful medieval Bulgarian rulers challenged Byzantine authority by proclaiming themselves as both Bulgarian and Roman emperors.

When Bulgaria re-emerged as a state in 1878 in the form of the Principality of Bulgaria, the rulers initially used the title knyaz since they were autonomous vassals of the Ottoman Empire and not fully independent. From Bulgaria's complete independence from the Ottomans in 1908 until the abolition of the monarchy in 1946, Bulgarian monarchs once more used the title tsar, though this time generally translated internationally as "king" rather than "emperor".

== Titles ==
=== Titles in the First Bulgarian Empire (681–1018) ===
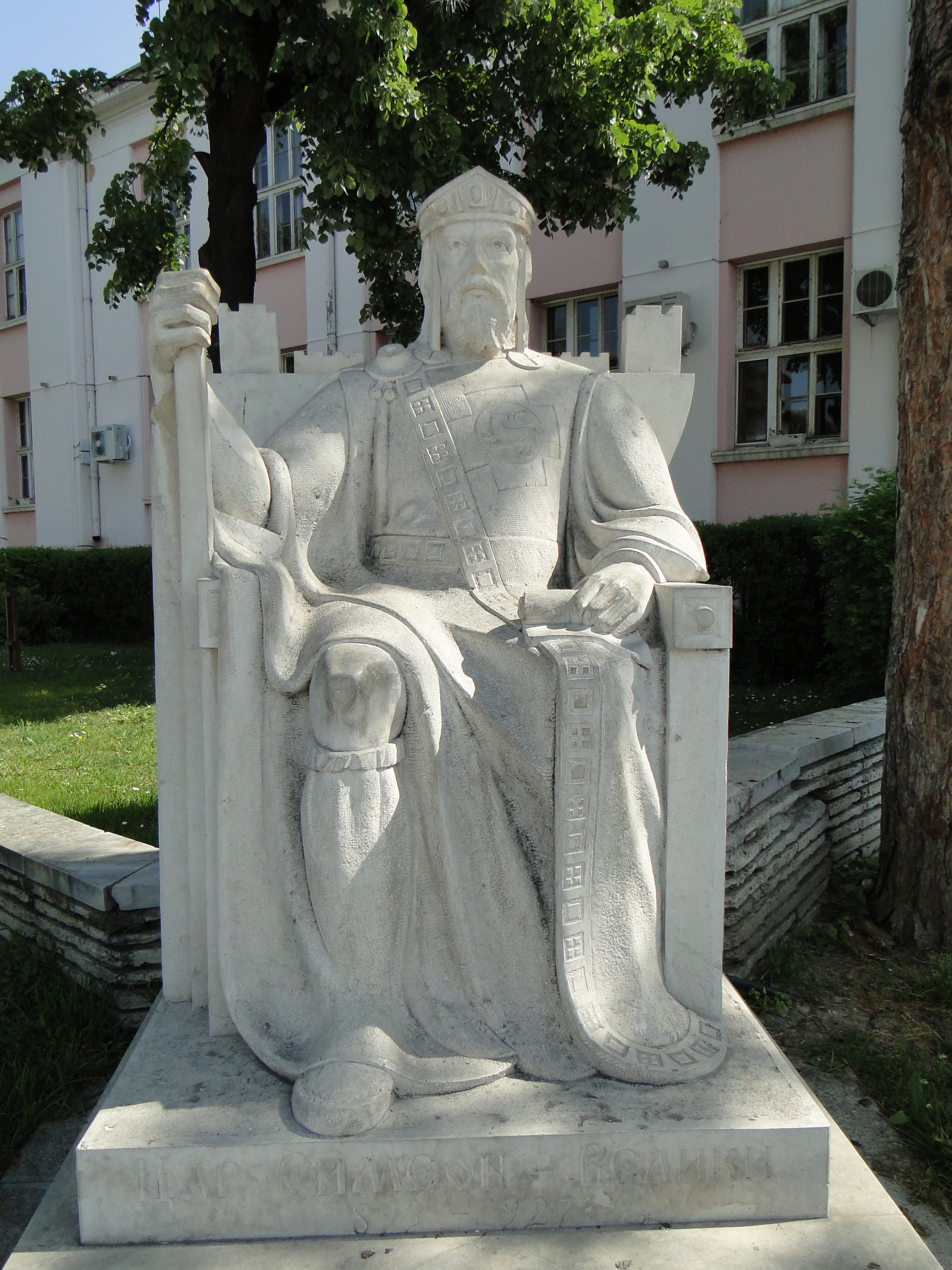
Simeon I (893–927) was the first Bulgarian ruler to rule as tsar. His official title translates to "Emperor of the Bulgarians and the Romans".

Evidence concerning the titles used by the rulers of the First Bulgarian Empire (681–1018) prior to the conversion to Christianity in the 860s is scant. The only title known from contemporary sources is kanasubigi, recorded in ten Greek-language inscriptions (as ΚΑΝΑΣΥΒΙΓΙ) from the ninth century in reference to Omurtag (814–831) and his son Malamir (831–836). Two gold medallions struck for Omurtag also use the same title.

Upon his conversion to Christianity in 864/865, Boris I (852–889) adopted the new ruling title knyaz, generally translated as "prince" (though sometimes alternatively as "king"). This title was used by the Bulgarian rulers until 913, when the knyaz Simeon I (893–927), Boris I's son, invaded the Byzantine Empire. Simeon aspired to make Bulgaria into the new "universal monarchy" (a role the Byzantines viewed themselves as having) by absorbing and replacing the empire centered in Constantinople. Due to the threat presented by Simeon, who reached the walls of Constantinople, the Byzantines relented and the Patriarch of Constantinople, Nicholas Mystikos, granted him an imperial crown. The only other monarch recognized as a basileus (i.e. emperor) by the Byzantines was (at times) the Holy Roman emperor. The Byzantines did not consider Simeon as outranking their own emperors and designated him as the "Emperor of the Bulgarians". Simeon himself used the grander title "Emperor of the Bulgarians and the Romans". The title of emperor was in Bulgarian translated as tsar (deriving from the Latin caesar), seen as equivalent to the Greek basileus or Latin imperator.

Bulgarian rulers from the death of Simeon I in 927 until the fall of the First Bulgarian Empire in 1018 used the simpler "Emperor of the Bulgarians", ceasing to claim Byzantium's universal monarchy.

=== Titles in the Second Bulgarian Empire (1185–1422) ===
Bulgarian royal titles
681–864	Kanasubigi
864–913	Knyaz
913–927	Tsar of the Bulgarians and the Romans
927–1018	Tsar of the Bulgarians
1018–1185	—
1185–1204	Tsar of the Bulgarians
1204–1207	King of the Bulgarians and Vlachs
1207–1230	Tsar of the Bulgarians
1230–1241	Tsar and Autocrat of the Bulgarians and Greeks
1241–1340s	Tsar and Autocrat of the Bulgarians
1340s–1395	Tsar and Autocrat of the Bulgarians and Greeks
1395–1422	Tsar and Autocrat of the Bulgarians
1422–1879	—
1879–1908	Knyaz of Bulgaria
1908–1946	Tsar of the Bulgarians

The first rulers of the Second Bulgarian Empire (1185–1422) revived the style used by Simeon I's successors, "Emperor of the Bulgarians", rendered tsr’ Bl’garom in Bulgarian documents and imperator Bulgarorum in Latin. The second empire's third ruler, Kaloyan (1196–1207), adopted the grander title "Emperor of Bulgarians and Vlachs" (imperator Bulgarorum et Blachorum). He unsuccessfully sought recognition of this title from the Papacy, though Pope Innocent III merely recognized him as "King of the Bulgarians and Vlachs" (rex Bulgarorum et Blachorum), not wishing to recognize any other emperor than the Holy Roman emperor.

The fifth ruler of the second empire, Ivan Asen II (1218–1241) after 1230 extended his original title "Emperor of the Bulgarians" to the grander "Emperor of the Bulgarians and Greeks" (tsr’ Bl’garom i Gr’kom, Latin: imperator Bulgarorum et Grecorum). This title was taken to reflect his extensive conquests in formerly Byzantine territory and was effectively a revival of Simeon I's title since both "Greeks" and "Romans" were envisioned as referring to the inhabitants of the Byzantine Empire. Ivan Asen II also introduced the element "autocrat" (Bulgarian: samodrzac, Latin: moderator) into the Bulgarian imperial title, modelled on its usage in the Byzantine imperial title, and eventually in full styled himself as the "Emperor and Autocrat of the Bulgarians and Greeks" (Bulgarian: tsr’ i samodrzac Bl’garom i Gr’kom, Latin: imperator et moderator Bulgarorum et Grecorum).

Ivan Asen II's successors kept "autocrat" in the title but returned to the simpler style "Emperor and Autocrat of the Bulgarians". His extended title was later revived by Ivan Alexander (1331–1371), who also proclaimed himself as the "Emperor and Autocrat of the Bulgarians and Greeks" to challenge the authority of the then weakened Byzantine Empire. Ivan Alexander's son Ivan Shishman (1371–1395) is also recorded to have used this extended imperial title.

=== Titles in modern Bulgaria (1878–1946) ===
The Tarnovo Constitution of the modern Principality of Bulgaria (1878–1908) stipulated that the monarch was to use the title "Knyaz of Bulgaria" (i.e. "Prince of Bulgaria") rather than tsar due to the principality being an autonomous vassal state of the Ottoman Empire rather than a fully independent country.

When Bulgaria achieved complete independence from the Ottoman Empire in 1908, the former knyaz Ferdinand I (1887–1918) adopted the higher title of "Tsar of the Bulgarians", as had been used by Bulgarian monarchs in the Middle Ages. The assumption of the title of tsar was met with opposition from both the Ottomans and the Russian Empire. Although tsar had been understood as equivalent to emperor in medieval times, the title of the new Bulgarian tsars was generally translated as "King of the Bulgarians" internationally.

== Names and regnal numbers ==
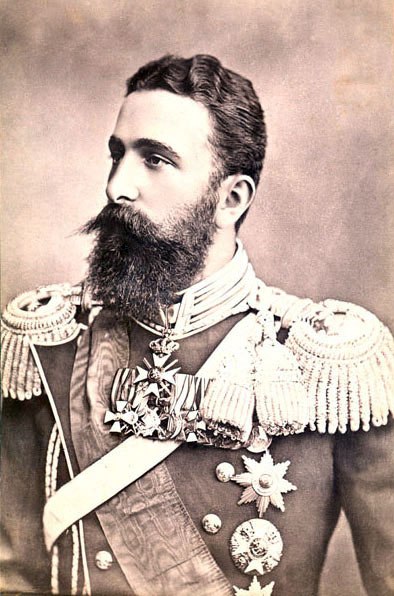
Alexander I (1879–1886) was the first Bulgarian monarch to officially use a regnal number

Regnal numbers for monarchs have only been officially used in Bulgaria in modern times, beginning with Alexander I in 1879. Modern historiography retroactively also assigns sequential regnal numbers to medieval Bulgarian rulers, even if they ruled different Bulgarian states and used different titles; Boris I (852–889) ruled the First Bulgarian Empire as a prince (knyaz), his great-grandson Boris II (967–977) ruled the same state as emperor, and Boris III (1918–1943) ruled the modern Kingdom of Bulgaria as tsar (king).

There were three different types of names used by medieval Bulgarian monarchs after Bulgaria converted to Christianity; names drawn from Bulgar or Slavic tradition (i.e. Boris, Boril, Vladimir, Presian), names drawn from Christian tradition (i.e. Michael, Simeon, Peter, Ivan, Samuel), or double names combining both (i.e. Ivan Vladislav, Gavril Radomir, Ivan Sratsimir, Theodore Svetoslav). When using a double name, the Christian name always preceded the name drawn from local tradition. Very rarely, Bulgarian rulers used double names combining two Christian names (i.e. Ivan Stephen, Ivan Alexander).

The use of double names by Bulgarian monarchs, sometimes not used consistently in contemporary sources, (Note: Monarchs with double names are in formal contexts most often recorded with both names. Ivan Asen II (1218–1241) is sometimes recorded merely using his second name (Asen). His sons Kaliman Asen I (1241–1246) and Michael Asen I (1246–1256) are sometimes recorded to only use their first names (Kaliman, Michael). Similarly, George Terter I (1280–1292) is in at least one contemporary source referred to merely as George. In most official documents, Ivan Alexander (1331–1371) and his sons Ivan Sratsimir (1356–1397) and Ivan Shishman (1371–1395) are referred to with their full double names, but in less formal contexts they are sometimes referred to merely by their more characteristic second names (Alexander, Sratsimir, and Shishman).) has in cases led to confusion and misunderstanding in modern efforts to assign regnal numbers. In particular, it has sometimes erroneously been assumed that the usage of double names indicated that the monarchs employed family names; this interpretation has in the past resulted in the use of names such as Ivan II Asen (for Ivan Asen II), George I Terter (for George Terter I) and Michael III Shishman (for Michael Asen III). Names of clans were prominently used in Bulgaria in pre-Christian times, though disappeared from usage sometime after the conversion to Christianity, despite family names being used in some of Bulgaria's closest neighbours (such as the Byzantine Empire). Although names such as Asen or Terter could serve as genealogical and political markers to demonstrate a ruler's position in an illustrious lineage they were also fully part of the ruler's regnal names, as demonstrated by those rulers whose double names excluded genealogical connections (such as Ivan Alexander). Double names with genealogical connotations were at times also claimed by rulers not belonging to the same dynastic lineage, such as Mitso Asen (1256–1257; who married into the Asen dynasty).

== First Bulgarian Empire (c. 680–1018) ==
=== Early Bulgarian rulers (c. 680–803) ===
The First Bulgarian Empire is regarded to have been established c. 680 when the Bulgarian ruler Asparuh crossed the Danube. Asparuh's family, the Dulo clan, claimed descent from the Hunnic ruler Attila, through Attila's son Ernak. References to political developments within Bulgaria prior to the reign of Krum (c. 803–814) are extremely scant, making the dates and family relationships of the rulers recorded in contemporary and later sources highly uncertain. The rulers below may all belong to the Dulo clan or might alternatively have belonged to various competing clans. Several alternate chronologies of early Bulgarian rulers have been proposed, with some presented below, with the names standardized across sources:

Moskov (1988):	Fine (1991): (originally 1983)	Treadgold (1997):	Morby (2014):	Detrez (2014):	Curta (2019):
Asparuh (668–695)	Asparuh (670s–701)	Asparuh (681–c.701)	Asparuh (680–700)	Asparuh (641–701)	Asparuh (681–c.700)
Tervel (695–714)	Tervel (701–718)	Tervel (c.701–c.718)	Tervel (700–721)	Tervel (701–718)	Tervel (c.700–721)
anonymous (714–715)					
Kormesiy (715–721)	Unknown (718–725)		Kormisosh (721–738)	Unknown (718–c.725)	Kormisosh (721–738)
Sevar (721–737)	Sevar (725–739)	Sevar (c.718–750)	Sevar (738–753)	Sevar (c.725–739)	Sevar (738–753/4)
Kormisosh (737–754)	Kormisosh (739–756)	Kormisosh (750–762)		Kormisosh (739–756)	
Vineh (754–760)	Vineh (756–c.761)	Vineh and	Vineh (753–760)	Vineh (756–762)	Vineh (753/4–760)
Telets (760–763)	Telets (c.761–c.764)	Telets (762–763)	Telets (760–763)	Telets (762–765)	Telets (760–763)
Sabin (763–765)	Sabin (c.764–767)		Sabin (763–766)	Sabin (765–767)	Sabin (763–766)
Umor (765)	Umor (767)	Umor (763)	Umor (766)	Umor (767)	Umor (766)
Toktu (765–766)	Toktu (767–c.769)	Pagan (763–765)	Toktu (766–767)	Toktu (767–772)	Toktu (766–767)
Pagan (766–767)	Pagan (c.770)	Toktu (765)	Pagan (767–768)	Pagan (772/3)	Pagan (767–768)
Telerig (767–777)	Telerig (c.770–777)	Telerig (765?–777)	Telerig (768–777)	Telerig (772/3–777)	Telerig (768–777)
Kardam (777–803)	Kardam (777–c.803)	Kardam (777?–c.803)	Kardam (777–803)	Kardam (777–802)	Kardam (777–803)

=== House of Krum (803–997) ===
Image	Name	Reign	Succession and notes
	Krum; Крум	c. 803?–814 (c. 11-17 years)	Possibly a descendant of the Dulo clan. Krum may have ascended the throne as early as 796/7. Successful warrior and conqueror; defeated the Avars and incorporated parts of Transylvania and eastern Serbia into Bulgaria. Replaced customary law in Bulgaria with written legislation. Most known for his wars against the Byzantine Empire. In 811 his forces defeated and killed Emperor Nikephoros I at the Battle of Pliska, whereafter the emperor's skull was fashioned into a drinking cup. Died suddenly while preparing a campaign intended to conquer Constantinople.
	Dukum; Дукум	possibly 814 (briefly)	Brother of Krum. An experienced military commander who played an important role in Krum's military campaigns. Possibly seized the throne after Krum's death but died almost immediately, presumably of natural causes. Some historians consider Dukum, named only in hagiographical sources, merely a local ruler and not a monarch, with Krum perhaps being succeeded directly by his son Omurtag.
	Ditzeng (Note: "Tsok", a Bulgarian ruler briefly mentioned in a single Byzantine source as persecuting Christian prisoners, is presumably the same person as Ditzeng.); Диценг	possibly 814–815 (1 year)	Unknown relation; presumably a brother or nephew of Krum. Recorded as persecutor of Christian prisoners. May have been in ill health at the time of his accession. Some historians consider Ditzeng, named only in hagiographical sources, merely a local ruler and not a monarch, with Krum perhaps being succeeded directly by his son Omurtag.
	Omurtag; Омуртаг	814/815–831 (16-17 years)	Son of Krum. May have seized the throne from Ditzeng or succeeded his father Krum directly. Signed a 30-year peace treaty with the Byzantine Empire in 815. Devoted much of his reign to construction projects. At times aided the Byzantines, such as joining the war against the Byzantine pretender Thomas the Slav. Solidified the Bulgarian central government.
	Malamir; Маламир	831–836 (5 years)	Son of Omurtag. Malamir was possibly underage throughout his reign and the Bulgarian administration was headed by the regent Isbul. His five-year reign saw renewed conflict and warfare with the Byzantine Empire. Died of unknown causes, no longer occupying the Bulgarian throne by 836.
	Presian I Пресиян	836–852 (16 years)	Son of Zvinitsa, a son of Omurtag. Underage at the time of his accession, the administration was initially headed by the regent Isbul. Although hostile to the Byzantine Empire, Presian spent the better part of his reign working to expand Bulgaria rather than fighting the Byzantines. His reign saw the Bulgarians push west of the Vardar river for the first time and led to considerable territorial gains in the west.
	Boris I (Note: Sometimes referred to as Boris-Michael or Michael I given that he was baptized under the name Michael. Boris I however continued after his baptism to most often only use the name "Boris".); Борис	852–889 (36 years)	Son of Presian I. Unsuccessfully warred against Serbia and Croatia. Under pressure from the Byzantine emperor Michael III, Boris was responsible for converting Bulgaria to Christianity, he himself being baptized in 864/865. Adopted the new ruling title of knyaz (prince) at the time of his conversion. Defeated a major uprising of pagans against his rule. Abdicated in favour of his son Vladimir in 889 and retired to a monastery, dying in 907. Considered a saint in the Eastern Orthodox Church.
	Vladimir; Владимир Расате	889–893 (4 years)	Son of Boris I. The Bulgarian nobility revolted against Christianity after Boris's abdication and Vladimir took part in persecuting Christians and destroying churches. Also abandoned relations with the Byzantine Empire. Boris returned from retirement in 893 and deposed, blinded, and imprisoned Vladimir. Boris's other son Simeon was thereafter made ruler.
	Simeon I Симеон	893–927 (34 years)	Son of Boris I. Made knyaz (prince) after the deposition of Vladimir. Aspiring to supplant or conquer the Byzantine Empire, Simeon was in 913 the first Bulgarian ruler to assume the title of tsar (emperor) and was recognized as such by the Byzantines. Fought many wars with the Byzantine Empire, though never succeeded in capturing Constantinople. Extended Bulgarian rule far into Macedonia, Albania, and Serbia but appears to have lost the Bulgarian lands north of the Danube. Proclaimed the Bulgarian Orthodox Church to be independent under its own patriarch.
	Peter I Петър	927–969 (42 years)	Son of Simeon I. Faced invasions from the Magyars and uprisings by some of his brothers. Otherwise had a relatively peaceful reign; achieved important diplomatic gains from the Byzantines, such as the recognition of his imperial title, the recognition of the Bulgarian church's independence, and an imperial marriage. Abdicated and retired to a monastery in 969 after suffering a stroke. Considered a saint in the Bulgarian Orthodox Church.
	Boris II; Борис	969–977 (Note: De facto ruled only 969–971 and thereafter in Byzantine captivity, though remained recognized and unchallenged as the legitimate monarch in Bulgaria itself.) (8 years)	Son of Peter I. Contended with invasions by the Kievan Rus' and the Byzantine Empire. The Bulgarian capital of Preslav was captured by the Byzantine Empire in 971, resulting in Boris and his brother Roman being brought to Constantinople as prisoners. Power in Bulgaria fell to a group of four nobles, the cometopuli brothers, who upheld the rights of Boris while he was held prisoner. The two brothers escaped back to Bulgaria in 977, though Boris was killed during the journey.
	Roman; Роман	977–997 (Note: De facto ruled only 977–991 and thereafter in Byzantine captivity, though remained recognized and unchallenged as the legitimate monarch in Bulgaria itself.) (20 years)	Son of Peter I. Previously held captive by the Byzantines in Constantinople. Infrequently mentioned in surviving sources and appears to have been more of a figurehead for the cometopuli than an active ruler. Captured by the Byzantines again in 991 and died in captivity six years later.

=== House of Cometopuli (997–1018) ===
Image	Name	Reign	Succession and notes
	Samuel; Самуил	997–1014 (17 years)	The youngest of the cometopuli, the sons of a noble named Nicholas. Samuel and his brothers had some relation to the preceding royal dynasty, possibly being cousins of Boris II and Roman. One of the primary Bulgarian military leaders from 971 onwards and proclaimed emperor after Roman's death. Relatively successful in staving off the Byzantine conquest of the remaining Bulgarian territories. Died of a heart attack brought on by the sight of the thousands of Bulgarian soldiers blinded by the Byzantine emperor Basil II after the Battle of Kleidion.
	Gavril Radomir; Гаврил Радомир	1014–1015 (less than a year)	Son of Samuel. Murdered by his cousin Ivan Vladislav after a reign of less than a year.
	Ivan Vladislav; Иван Владислав	1015–1018 (3 years)	Son of Aron, a brother of Samuel. Led the defense against the Byzantine Empire as Emperor Basil II once more invaded Bulgaria and killed at the Battle of Dyrrhachium in 1018. After his death, the Bulgarian nobility became divided among two parties, one headed by Ivan Vladislav's widow Maria and one headed by his son Presian II. Maria formally surrendered Bulgaria to Basil.
Bulgaria was conquered by the Byzantine Empire in the Byzantine conquest of Bulgaria (968–1018), resulting in the fall of the First Bulgarian Empire

== Pretenders during Byzantine rule (1018–1185) ==
Various Byzantine military governors (with the title strategos) were appointed in formerly Bulgarian lands over the course of the Byzantine conquest of Bulgaria, from the 970s onwards. Following the completion of the conquest of Bulgaria in 1018, Emperor Basil II organized much of the central Balkans into the Theme of Bulgaria, which was governed by an imperially appointed official titled (depending on the time) as the doux (duke) or katepano of Bulgaria. The capital of Byzantine Bulgaria was Skopion (modern-day Skopje). There were several attempts at restoring the Bulgarian Empire during the nearly two centuries of Byzantine rule.

Image	Name	Reign	Succession and notes
	Presian II; Пресиян	1018 (less than a year)	Son of Ivan Vladislav. Although most of the Bulgarian aristocracy surrendered to the Byzantine Empire alongside Maria, Presian II and some of his brothers continued to lead a small resistance, based around the Tomorr mountain range. They were eventually also forced to surrender to the Byzantines.
	Peter Delyan (Note: Sometimes enumerated as Peter II.); Петър Делян	1040–1041 (1 year)	Claimed to be a grandson of Gavril Radomir, though his ancestry is unverified. Servant of a Byzantine aristocrat; escaped to Belgrade and proclaimed himself emperor with the support of Bulgarian aristocrats. Fought against the Byzantine Empire for control of Bulgaria until betrayed and blinded by Alusian. Continued to lead some troops until his defeat at the Battle of Ostrovo; later fate unknown.
	Tihomir; Тихомир	1040 (less than a year)	Bulgarian military commander in Dyrrhachium. Proclaimed himself emperor after hearing of Peter Delyan's revolt. Deposed and executed after Delyan proved to be more popular among the Bulgarians.
	Alusian; Алусиан	1041 (less than a year)	Son of Ivan Vladislav. Governor of one of the Byzantine Empire's Armenian provinces. Travelled to Bulgaria to join Peter Delyan's uprising as a military leader. After relations between the two deteriorated, Alusian betrayed and blinded Delyan and was proclaimed emperor in his stead. Surrendered to the Byzantines after losing a battle.
	Constantine Bodin (Note: Took the regnal name Peter and is therefore sometimes enumerated as Peter III.); Константин Бодин	1072 (less than a year)	Matrilineal great-great-grandson of Samuel and son of the anti-Byzantine Serbian ruler Mihailo I. Invited by Bulgarian nobles and acclaimed Bulgarian emperor during Georgi Voyteh's uprising against the Byzantine Empire. The uprising was defeated after a few months and Bodin was in Byzantine captivity until 1078. Later reigned as King of Dioclea 1081–1101.

== Second Bulgarian Empire (1185–1422) ==
=== House of Asen (1185–1256) ===
Image	Name	Reign	Succession and notes
	Peter II (Note: Enumerated as Peter IV if the rebels Peter Delyan (Peter II) and Constantine Bodin (Peter III) are also counted.); Петър	1185–1197 (12 years)	Aristocrat, probably of Vlach origin, with no relation to previous monarchs. (Note: The House of Asen has in the past sometimes been suggested to have descended from the monarchs of the First Bulgarian Empire given that Kaloyan (1196–1207) was identified by Pope Innocent III (1198–1216) in a letter as descended from them. This is conventionally interpreted as the pope merely recognizing Kaloyan as the legitimate successor (and not a genealogical descendant) of the earlier tsars, in a way common for the time.) Revolted against the Byzantine Empire alongside his brother Ivan Asen 1185 after being slighted by Emperor Isaac II Angelos. Proclaimed himself Bulgarian emperor in November 1185. After years of fighting, Isaac in 1188 recognized the brothers as rulers of an independent Bulgarian state, though skirmishes continued thereafter. Ivan Asen was later made the senior co-ruler (ruling from Tarnovo), with Peter ruling from Preslav. Murdered in 1197.
	Ivan Asen I Иван Асен	c. 1188–1196 (c. 8 years)	Brother of Peter II; co-leader in their revolt against the Byzantine Empire. Made senior co-ruler at some point between 1187 and early 1190. Murdered in 1196.
	Kaloyan (Ivan I) (Note: In his formal titulature, Kaloyan referred to himself by the name Kaloyan (rendered in Latin as Calojoannes). He is additionally counted as "Ivan I" since Ivan (without a double name) was his original name; "Kaloyan" derives from the Greek Kaloïōannēs and is an ornate and flattering nickname meaning "John [Ivan] the Good".); Калоян (Иван)	1196–1207 (9 years)	Brother of Peter II and Ivan Asen I. Foiled efforts at separatism by some of the nobility and consolidated royal power. Considerably expanded Bulgarian territory through wars with Serbia, Hungary, and the Byzantine Empire. Increased his expansion into Byzantine lands following the collapse of the Byzantine Empire due to the Fourth Crusade (1202–1204). Later fought against the Latin Empire, defeating its first emperor (Baldwin I). Believed to have been murdered.
	Boril; Борил	1207–1218 (11 years)	Son of a sister of Peter II, Ivan Asen I and Kaloyan. Boril's reign saw unsuccessful wars against Serbia, the Latin Empire, and the competing successor states of the Byzantine Empire, as well as the spread of the Bogomilist sect in Bulgaria. Deposed and blinded by his cousin Ivan Asen II.
	Ivan Asen II; Иван Асен	1218–1241 (23 years)	Son of Ivan Asen I. Overthrew Boril. Ivan Asen II aspired to make himself the ruler of a joint Bulgarian-Byzantine Empire and his reign saw the Second Bulgarian Empire reach its greatest extent. Defeated the Empire of Thessalonica at the Battle of Klokotnitsa (1230), whereafter much of its territory was annexed and Bulgaria became the most powerful state in southeastern Europe. Re-established the independent Bulgarian Orthodox Church under a patriarch in 1235.
	Kaliman Asen I Калиман Асен	1241–1246 (5 years)	Son of Ivan Asen II. Underage at the time of his accession. Murdered after a reign of five years.
	Michael Asen I (Note: Often referred to as Michael II Asen, although this is incorrect. This enumeration derives from Boris I (852–889) having been baptized under the name Michael. Boris I however continued to most often merely use "Boris" and the emperors of the Second Bulgarian Empire used the double name Michael Asen (Asen being part of the name and not some other form of qualifier) rather than just "Michael".); Мицо Асен	1246–1256 (10 years)	Son of Ivan Asen II. Underage at the time of his accession. Ambushed and killed in 1256 by a group of Bulgarian nobles after a treaty in which Michael Asen I returned all of Bulgaria's territorial gains in former Byzantine territory to the Empire of Nicaea.
	Kaliman Asen II; Калиман Асен	1256 (less than a year)	Grandson of Ivan Asen I. Proclaimed emperor after Michael Asen I's death. Married his predecessor's widow but was ineffective at maintaining power and died within a year. His death extinguished the male line of the House of Asen.

=== Successors of the Asenids (1256–1280) ===
The end of the male line of the House of Asen plunged Bulgaria into a chaotic period of fragmentation and civil wars between numerous lines of claimants.

Image	Name	Reign	Succession and notes
	Mitso Asen; Мицо Асен	1256–1263 (7 years)	Husband of Maria Asenina, a daughter of Ivan Asen II. Proclaimed emperor in southeastern Bulgaria either in opposition to Kaliman Asen II or after his death. Unclear if he ever gained control of the capital of Tarnovo, though he may have held it briefly in 1256–1257. Later established himself in the lands surrounding Mesembria. Gave Mesembria to the Byzantine Empire in 1263 after attacks by Constantine I Tih, in return being allowed to live out his life in exile in Anatolia.
	Rostislav Mikhailovich; Ростислав Михайлович (Pretender in Vidin)	1257–1262 (5 years)	Father-in-law of Michael Asen I and Kaliman Asen II. Invaded Bulgaria, though was unable to take the capital of Tarnovo. Occupied Vidin and governed the surrounding area as self-proclaimed Bulgarian emperor, supported by the Kingdom of Hungary. Left landless after an attack by Constantine I Tih in 1260, though restored with Hungarian aid in 1261, claiming the same title again until his death in 1262.
	Constantine I Tih (Note: The actual regnal name of this monarch was Constantine Asen, as attested in contemporary Bulgarian documents. The conventional designation "Konstantin Tih" (meaning "Constantine, the son of Tih[omir]") was never used in medieval Bulgaria itself and instead derives from Byzantine sources.); Константин Асен	1257–1277 (20 years)	Elected emperor in Tarnovo in 1257 by the Bulgarian nobility, in opposition to both Mitso Asen and Rostislav. Married Irene Doukaina Laskarina, a granddaughter of Ivan Asen II, in order to boost his legitimacy. Ultimately victorious in the civil wars of the 1250s and 1260s. Later remarried to Maria Palaiologina Kantakouzene, a niece of the Byzantine emperor Michael VIII Palaiologos. Defeated and killed in battle by the peasant rebel Ivaylo.
	Jacob Svetoslav; Яков Светослав (Pretender in Vidin)	1266–c. 1273 (c. 7 years)	Noble of princely Russian origin. Initially loyal to Constantine I Tih, fighting on his side with the title of despot in the wars against Hungary (1261) and the Byzantine Empire (1262–1263). Came in possession of Vidin c. 1263 and gradually fell under Hungarian suzerainty. Referred to as "Bulgarian emperor" in Hungarian documents from 1266 onwards. Asserted his independence from Hungary c. 1273 and re-aligned himself with Constantine again; adopted as a second son by Constantine's wife (making him second-in-line to the throne) but later poisoned by her c. 1275.
	Michael Asen II; Михаил Асен	1277–1279 (2 years)	Son of Constantine I; previously junior co-emperor c. 1272–1277. Underage at the time of his accession, his mother Maria Palaiologina Kantakouzene ruled as regent. In 1278 made co-ruler with Ivaylo, who married Maria. Deposed by the Byzantine-supported Ivan Asen III and sent as a captive to Constantinople.
	"Ivaylo" (Note: It is doubtful that Ivaylo was this ruler's real name given that the only medieval source using it (the Svrljig gospels) might instead be informally referring to his successor Ivan Asen III. The only other names applied to him in medieval sources are the Greek nicknames Lakhanas and Kordokoubas, attested in Byzantine sources.); Ивайло	1278–1279 (1 year)	An illiterate swineherd who became leader of a peasant uprising and seized control of much of Bulgaria. Became a legitimate monarch through marriage with Maria Palaiologina Kantakouzene, Michael Asen II's mother, who married him on the condition that Michael Asen II's rights continued to be respected. Escaped to the Golden Horde in exile after Ivan Asen III took control of Bulgaria. Killed by Nogai Khan after requests from the Byzantines.
	Ivan Asen III; Иван Асен	1279–1280 (1 year)	Son of Mitso Asen. Supported as puppet emperor of Bulgaria by the Byzantine emperor Michael VIII Palaiologos, against Ivaylo and Michael Asen II. Took control of Bulgaria with the help of the Byzantine army. Fled to the Byzantine Empire after a brief reign due to fearing the ambitions of the aristocrat George Terter, whereafter the Bulgarians proclaimed George Terter emperor in his stead.

=== House of Terter (1280–1292, first time) ===
Image	Name	Reign	Succession and notes
	George Terter I Георги Тертер	1280–1292 (12 years)	Leading member of the Bulgarian aristocracy. Wishing to safeguard the position of Ivan Asen III, the Byzantine emperor Michael VIII Palaiologos arranged for George Terter to divorce his wife and marry Kira Maria Asenina (Ivan Asen III's sister). Despite this, George Terter plotted against Ivan Asen III, who eventually fled to the Byzantines. The Bulgarians thereafter proclaimed George Terter emperor. Overthrown by Nogai Khan of the Golden Horde and fled to Byzantium.

=== House of Smilets (1292–1299) ===
Image	Name	Reign	Succession and notes
	Smilets; Смилец	1292–1298 (6 years)	Member of a prominent Bulgarian noble family though without known connections to previous Bulgarian royalty. Husband of Smiltsena Palaiologina, a niece of the Byzantine emperor Michael VIII Palaiologos. Made emperor of Bulgaria (as a puppet ruler) by Nogai Khan of the Golden Horde.
	Ivan II (Note: Sometimes referred to as Ivan IV Smilets, numbered after Ivan Asen I–III (then considered Ivan I–III) and not counting Kaloyan as Ivan I nor counting Ivan Vladislav. The rulers named Ivan Asen however used that name as a double name and are more appropriately numbered as such; Ivan Vladislav also used a double name. The combination Ivan Smilets for this ruler is modern and does not occur in any contemporary sources.); Иван	1298–1299 (1 year)	Son of Smilets. Underage at the time of his accession, Ivan II briefly succeeded his father before being deposed after Chaka's invasion of Bulgaria. Later lived out his life in exile in the Byzantine Empire. Due to the small number of sources (two documents) some historians have disputed whether Ivan II actually reigned.

=== House of Borjigin (1299–1300) ===
Image	Name	Reign	Succession and notes
	Chaka; Чака	1299–1300 (1 year)	Son-in-law of George Terter I and son of Nogai Khan of the Golden Horde. Invaded Bulgaria, assisted by Theodore Svetoslav (a son of George Terter I). Proclaimed himself as emperor of Bulgaria and achieved some recognition with Svetoslav's help. Came into conflict with the Golden Horde khan Toqta and then overthrown and strangled by Svetoslav. Some historians have argued that Chaka was never emperor of Bulgaria, but merely dominated it through his brother-in-law Theodore Svetoslav.

=== House of Terter (1300–1323, second time) ===
Image	Name	Reign	Succession and notes
	Theodore Svetoslav; Тодор Светослав	1300–1322 (22 years)	Son of George Terter I; previously junior co-emperor c. 1285–1292. Overthrew and strangled Chaka, with support from Toqta of the Golden Horde. Ended the period of Mongol dominion over Bulgaria and waged wars against both the Byzantine Empire and various autonomous Bulgarian nobles. Mostly successful; succeeding in reconsolidating the empire.
	George Terter II; Георги Тертер	1322–1323 (1 year)	Son of Theodore Svetoslav; previously junior co-emperor c. 1321–1322. Intervened in the Byzantine civil war of 1321–1328 and spent much of his brief reign warring with the Byzantines, for instance recapturing Plovdiv. His death marked the extinction of the direct Terter line.

=== House of Shishman (1323–1331) ===
Image	Name	Reign	Succession and notes
	Michael Asen III (Note: Many sources erroneously refer to this emperor as Michael III Shishman. His regnal name, attested in both Bulgarian and Byzantine sources, was the double name Michael Asen. The designation "Michael Shishman" (which connects him to his father Shishman of Vidin) is not attested in contemporary sources.); Михаил Асен	1323–1330 (7 years)	Matrilineal great-grandson of Ivan Asen II. Previously semi-independent despot of Vidin. Elected as emperor by the Bulgarian nobility after George Terter II's death due to being considered the strongest local candidate. Retook some territory that had been lost to the Byzantines during the brief interregnum before his election.
	Ivan Stephen; Иван Стефан	1330–1331 (1 year)	Son of Michael Asen III; previously junior co-emperor c. 1323–1324. Deposed after a brief reign in favour of his cousin Ivan Alexander in a coup d'état headed by elements of the Bulgarian nobility. After his deposition, Ivan Stephen fled to Serbia and then to the Byzantine Empire.

=== House of Sratsimir (1331–1422) ===
The rulers of the House of Sratsimir, patrilineal descendants of the despot Sratsimir, are in lists of monarchs often designated as part of the Shishmanid dynasty, with which they only share matrilineal descent. Through their matrilineal descent from the House of Shishman, the rulers of the House of Sratsimir were also descendants of the House of Asen.

Image	Name	Reign	Succession and notes
	Ivan Alexander Asen; Иван Александър Асен	1331–1371 (40 years)	Son of Keratsa Petritsa, a sister of Michael Asen III. Proclaimed emperor following a coup d'état headed by elements of the Bulgarian nobility. Allied with Stefan Dušan of the Serbian Empire, who was eclipsing Bulgaria's power. Managed to capture some territories from the Byzantine Empire. Divided the empire among his sons to avoid succession problems, leading to Bulgaria's fragmentation. Allied with the Ottoman Turks against the Byzantines, inadvertently accelerating the Ottoman conquest of the Balkans.
	Michael Asen IV; Михаил Асен (Junior co-ruler)	Never ruled in his own right	Eldest son of Ivan Alexander; junior co-emperor c. 1332–1355. Led an army in the defense against an Ottoman invasion in 1354–1355, during which he was killed in battle near Sofia.
	Ivan Asen IV; Иван Асен (Junior co-ruler)	Never ruled in his own right	Son of Ivan Alexander; junior co-emperor c. 1337–1349. Led an army in the defense against an Ottoman invasion in 1349, during which he was killed in battle near Sofia.
	Ivan Sratsimir; Иван Срацимир (Ruling in Vidin)	1356–c. 1397 (c. 41 years)	Son of Ivan Alexander; previously junior co-emperor c. 1337–1356. Granted Vidin and the surrounding lands by his father as autonomous emperor while his younger brother Ivan Shishman inherited Tarnovo. Immediately tried to take control of all of Bulgaria after his father's death, though was defeated by Ivan Shishman. The Vidin empire was largely conquered by the Ottoman Empire in 1396/1397 and Ivan Sratsimir was deposed and taken prisoner.
	Ivan Shishman; Иван Шишман (Ruling in Tarnovo)	1371–1395 (24 years)	Son of Ivan Alexander; previously junior co-emperor c. 1356–1371. Made the heir to Tarnovo over the elder Ivan Sratsimir due to the influence of his mother Sarah-Theodora. Fought off Ivan Sratsimir's attempt at capturing Tarnovo. Made a vassal of the Ottoman Empire. Tried to gain Hungarian aid to reassert his independence, which led to the Ottomans invading his lands. Tarnovo and most of Bulgaria was captured in 1393, followed by Nikopol and Ivan Shishman's other remaining territory in 1395. Allegedly murdered by the Ottomans after the capture of Nikopol.
	Ivan Asen V Иван Асен (Junior co-ruler)	Never ruled in his own right	Son of Ivan Alexander; junior co-emperor 1356–c. 1388. Recorded to have presided over church synods at Tarnovo (1360) together with his father and Ivan Shishman.
Bulgaria was conquered by the Ottoman Empire in the Bulgarian–Ottoman wars (1345–1396), resulting in the fall of the Second Bulgarian Empire
	Constantine II; Константин (Note: All known contemporary documents refer to Constantine II merely by the name Constantine. It is possible that he (like Constantine I) used the double name Constantine Asen, especially given that Asen was incorporated into the double names of three of his uncles. None of the surviving documents are from Constantine's chancery and no known seals or charters exist, making it impossible to confirm this hypothesis.) (Ruling in Vidin)	c. 1397–1422 (c. 25 years)	Son of Ivan Sratsimir; previously junior co-emperor c. 1395–1397. Remained in control of at least some parts of his father's domains around Vidin, probably initially as an Ottoman vassal, for most of the time until his death in 1422.

== Pretenders during Ottoman rule (1422–1878) ==
Following the gradual conquest of Bulgaria in the 14th and 15th centuries, the Ottomans incorporated the Bulgarian lands into the vast province of Rumelia. In the late 16th century, the new province of Silistra was created due to persistent northern attacks from the Cossacks. Later on, much of modern-day northern Bulgaria was organized into the Danube vilayet, which in terms of borders closely corresponded to the succeeding autonomous Principality of Bulgaria. Like under the period of Byzantine rule, the Ottoman authorities were sometimes faced with Bulgarian uprisings aimed at independence, at times also involving the proclamation of new Bulgarian monarchs.

Image	Name	Reign	Succession and notes
	Fruzhin; Фружин	1422–1460 (38 years)	Son of Ivan Shishman. Fled to Hungary after the fall of the Second Bulgarian Empire, where he was made the ruler of the County of Temes. His titular claim to the Bulgarian throne was recognized by the Hungarian king Sigismund (1387–1437). Fruzhin was counted as emperor in some later Bulgarian sources.
	Ivan Shishman II (Note: Enumerated after Ivan Shishman (1371–1395). He is sometimes alternatively referred to as Shishman II, or (also counting Shishman of Vidin, who did not reign as tsar) as Ivan Shishman III or Shishman III.); Иван Шишман	1598 (less than a year)	Allegedly a descendant of the House of Sratsimir. Proclaimed tsar during the First Tarnovo Uprising (1598) and briefly ruled at Tarnovo. The first attempt at mass liberation in Bulgaria, this uprising was eventually crushed by the Ottomans.
	Rostislav Stratimirovic; Ростислав Стратимирович	1686 (less than a year)	Allegedly a descendant of the House of Sratsimir. Proclaimed knyaz (prince) during the Second Tarnovo Uprising (1686). Hoped to gain support from the Tsardom of Russia, though the uprising began prematurely and was crushed by the Ottomans.

== Principality (1878–1908) and Kingdom of Bulgaria (1908–1946) ==
=== House of Battenberg (1879–1886) ===
Image	Name	Reign	Succession and notes
	Alexander I Александър I	29 April 1879 – 7 September 1886 (7 years and 131 days)	A new Bulgarian state was established through the treaties of San Stefano and Berlin (1878) following the Russo-Turkish War of 1877–1878. The first National Assembly elected (Note: Alexander I was not the only choice proposed for the first modern Bulgarian monarch. The Russian prince Alexander Mikhailovich Dondukov-Korsakov (1820–1893), who headed the Russian administration in Bulgaria at the time, put himself forth for the position though was rejected. The Congress of Berlin decided that no Russian or Bulgarian should be allowed to become Prince of Bulgaria. In addition to Alexander, other European royalty considered included Prince Valdemar of Denmark, Prince Henry XXV of Reuss, and Prince Carol of Romania. Alexander was ultimately selected by the Bulgarian parliament due to having served in the Russo-Turkish War, his close relationship with (and endorsement by) Alexander II of Russia, and his known conservative political stance.) Alexander of Battenberg, a German prince, as monarch. Since Bulgaria was stipulated to remain an autonomous vassal state of the Ottoman Empire, Alexander used the title knyaz (prince) rather than tsar. Deposed in a coup led by pro-Russian army officers. Briefly reinstated following a counter-coup before abdicating the throne.

=== House of Saxe-Coburg and Gotha (1887–1946) ===
Image	Name	Reign	Succession and notes
	Ferdinand I Фердинанд I	7 July 1887 – 3 October 1918 (31 years and 87 days)	Chosen as knyaz (prince) after Prince Valdemar of Denmark declined the throne after being approached. Secured Bulgaria's complete independence from the Ottoman Empire in 1908, whereafter he adopted the style of tsar (king). Leading figure in the First Balkan War (1912–1913) though Bulgaria's actions after victory led to the Second Balkan War (1913) which deprived the country of most of its gains. Aligned with the German Empire in World War I (1914–1918) and was forced to abdicate after the war's conclusion.
	Boris III; Борѝс III	3 October 1918 – 28 August 1943 (24 years and 330 days)	Son of Ferdinand I. Succeeded to the throne after his father's abdication. Bestowed near-dictatorial powers by a pro-monarchical regime in 1935. Aligned with Nazi Germany during World War II (1939–1945), mainly out of a desire to increase Bulgarian territory. Bulgaria participated in the invasions of Yugoslavia and Greece, though Boris refused to send Bulgarian soldiers to aid the German invasion of Russia. His government oversaw the Holocaust in Bulgaria. (Note: After the conclusion of World War II, royalists and nationalists began to hail Boris as a "rescuer of the Bulgarian Jews", though scholars consider this a dubious honour. Under Boris III's regime, thousands of Jews were deported to Germany from Bulgarian-occupied lands in Thrace and Macedonia, resulting in 11,343 deaths. It was further intended to also deport the Jews of Bulgaria proper, though the regime abandoned these plans following intense public outcry. 48,000 Jews of Bulgaria's pre-war territory consequently survived the Holocaust, though were subjected to other forms of discrimination, including being forbidden from holding public office, forcible internal deportation, and dispossession. Bulgaria was the only country to sign a written agreement "to supply Jews to Germany". Romani people were also subject to discrimination, being forced to register for forced labor and being barred from marrying Bulgarians.) Died in mysterious circumstances shortly after a visit to Adolf Hitler.
	Simeon II; Симеон II	28 August 1943 – 15 September 1946 (3 years and 18 days)	Son of Boris III. Underage at the time of his accession and thus placed under a regency for the entire duration of his reign, until the Bulgarian monarchy was abolished through a referendum by Georgi Dimitrov's communist government. Went to exile in Spain and later returned to Bulgaria as a politician. Has never formally renounced his claim to the throne. (Note: Simeon operating as a politician within the Bulgarian republican framework and swearing allegiance to the republic has however been interpreted as effectively rejecting the restitution of the monarchy.) Simeon's party NDSV was victorious in the 2001 Bulgarian parliamentary election and Simeon served as Prime Minister of Bulgaria 2001–2005.

== Family trees ==
Simplified family tree of the monarchs of the First Bulgarian Empire (803–1018) (Note: Omitting earlier monarchs since their family relationships are too uncertain to construct a family tree)

Krum; 803–814	Dukum; 814	Ditzeng; 814–815
Omurtag; 815–831
Zvinitsa	Malamir; 831–836
Presian I 836–852
Boris I 852–889
Vladimir; 889–893	Simeon I 893–927
Peter I 927–969
Boris II; 969–977	Roman; 977–997	Samuel; 997–1014	Aron
Gavril Radomir; 1014–1015	Ivan Vladislav; 1015–1018
Presian II	Alusian

Simplified family tree of the monarchs of the Second Bulgarian Empire (1185–1422)

Ivan Asen I 1188–1196	Peter II; 1185–1197	Kaloyan; 1196–1207	[Sister]
Ivan Asen II; 1218–1241	Alexander	Boril; 1207–1218
Elena	Kaliman Asen I 1241–1246	Michael Asen I 1246–1256	Irene	Constantine	Anna-Teodora	Maria	Mitso Asen; 1256–1263	Kaliman Asen II; 1256
Irene	Constantine I 1257–1277	Maria	Ivaylo; 1278–1279	Smiltsena	Smilets; 1292–1298	[Daughter]	Ivan Asen III; 1279–1280	Kira Maria	George Terter I 1280–1292	Maria
Michael Asen II; 1277–1279	Ivan II; 1298–1299	Michael Asen III; 1323–1330	Keratsa Petritsa	Theodore Svetoslav; 1300–1322	Elena	Chaka; 1299–1300
Ivan Stephen; 1330–1331	Ivan Alexander; 1331–1371	George Terter II; 1322–1323
Michael Asen IV co-ruler	Ivan Sratsimir; 1356–1397	Ivan Asen IV co-ruler	Ivan Shishman; 1371–1395	Ivan Asen V co-ruler
Constantine II; 1397–1422	Fruzhin

Simplified family tree of the monarchs of the Principality (1878–1908) and Kingdom (1908–1946) of Bulgaria

Alexander I 1879–1886

Ferdinand I 1886–1918
Boris III; 1918–1943
Simeon II; 1943–1946

== See also ==
- History of Bulgaria
- List of heads of state of Bulgaria
- List of heads of government of Bulgaria
- Coronation of the Bulgarian monarch
- List of Bulgarian royal consorts
- List of rulers of Volga Bulgaria
