= Kira Maria Asenina of Bulgaria =

Kira Maria

Empress consort of Bulgaria
- Tenure: 1280–1283
- Born: Unknown
- Died: Unknown; Byzantine Empire
- Spouse: George I of Bulgaria
- Issue: Ana Terter?
- House: House of Asen; House of Terter
- Father: Mitso Asen of Bulgaria
- Mother: Maria Asenina of Bulgaria

Kira Maria Asenina (Bulgarian: Кира-Мария Асенина) was a Bulgarian princess and empress consort (tsarina), second wife of George I of Bulgaria. She was the daughter of tsar Mitso Asen of Bulgaria and his wife Maria. The dates and the places of her birth and death are unknown.

== History ==
Through her mother, Kira Maria was a granddaughter of Ivan Asen II of Bulgaria and Irene Komnene of Epirus. She was also the sister of tsar Ivan Asen III, who seized the Bulgarian throne in 1280 with Byzantine support.

She married the Bulgaro-Cuman nobleman George Terter in a marriage arranged by her brother in order to strengthen his position. George divorced his first wife, Maria, and sent her and their son, Theodore Svetoslav, as hostages to the Byzantine Empire. He was accordingly made a despotēs, the highest rank in the Byzantino-Bulgarian court hierarchy, and Kira Maria was granted the title of despoina.

Ivan Asen III failed to assert himself throughout the country and he secretly fled Tarnovo in 1280 and escaped to the Byzantine Empire. George Terter seized the throne and Kira Maria was proclaimed the new tsarina.

However, she was very unpopular in Tarnovo, because of her deposed brother. Her marriage also proved to be controversial as Maria Terter was still alive in Constantinople. According to the Bulgarian Orthodox Church George's first marriage was still valid and Kira Maria was his uncanonical wife. Patriarch Yoakim III of Bulgaria threatened to excommunicate the couple and insisted that he would not relent until George I Terter put away Kira Maria. The tsar re-opened negotiations with the Byzantine Empire and sought the return of Maria, what he eventually accomplished in a treaty in which Maria and Kira Maria exchanged places as empress and hostage.

== Children ==
According to Georgius Pachymeres Ana Terter, wife of Serbian king Stefan Uroš II Milutin, was the daughter of Kira Maria and George Terter.

== Ancestors ==
Tsar Mitso Asen of Bulgaria
Kira Maria Asenina
Tsar Ivan Asen I of Bulgaria
Tsar Ivan Asen II Bulgaria
Elena-Evgenia
Princess Maria Asenina of Bulgaria
Despot Theodore Komnenos of Epirus
Princess Irene Komnene of Bulgaria
Maria Petraliphaina

== Sources ==
- Pavlov, Plamen, "Търновските царици". ДАР-РХ, 2006.

Kira Maria Asenina of Bulgaria Asen dynasty Born: ? Died: ?
Royal titles
Preceded by Irene Palaiologina of the Byzantine Empire	Empress consort of Bulgaria; 1280–1283	Succeeded by Maria
