= Irene Komnene Doukaina =

Irene
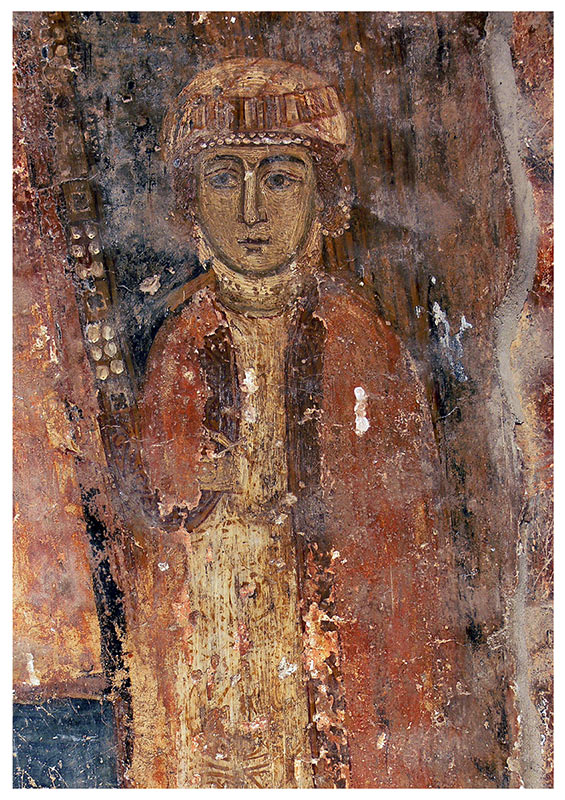
- Fresco of Irene at the Church of the Archangel of the Metropolis in Kastoria

Empress consort of Bulgaria
- Tenure: 1238–1241
- Born: Unknown
- Spouse: Ivan Asen II of Bulgaria
- Issue: Anna (or Theodora), Maria, Michael Asen I
- Dynasty: Komnenos Doukas
- Father: Theodore Komnenos Doukas
- Mother: Maria Petraliphaina

Irene Komnene Doukaina or Eirene Komnene Doukaina (Greek: Ειρήνη Κομνηνή Δούκαινα, Bulgarian: Ирина Комнина Дукина) was an Empress of Bulgaria during the Second Bulgarian Empire and Byzantine princess. She was the third wife of tsar Ivan Asen II of Bulgaria. She was the mother of tsar Michael Asen I of Bulgaria.

== Life ==
Irene was daughter of Theodore Komnenos Doukas, ruler of Epirus and then Emperor of Thessalonica, and Maria Petraliphaina (sister of the sebastokrator John Petraliphas). In 1230 Irene and her family were captured by the troops of tsar Ivan Asen II of Bulgaria in the battle of Klokotnitsa and they were taken in Tarnovo, where Irene grew up in the Palace. Irene became known for her beauty and the widowed tsar fell in love with her. They married in 1237. According to a Byzantine author, Ivan Asen II loved Irene "no less than Antony loved Cleopatra", and she may have been his mistress for some years before their marriage in 1237. By marrying Irene, Ivan Asen II would have broken church canons, as his daughter, Maria Asanina Komnena, from his marriage to Anna (Anisia) was married to Irene's uncle, Manuel of Thessalonica. There is some evidence that the Bulgarian church opposed the marriage and that a patriarch (called either Spiridon or Vissarion) was deposed or executed by the irate tsar.

Irene and Ivan Asen II had three children:

1. Anna (or Theodora), who married the sebastokrator Peter before 1253.
2. Maria, who married Mitso Asen, who succeeded as emperor of Bulgaria 1256–1257.
3. Michael Asen I, who succeeded as emperor of Bulgaria (1246–1256).

In 1241 Ivan Asen II died and he was succeeded by Kaliman I of Bulgaria, his son by his second wife Anna Maria of Hungary. Kaliman I was poisoned in 1246 and the throne went to Michael II Asen, the son of Irene. According to one theory Irene poisoned her stepson in order to secure the throne for Michael II. It is assumed that Irene took over the government as tsarina-regent because her son was still a child when he ascended the throne, but there is little evidence to prove this hypothesis.

Irene retired to a monastery under the monastic name Xenia. She was expelled from Bulgaria after the death of her son in 1256 and spent the rest of her life in her family's land around Thessaloniki.

== Sources ==
- Андреев (Andreev), Йордан (Jordan); Лалков (Lalkov), Милчо (Milcho) (1996). Българските ханове и царе (The Bulgarian Khans and Tsars) (in Bulgarian). Велико Търново (Veliko Tarnovo): Абагар (Abagar). ISBN 954-427-216-X.
- Андреев (Andreev), Йордан (Jordan); Лазаров (Lazarov), Иван (Ivan); Павлов (Pavlov), Пламен (Plamen) (2012). Кой кой е в средновековна България [Who is Who in Medieval Bulgaria] (in Bulgarian). Изток Запад (Iztok Zapad). ISBN 978-619-152-012-1.

Irene Komnene Doukaina Komnenodoukas dynasty; Asen dynasty Born: 1220 Died: ?
Royal titles
Preceded by Anna Maria of Hungary	Empress consort of Bulgaria; 1238–1241	Succeeded by Elizabeth Rostislavna
