= Anna-Teodora =

Bulgarian princess

Anna or Theodora, inaccurately designated "Anna-Theodora" in historiography (Bulgarian: Анна-Теодора, Anna-Teodora; 13th century) was a Bulgarian princess and daughter of Emperor Ivan Asen II (r. 1218–1241) and Irene Komnene. A child of her father's third marriage, she was born sometime between 1238 and 1241. Through her mother, Anna/Theodora was a granddaughter of Emperor Theodore Komnenos Doukas of Thessalonica (r. 1215–1230, d. after 1253) and Maria Petraliphaina.

The children of Ivan Asen II and Irene Komnene are named twice by George Akropolites, in one place as Michael, Theodora, and Maria, in another as Michael, Maria, and Anna. Ivan Božilov persuasively identified Anna and Theodora as the same daughter, but his reference to her as "Anna-Theodora" has created the misleading impression that she bore a double name. The conclusion — and the dubious usage — has been followed by most scholars.

The sources name two sons-in-law of Ivan Asen II among the Bulgarian aristocracy, the sebastokrator Peter and the future emperor Mitso Asen (r. 1256–1257). They seem to have married Ivan Asen II's daughters by Irene Komnene, but no source provides the names of their respective wives. The renowned Bulgarian historian Vasil Zlatarski, without much rationale, assigned Anna/Theodora as the wife of Peter and Maria as the wife of Mitso Asen. Since Božilov adopted this solution, albeit without much conviction, this had become the common assumption in Bulgarian historiography. Considering onomastic patterns and the implication of the names of Peter and Mitso Asen's descendants, Ian Mladjov argued that the opposite arrangement, with Maria marrying Peter and Anna/Theodora marrying Mitso Asen, is more likely and preferable.

The wife of sebastokrator Peter, traditionally identified as Anna/Theodora but perhaps more likely Maria, had an unnamed daughter, who married despotes Shishman of Vidin and founded the Shishman branch of the Asenid dynasty. She was thus the grandmother of Emperor Michael Asen III "Shishman" (r. 1323–1330) and great-grandmother of Emperor Ivan Alexander of Bulgaria (r. 1331–1371). On the other hand, the wife of Mitso Asen, traditionally identified as Maria but perhaps more likely Anna/Theodora, was the mother of Emperor Ivan Asen III of Bulgaria (r. 1279–1280) and of Maria, the second wife of Emperor George Terter I of Bulgaria (r. 1280–1292), and the ancestress of the Byzantine branch of the Asenid dynasty.

== Sources ==
- Andreev, Jordan, et al., Koj koj e v srednovekovna Bălgarija, 3rd ed., Sofia, 2012.
- Božilov, Ivan, Familijata na Asenevci (1186–1460), Sofia, 1985.
- Fine, John Van Antwerp, The Late Medieval Balkans: A Critical Survey from the Late Twelfth Century to the Ottoman Conquest, Ann Arbor, 1987.
- Macrides, Ruth, transl., George Akropolites, The History, Oxford, 2007.
- Mladjov, Ian, "The Children of Ivan Asen II and Eirēnē Komnēnē," Bulgaria Mediaevalis 3 (2012) 403-418 online
- Zlatarski, Vasil, Istorija na bălgarskata dăržava prez srednite vekove 3: Vtoro Bălgarsko Carstvo: Bălgarija pri Asenevci (1187–1280), Sofia, 1940.
