= Mitso Asen of Bulgaria =

Tsar of Bulgaria from 1256 to 1257

Mitso Asen
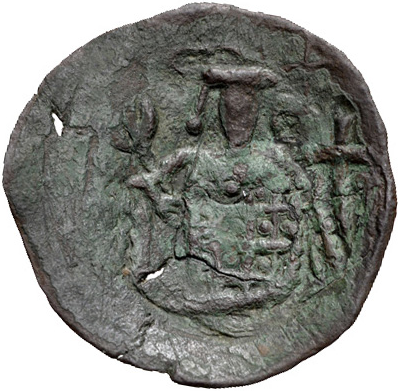
- Coin attributed to Mitso Asen

Tsar of Bulgaria
- Reign: 1256–1257
- Predecessor: Kaliman Asen II
- Successor: Constantine Tikh Asen
- Died: Before 1277/78
- Spouse: Maria or Anna/Theodora
- Issue: Ivan Asen III; Maria

Mitso Asen (Bulgarian: Мицо Асен, Mico Asen), not Micho Asen (Мичо Асен, Mičo Asen), in Greek, Μύτζης, Mytzēs, was the tsar of Bulgaria from 1256 until 1257.

== Reign ==
Mitso Asen ascended the throne by virtue of his marriage to a daughter of Ivan Asen II of Bulgaria by Irene Komnene of Epirus. The name of his wife is nowhere specified; she has been traditionally identified as Maria, but was perhaps more likely Anna/Theodora. The dates of his birth and death are unknown, and his antecedents are unclear, but neither his name (which is found in official contexts and is not the diminutive of "Michael"), nor his career described in the Byzantine sources allow an identification with Michael, the son of the Rus' prince and Hungarian Ban Rostislav Mikhailovich, nor any other member of the house of Chernigov. It is likely that, like his successor Constantine, the son of Tikh, Mitso Asen adopted the name Asen after his accession to the throne.

He proclaimed himself emperor of Bulgaria after the murder of his wife's cousin, Kaliman Asen II, in 1256. Although he might have acquired some support in the capital Tarnovo and possibly in Preslav, he was faced by the hostility of much of the provincial nobility. Indeed, it is unclear to what extent he was able to assert and maintain his control over the capital. Following an obscure unsuccessful campaign against Theodore II Lascaris of the Empire of Nicaea, Mitso lost control even over the commoners.

When the nobility proclaimed Constantine Asen I emperor instead, Mitso Asen and his family fled the capital in 1257 and attempted to resist from Preslav and then Mesembria (now Nesebar). Duting the Byzantine campaigns in Bulgaria, in exchange for asylum and lands, he turned over Mesembria and its environs to Emperor Michael VIII Palaiologos in 1261 or 1263 and sought refuge in Nicaea. He was given lands in the Troad, where he remained with his family, becoming the ancestor of the Byzantine branch of the Asenid dynasty. The date of his death is unknown, but it is likely that he was no longer alive in 1277/1278, when his son Ivan Asen III was put forward as a claimant to the Bulgarian throne by the Byzantine Emperor Michael VIII.

The ample coinage attributed to Mitso Asen in earlier literature has been reassigned to his brother-in-law and predecessor Michael Asen I by Tenčo Popov.

== Family ==
By his marriage to Maria or Anna/Theodora of Bulgaria, Mitso had two known children:

1. Ivan Asen III, emperor (tsar) of Bulgaria 1279–1280.
2. Kira Maria, who married George Terter I of Bulgaria, emperor of Bulgaria 1280–1292.

== Sources ==
- Andreev, Jordan, et al., Koj koj e v srednovekovna Bălgarija, 3rd ed., Sofia, 2012.
- Božilov, Ivan, Familijata na Asenevci (1186–1460), Sofia, 1985.
- Fine, John Van Antwerp, The Late Medieval Balkans: A Critical Survey from the Late Twelfth Century to the Ottoman Conquest, Ann Arbor, 1987.
- Mladjov, Ian, "The Children of Ivan Asen II and Eirēnē Komnēnē," Bulgaria Mediaevalis 3 (2012) 403-418 online
- Mladjov, Ian, "Monarchs' Names and Numbering in the Second Bulgarian State," Studia Ceranea 5 (2015) 267-310 online.
- Popov, Tenčo, Studii vǎrhu bǎlgarskoto srednovekovno monetosečene s izvodi za istorijata, Sofia, 2020.
- Zlatarski, Vasil, Istorija na bălgarskata dăržava prez srednite vekove 3: Vtoro Bălgarsko Carstvo: Bălgarija pri Asenevci (1187–1280), Sofia, 1940.

| Preceded by Kaliman Asen II | Tsar of Bulgaria; 1256–1257 | Succeeded by Constantine Asen I |
