= Anna (Anisia) =

Anisia

Empress consort of the Second Bulgarian Empire
- Tenure: 1218-1221
- Born: Анна; 12. century
- Died: 1221
- Spouse: Ivan Asen II
- Issue: Maria Asanina Komnena; Beloslava of Bulgaria

Anna (Bulgarian: Анна), subsequently known under the religious name Anisia (Анисия), was the first wife of Tsar Ivan Asen II of Bulgaria (r. 1218–1241) and empress consort of the Second Bulgarian Empire from 1218 to 1221. She was exiled to a monastery in the beginning of Ivan Asen's reign, after he arranged his marriage to Anna Maria of Hungary. From his marriage to Anna, Ivan Asen had two children.

== Biography ==
Ivan Asen's marriage to Anna dates to his exile in Rus', the period before his forceful accession to his ancestral throne of Bulgaria in 1218. In all likelihood, Anna was betrothed to Ivan Asen so that he could receive Rus' assistance in taking the throne. According to the account of Byzantine historian George Akropolites, Anna was a concubine rather than a legitimate wife of Ivan Asen. However, Bulgarian historian Ivan Bozhilov believes this to be a result of Akropolites' poor information.

Anna's actual time as empress was rather short-lived. Not long after taking the throne in 1218, Ivan Asen arranged his politically motivated marriage to Hungarian princess Anna Maria, daughter of King Andrew II (r. 1205–1235). Ivan Asen effectively demanded the marriage by prohibiting Andrew and his forces from passing through Bulgarian territory on their way back from the Fifth Crusade. After the future marriage of Ivan Asen and Anna Maria was settled, his first wife Anna was retired to a monastery and became a nun under the name Anisia. In a later Bulgarian Orthodox text, she was praised as an Orthodox empress of Bulgaria. Ivan Asen married Anna Maria three years later, in 1221, because the marriage required the personal approval of the Pope. As common with ex-consorts, Ivan Asen's first wife finished her life exiled to a monastery.

== Family ==
By her marriage to Ivan Asen, Anna gave birth to two daughters. The eldest, Maria Asanina Komnena, was wife of Manuel Komnenos Doukas, ruler of Thessalonica from 1230 to 1237. Another daughter of Anna, tentatively known as Beloslava, was married to Serbian king Stephen Vladislav I (r. 1234–1243).
