= Ivan Asen III =

Tsar of Bulgaria from 1279 to 1280

Tsar of Bulgaria
- Reign: 1279–1280
- Predecessor: Ivailo
- Successor: Georgi Terter I
- Born: c. 1259/1260
- Died: 1303
- Spouse: Irene Palaiologina
- Issue: Andronikos Asen
- Father: Mitso Asen
- Mother: Maria Asenina of Bulgaria

Ivan Asen III (Bulgarian: Иван Асен III, also Йоан Асен III, Ioan Asen III, and in English John Asen III), ruled as tsar of Bulgaria 1279–1280. Ivan Asen III was the son of Mitso Asen of Bulgaria and Maria of Bulgaria, a daughter of Ivan Asen II of Bulgaria and Irene of Thessalonica. He was probably born in about 1259/60, and died in exile in 1303.

Fearing the rapid success of Ivaylo of Bulgaria, the Byzantine Emperor Michael VIII Palaiologos summoned Ivan Asen to his court, granted him the title of despotēs, and married him to his eldest daughter Irene Palaiologina in 1277 or 1278. Michael VIII then sent several Byzantine armies to attempt to assert Ivan Asen III on the throne of Bulgaria. Although Ivailo defeated several of these attempts, he was blockaded for three months in Drăstăr (Silistra) by the Mongol allies of Michael VIII. In the interval a Byzantine force besieged the Bulgarian capital Tarnovo and, hearing a rumor of Ivailo's death in battle, the local nobility surrendered and accepted Ivan Asen III as emperor in 1279.

To strengthen his position in Tarnovo, Ivan Asen III married his sister Maria (Kira Maria) to the Bulgaro-Cuman nobleman George Terter, but failed to assert himself throughout the country. Ivailo reappeared before the walls of the capital and defeated two Byzantine attempts to relieve Ivan Asen III. Despairing of success, Ivan Asen III and Irene Palaiologina secretly fled Tarnovo with choice treasures from the palace treasury, including pieces captured from defeated Byzantine Emperors in former victories. Reaching Mesembria (Nesebar), the imperial couple sailed for Constantinople, where the enraged Michael VIII refused to receive them for days for their cowardice.

In 1280 or 1281 Ivan Asen III traveled to the Golden Horde, competing with Ivailo in a bid to win support for restoration in Bulgaria. The Mongol chieftain Nogai Khan eventually had Ivailo murdered, but failed to restore Ivan Asen III in Bulgaria. The latter returned to his family possessions in the Troad, and died in 1303.

== Family ==
Ivan Asen III and Irene Palaiologina became the progenitors of the large and influential family Asan (or Asanes) in the Byzantine Empire, which prospered in various court and provincial offices until the end of the empire and its dependencies in the mid-15th century. One of Ivan Asen III's descendants, Irene Asanina (daughter of his son Andronikos Asan) married the future Byzantine Emperor John VI Kantakouzenos and through their daughter Helena (who married emperor John V Palaiologos), became the ancestress of later Byzantine emperors.

By his marriage with Irene Palaiologina, Ivan Asen III had the following children:

1. Michael Asen, titular emperor of Bulgaria.
2. Andronikos Asen, father of Irene Asanina, wife of John VI Kantakouzenos.
3. Isaac Asen.
4. Manuel Asen.
5. Constantine Asen.
6. Theodora Asenina, who married Fernan Jimenez d'Aunez and then Manuel Tagaris.
7. Maria Asenina, who married Roger de Flor.

== Sources ==
- John V.A. Fine, Jr., The Late Medieval Balkans, Ann Arbor, 1987.

Preceded by Ivailo	Tsar of Bulgaria; 1279–1280	Succeeded by George Terter I
