= Church of the Archangel of the Metropolis =

Church building in Kastoria, Greece

Coordinates: 40°30′57″N 21°16′06″E

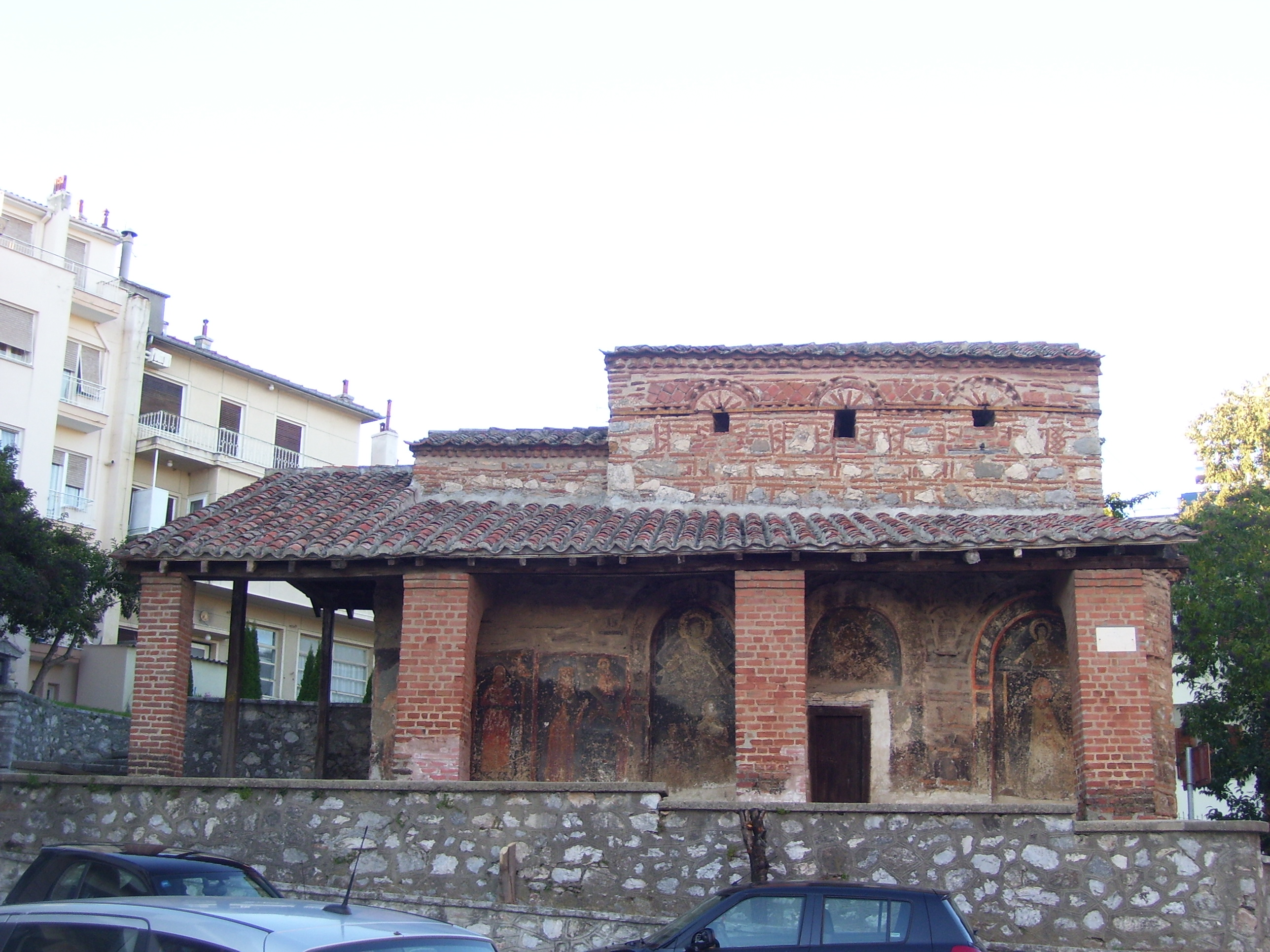
The church in 2010

The Church of the Archangel of the Metropolis or Taxiarchis of the Metropolis (Greek: Ιερός Ναός Ταξιάρχη Μητροπόλεως) is a Byzantine church in the medieval old city of Kastoria, in northern Greece. Dedicated to the Archangel Michael, it was built in the 9th or 10th century. The use of ancient spolia indicates that it was possibly built on the remains of an early Christian basilica. The church is a small three-aisled basilica, with a narthex and a dome, added after the original construction was finished. A few traces of its original fresco decoration show similarities with the art of Cappadocia, but are too fragmentary to draw any conclusions. The current fresco series dates from the renovation of the church in 1359/60, and represent a distinctive regional style evident in other churches in Kastoria, but also Ohrid.

In the 20th century, the remains of the Greek national hero of the Macedonian Struggle, Pavlos Melas, and his wife Natalia, were placed in a tomb inside the church.
