= Asen dynasty =

Dynasty in medieval Bulgaria, 1185–1280

Coat of arms of Tsar Ivan Asen II

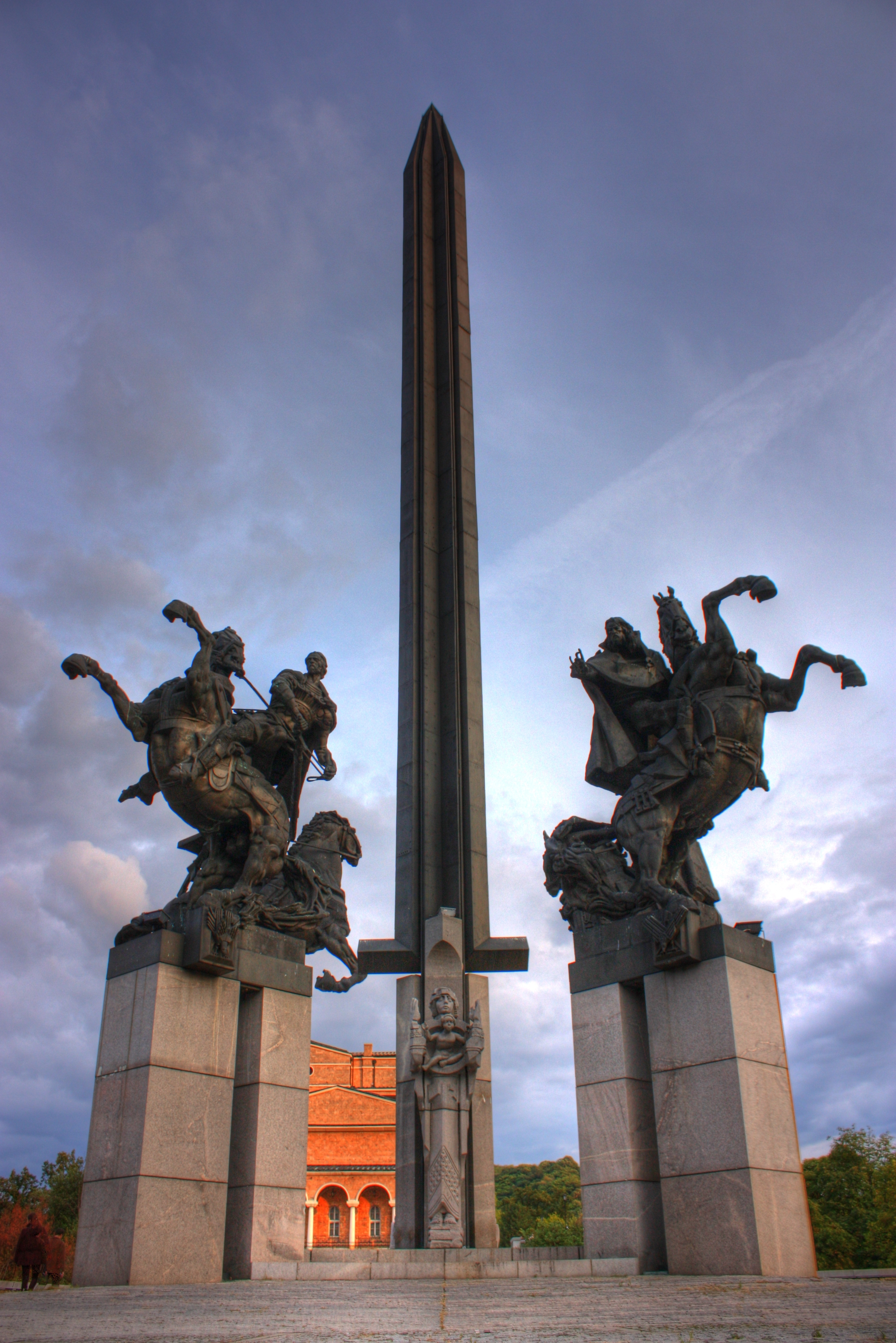
Monument to the Asen dynasty in their capital Veliko Tarnovo, Bulgaria, sculptor prof. Krum Damianov

The House of Asen, also Asen dynasty or the Asenids (Bulgarian: Асеневци, romanized: Asenevtsi, scientific transliteration: Asenevci), founded and ruled a medieval Bulgarian state, called in modern historiography the Second Bulgarian Empire, between 1185 and 1280.

The Asen dynasty rose as the leaders of Bulgaria after a rebellion against the Byzantine Empire at the turn of the year 1185/1186 caused by the increase in Imperial taxes. Some members of the Asen family entered Byzantine service in the thirteenth to fourteenth centuries. While the name Asen (Асен, medieval orthography: Асѣнь, Asěn) was originally used as a personal name in Bulgaria—usually paired with a Christian baptismal name—in foreign contexts, both Byzantine and Western, it quickly assumed the role of a family name, most notably among the Byzantine family Asan or Asanēs, descended from Ivan Asen III. The name also occurs as a family name in modern Greek, and could go back to the same name. Their origin is obscure.

== Origins ==
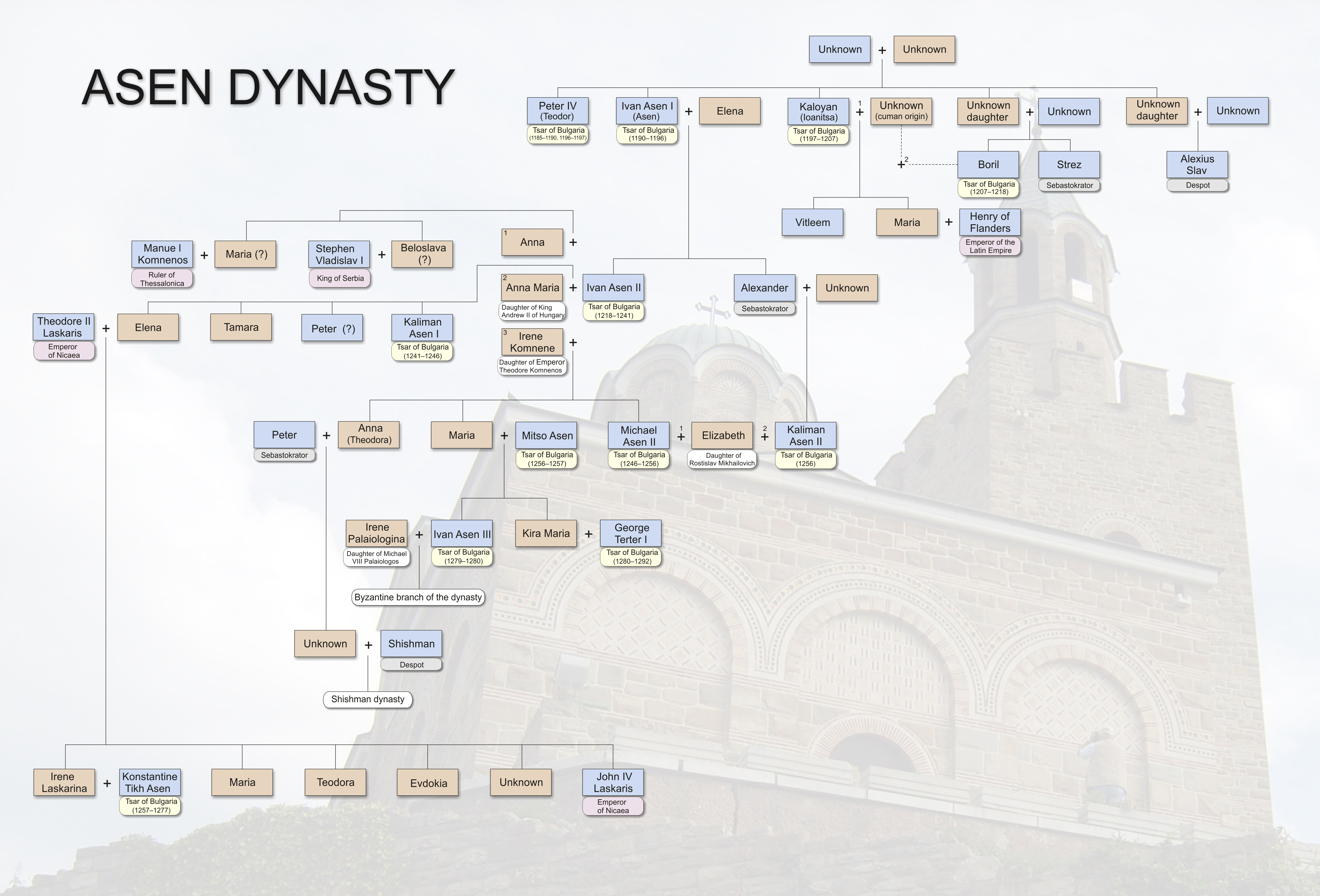
Genealogy of the Asen dynasty

The origins of the dynasty, especially the ethnic background of the three Asen brothers—Peter IV (or II) (Romanian: Petru IV), originally named Theodore (Teodor), Ivan Asen I (Romanian: Ioan Asan I) and Kaloyan (Romanian: Caloian)—are still a source of much controversy, debated among historians. There are three main hypotheses regarding their origins:

- Vlach origin, a view supported by most contemporary sources and scholars who base their claims on Western Crusade chronicles, and letters between Pope Innocent III and Kaloyan.
- Cuman origin, as some of the names in the dynasty, including Asen and Belgun, are derived from the Cuman language, as well as the family's close ties to the Cumans, such as intermarriage (including Kaloyan's wife), immediate entourage and allies. Groups of Cumans settled and mingled with the local population in many regions of the Balkans between the 10th and 13th centuries and also founded subsequent Bulgarian dynasties (Terterids and Shishmanids). Similarly, according to some researchers, the Asen dynasty might be descendants of the Ashina tribe.
- Bulgarian origin, a view that is common among the Bulgarian historians who reckon that all native sources (from the 13th century) use predominantly the terms Bulgaria, Bulgarians and Bulgarian, the Slavic names like Ivanko (relative and murderer of Ivan Asen I), Boril and Slav, that tsar Kaloyan claimed provenance from the old Bulgarian rulers and his state from the First Bulgarian Empire and declares himself a Bulgarian avenger, adopting the moniker the Romanslayer by analogy with the emperor Basil II the Bulgar Slayer and shows cruelty to the Byzantines as revenge for the murdered and blinded Bulgarians.

In their own administrative documents and correspondence, the three rulers viewed themselves as descendants and successors of the Bulgarian Tsars Samuil, Peter I and Simeon I, and the state they founded as a continuation of the First Bulgarian Empire.

In a correspondence, of 1199, the Pope talks about the "Roman descent" of Kaloyan. However, considering the actual text says Nos autem audito quod de nobili urbis Romae prosapia progenitores tui originem traxerint ("We heard that your forefathers come from a noble family from the city of Rome"), it is usually dismissed as simply a hidden compliment of the Pope to Kaloyan.

In his first letter to the Pope, Kaloyan states that neither he nor anyone at his court spoke or understood Latin, and that their correspondence had to be translated from Bulgarian into Greek and then into Latin.This has led Associate Professor Nikola Dyulgerov, a Bulgarian historian, to argue that the native language of the Asen brothers was Bulgarian.

Pope Innocent III in his letters to the Bulgarian king Kaloyan (Calojoannes) in 1204 addressed him "King of Bulgarians and Vlachs" (rex Bulgarorum et Blachorum); in answering the Pope, Kaloyan called himself imperator omnium Bulgarorum et Blachorum ("Emperor of all Bulgarians and Vlachs'), but signed himself imperator Bulgariae Calojoannes ("Emperor Kaloyan of Bulgaria"); besides, the archbishop of Veliko Tarnovo called himself totius Bulgariae et Blaciae Primas ("Primate of all Bulgaria and Vlachia").

Ivan Asen II styled himself “Tsar and sovereign of the Bulgarians“ and “Tsar of Bulgarians and Greeks” after his victory at the Battle of Klokotnitsa.

Bulgarian historiography largely negates, while Romanian historiography highlights the role of the Vlachs in the uprising. However, the scientific debate reflects the nationalistic rivalry from the 19-20th century, which did not exist in the 12-13th century. Vlachs and Bulgarian Slavs jointly inhabited Bulgaria, and both groups in sufferance were united against the common cause under a leader, regardless of the leader's "race". Niketas Choniates overemphasized the Vlachs while scarcely mentioning the Bulgarians during his narratives of the revolt, but regardless of their ethnicity, it was a joint venture of the Bulgarians, Vlachs and Cumans.

=== Etymology ===
The name of the dynasty comes from one of the brothers, namely Asen I. The etymology is most likely of Cuman Turkic origin, derived from "esen" which meant "safe, sound, healthy" and the Belgun nickname seems to be derived from Turkic "bilgün", which meant "wise". Further support to this connection can be found in the charters of the Great Lavra of Mt. Athos from the end of the 12th century, which mention the monastery's problems with some of the Cuman stratiotes, where "Asen" is listed as the name of one of those Cumans.

Another study shows that the only name that makes sense is änish ("descent") and the word can be found almost exclusively in the languages of the Kipchak Turks.

== Bulgarian Emperors from the Asen dynasty ==
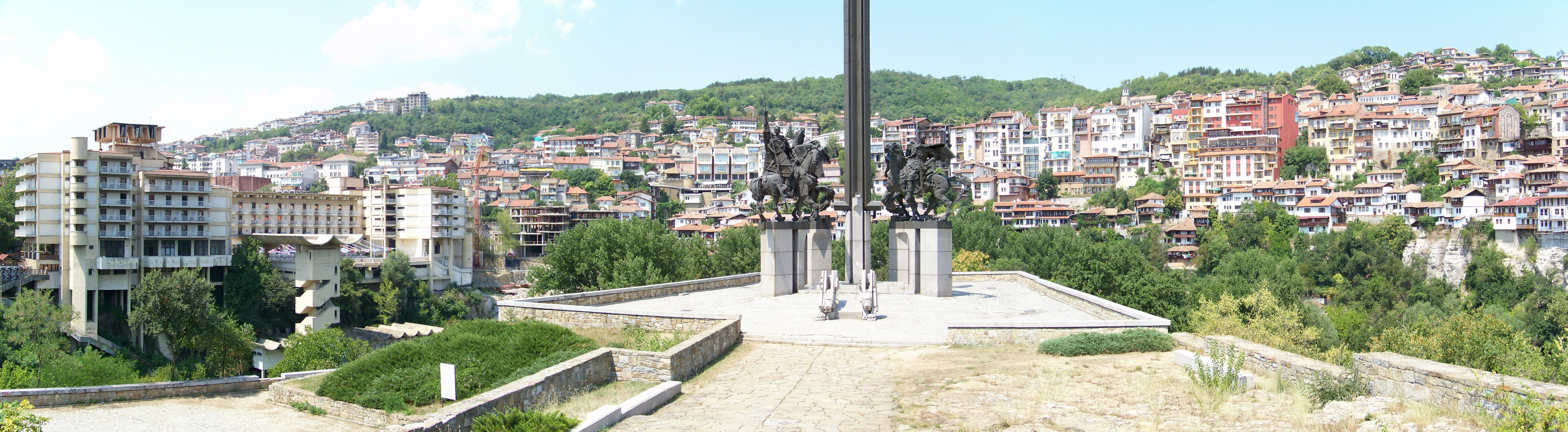
Monument to the Asen Dynasty, Veliko Tarnovo

Peter IV (Theodore)	1185 – 1190
Ivan Asen I (John Asen I, Asen)	1190 – 1196
Peter IV (Theodore)	1196 – 1197
Kaloyan (John, Ioan, Ioanitsa)	1197 – 1207
Boril	1207 – 1218
Ivan Asen II (John Asen II)	1218 – 1241
Kaliman Asen I (Koloman)	1241 – 1246
Michael II Asen (Michael Asen I)	1246 – 1256
Kaliman Asen II (Koloman)	1256
Mitso Asen (Mitso)	1256 – 1257
Constantine Tikh (Constantine Asen I)	1257 – 1277
Michael Tikh (Michael Asen II)	1272 – 1279
Ivan Asen III (John Asen III)	1279 – 1280

There is significant variety and inconsistency in the rendition and numbering of monarchs' names in historiography; the formal names of the monarchs of the Second Bulgarian Empire are discussed in detail by Mladjov 2015.

== Byzantine branch ==
The Asens in Byzantium largely descend from Ivan Asen III, who ruled briefly as Emperor of Bulgaria before fleeing to Constantinople as Ivaylo's uprising was gaining momentum in 1280. A despotes under Michael VIII Palaiologos, Ivan Asen III had already been married to the Byzantine Emperor's eldest daughter, Irene Palaiologina. The couple's five sons and two daughters were the progenitors of one of the highest-regarded Byzantine noble families of their time, along with the Palaiologoi. Among the Byzantine Asens, three bore the title of despotes, three that of sebastokrator, two panhypersebastos, one was a megas doux and two were titled megas primikerios. In Greek, the male form of the family name is rendered as Ἀσάνης (Asanis) and the female as Ασανίνα (Asanina).

A smaller branch descends from Elena Asenina of Bulgaria, wife of Nicaean Emperor Theodore II Laskaris.

The Asens of Byzantium intermarried with other prominent noble dynasties, including the Kantakouzenos, Doukas, Laskaris, Tornikios, Raoul and Zaccaria families. Notable members of the Asen family in the Byzantine Empire include:

- Andronikos Asen, epitropos of the Morea (1316–1322)
- Irene Asanina, Empress Consort of John VI Kantakouzenos (1347–1354)
- Matthew Asen Kantakouzenos, Co-Emperor of Byzantium (1353–1357)
- Matthew Palaiologos Asen, Lord of Corinth (1454–1458)

=== Byzantine Asens elsewhere ===
From Byzantium, the Asens spread as far as Frankish Greece, the Principality of Theodoro, the Principality of Moldavia, the Kingdom of Naples and the Kingdom of Aragon.

- Eudoxia Laskarina Asanina (1248–1311), Nicaean princess, Countess of Ventimiglia and Tende and nun in Aragon
- Helena Asanina Kantakouzene, Dowager Countess of Salona (1380–1394)
- Andronikos Asen Zaccaria, Prince of Achaea (before 1386-1401)
- Thomas Asen Palaiologos, exile in Naples and ktetor
- Maria Asanina Palaiologina, Princess Consort of Moldavia (1472–1477)

== See also ==
- Ashina tribe
- History of Bulgaria
- List of Bulgarian monarchs
