= Peter (sevastokrator) =

Peter was a Bulgarian nobleman who held the high title of sevastokrator around 1253 and ruled significant territories in Bulgaria during the reign of his brother-in-law, Michael II Asen. He married Anna-Teodora a daughter of Ivan Asen II of Bulgaria with whom he had a daughter, who married despotes Shishman of Vidin and founded the Shishman branch of the Asen dynasty.

== Sources ==
- Fine, John V. A. (1994). The Late Medieval Balkans: A Critical Survey from the Late Twelfth Century to the Ottoman Conquest. The University of Michigan Press. ISBN 0-472-08260-4.
- Madgearu, Alexandru (2017). The Asanids: The Political and Military History of the Second Bulgarian Empire, 1185–1280. BRILL. ISBN 978-9-004-32501-2.
- Mladjov, Ian S. R. (2012). "The Children of Ivan Asen II and Eirene Komnene". Bulgaria Mediaevalis. 3 (1): 485–500. ISSN 1314-2941.
