= Michael II Asen =

Emperor of Bulgaria from 1246 to 1256/1257

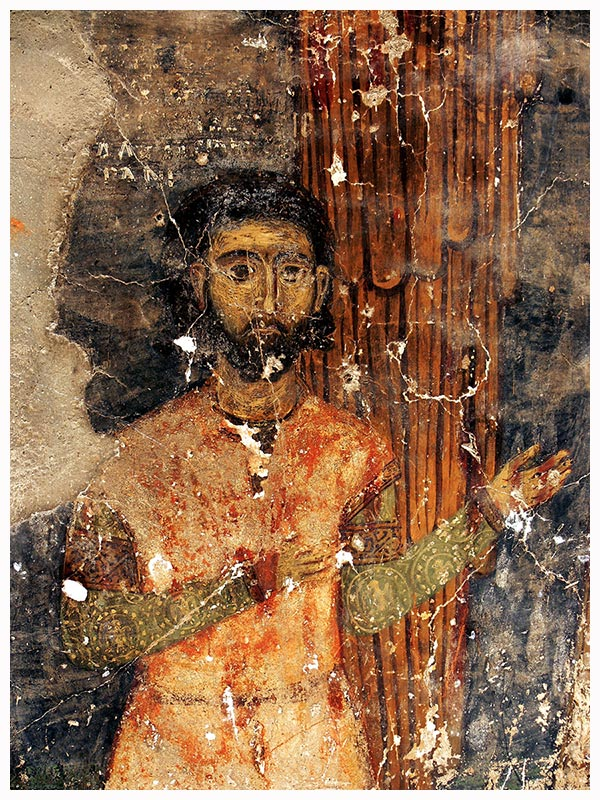
- Portrait, 14th century

Emperor of Bulgaria
- Reign: 1246–1256/1257
- Predecessor: Kaliman Asen I
- Successor: Kaliman Asen II
- Born: c. 1239
- Died: December 1256/January 1257
- Spouse: Anna of Macsó
- House: Asen dynasty
- Father: Ivan Asen II of Bulgaria
- Mother: Irene Komnene Doukaina

Michael II Asen (Bulgarian: Михаил II Асен; c. 1239 – December 1256/January 1257) was emperor (tsar) of Bulgaria from 1246 to 1256 or 1257. He was the son of Ivan Asen II and Irene Komnene Doukaina. He succeeded his half-brother, Kaliman I Asen. His mother or other relative must have ruled Bulgaria during his minority.

John III Doukas Vatatzes, Emperor of Nicaea, and Michael II of Epirus invaded Bulgaria shortly after Michael's ascension. Vatatzes captured the Bulgarian fortresses along the river Vardar; Michael of Epirus took possession of western Macedonia. In alliance with the Republic of Ragusa, Michael II Asen broke into Serbia in 1254, but he could not occupy Serbian territories. After Vatatzes died, he reconquered most territories lost to Nicea, but Vatatzes's son and successor, Theodore II Laskaris, launched a successful counter-offensive, forcing Michael to sign a peace treaty. Shortly after the treaty, discontented boyars (noblemen) murdered Michael.

== Early life ==
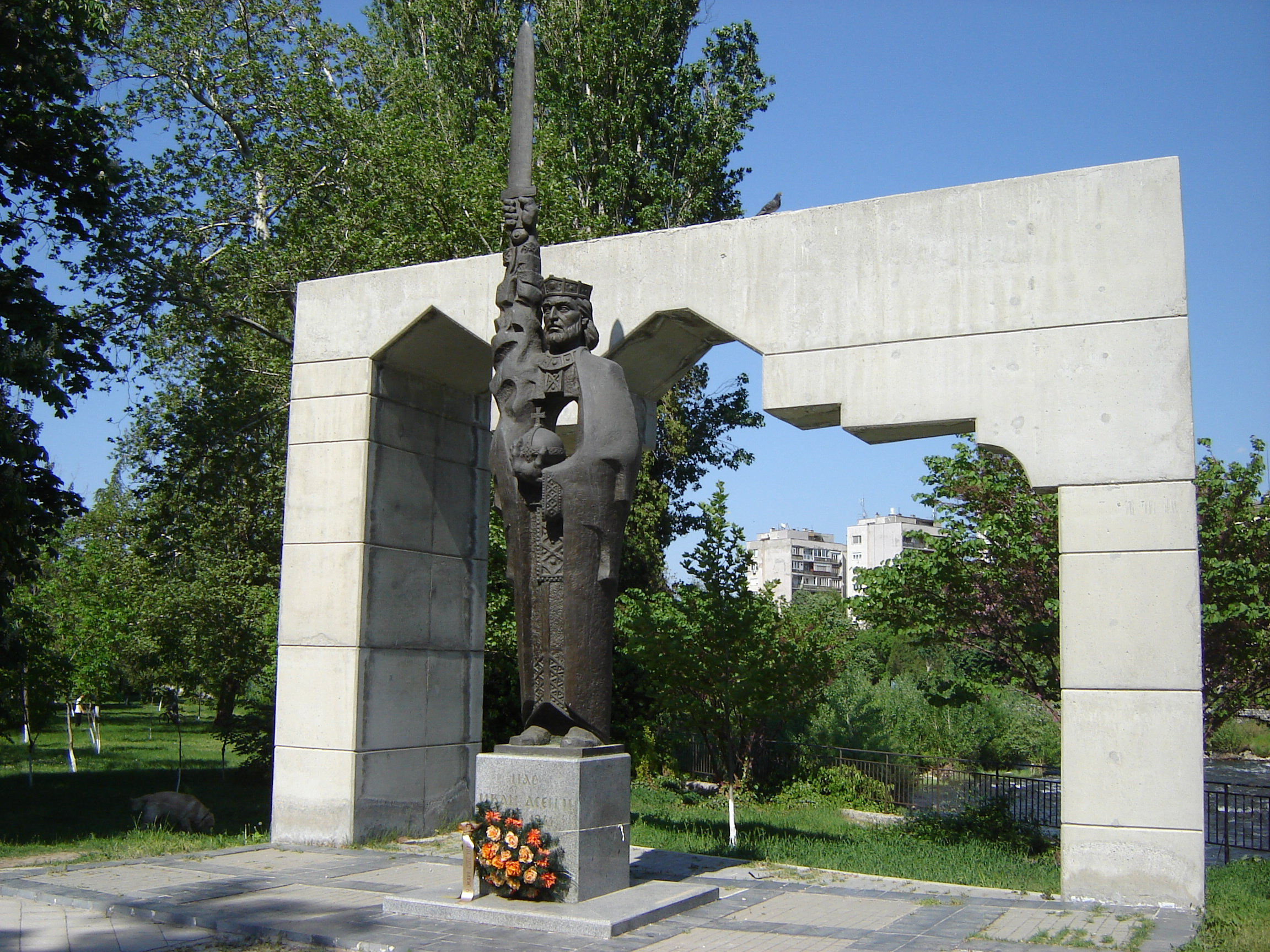
A monument to Michael's father, Ivan Asen II of Bulgaria

Michael was the son of Ivan Asen II of Bulgaria and Irene Komnene Doukaina. He was most probably born in 1239. His father, who died in the first half of 1241, was succeeded by Michael's seven-year-old half-brother, Kaliman. Kaliman died unexpectedly (possibly of poisoning, according to contemporaneous rumors) in August or September 1246.

== Reign ==
=== Territorial losses ===
Michael, who was only seven or eight, succeeded his half-brother. According to a scholarly theory, Michael's mother ruled Bulgaria during his minority, but she stayed in Thessaloniki just three months after his coronation. According to another theory, his brother-in-law, Sevastokrator Peter, assumed the regency for the minor tsar.

John III Doukas Vatatzes, Emperor of Nicaea, invaded Bulgaria soon after Kaliman's death. He captured Serres and seized Melnik with the support of the local inhabitants. He soon invaded the valley of the river Vardar, and occupied all fortresses in the region. Michael II Komnenos Doukas, ruler of Epirus, also broke into Bulgaria and occupied western Macedonia. The Bulgarians acknowledged Vatatzes's conquest in a peace treaty in late 1246 or in early 1247. The treaty also prescribed them to support Vatatzes against the Latin Empire of Constantinople.

=== New wars ===
Béla IV of Hungary granted the Banate of Severin to the Knights Hospitaller on 2 June 1247. The charter of grant listed Bulgaria among the countries against which the Hospitallers were to provide military assistance, evidencing Béla's plan to attack Bulgaria. Despite the tense relationship between Hungary and Bulgaria, Bulgarian troops assisted Vatatzes to invade the Thracian territories of the Latin Empire in August 1247.

William of Rubruck, who visited the Mongol Empire between 1253 and 1255, listed Michael's realms ("Blakia—Assan's territory—and Little Bulgaria") among the countries paying tribute to the Mongols. Michael concluded an alliance with the Republic of Ragusa (now Dubrovnik in Croatia) against Stefan Uroš I, King of Serbia, in 1254. The treaty shows that Sevastokrator Peter ruled a large territory in Bulgaria almost independently of Michael. After Radoslav of Hum joined the coalition, Michael launched a campaign against Serbia, reaching as far as Bijelo Polje. According to a scholarly theory, a Hungarian attack against Bulgaria forced Michael to hastily return from Serbia.

Vatatzes died on 4 November 1254. Taking advantage of the absence of significant Nicene forces, Michael broke into Macedonia and reconquered the lands lost to Vatatzes in 1246 or 1247. The Byzantine historian, George Akropolites, recorded that the Bulgarian-speaking local inhabitants supported Michael's invasion because they wanted to shake off the "yoke of those who spoke another language". To secure a peaceful relationship with Hungary, Michael married Anna of Macsó, who was the daughter of Béla IV's daughter, Anna, and her husband, Rostislav Mikhailovich. A man and a woman depicted on an icon in the St Michael Church in Kastoria was wrongly associated with Michael and his wife (or mother).

=== Last years ===
Vatatzes's son and successor, Theodore II Laskaris, launched a counter-invasion in early 1255. When referring to the new war between Nicea and Bulgaria, Rubruck described Michael as "a mere lad whose power has been eroded" by the Mongols. Michael could not resist the invasion and the Nicene troops captured Stara Zagora. It was only the harsh weather that prevented Theodore's army from continuing the invasion. The Nicene troops resumed their attack in the spring and occupied most fortresses in the Rhodope Mountains. A rebellion at Melnik forced Theodore to march towards the town, but he managed to defeat the rioters before returning to Asia Minor for the winter.

Michael broke into the European territory of the Empire of Nicea in the spring of 1256. He pillaged Thrace near Constantinople, but the Nicene army defeated his Cuman troops. He asked his father-in-law to mediate a reconciliation between Bulgaria and Nicea in June. Theodore agreed to sign a peace treaty only after Michael acknowledged the loss of the lands that he had claimed for Bulgaria. The treaty determined the upper course of the river Maritsa as the border between the two countries. The peace treaty outraged many boyars (noblemen) who decided to replace Michael with his cousin, Kaliman Asen. Kaliman and his allies attacked the Tsar who died from his wounds in late 1256 or early 1257.

Now the ruler of the Bulgarians, Michael, ... a man who nurtured a great hatred against [Theodore II Laskaris] and against the Romans, was mortally wounded by his first cousin Kaliman, with the knowledge of certain inhabitants of [Tarnovo], when [Michael] was staying somewhere outside this town; he died immediately.

— George Akropolites: The History

== Ancestors ==
Ancestors of Michael II Asen of Bulgaria

4. Ivan Asen I of Bulgaria
2. Ivan Asen II of Bulgaria
5. Elena-Evgenia
1. Michael II Asen of Bulgaria
24. Constantine Angelos
12. John Angelos Doukas
25. Theodora Komnene
6. Theodore Komnenos Doukas
13. Zoe Doukaina (?)
3. Irene Komnene Doukaina
7. Maria Petraliphaina

== Notes ==
1. He is known in Bulgarian historiography as Michael II Asen (Михаил II Асен).

== Sources ==
=== Primary sources ===
- George Akropolites: The History (Translated with and Introduction and Commentary by Ruth Macrides) (2007). Oxford University Press. ISBN 978-0-19-921067-1.
- The Mission of Friar William of Rubruck: His journey to the court of the Great Khan Möngke, 1253–1255 (Translated by Peter Jackson, Introduction, notes, and appendices by Peter Jackson and David Morgan) (2009). The Hakluyt Society. ISBN 978-0-87220-981-7.

=== Secondary sources ===
- Fine, John V. A. (1994). The Late Medieval Balkans: A Critical Survey from the Late Twelfth Century to the Ottoman Conquest. The University of Michigan Press. ISBN 0-472-08260-4.
- Madgearu, Alexandru (2016). The Asanids: The Political and Military History of the Second Bulgarian Empire, 1185–1280. BRILL. ISBN 978-9-004-32501-2.
- Nicol, Donald M. (1984). The Despotate of Epiros, 1267–1479: A Contribution to the History of Greece in the Middle Ages. Cambridge University Press. ISBN 978-0-521-13089-9.
- Treadgold, Warren (1997). A History of the Byzantine State and Society. Stanford University Press. ISBN 0-8047-2630-2.
- Vásáry, István (2005). Cumans and Tatars: Oriental Military in the Pre-Ottoman Balkans, 1185–1365. Cambridge University Press. ISBN 0-521-83756-1.

Michael II Asen Asen dynasty Born: c. 1239 Died: 1256/1257
Regnal titles
Preceded by Kaliman Asen I	Emperor of Bulgaria; 1246–1256/57	Succeeded by Kaliman Asen II
