= Elena-Evgenia, wife of Ivan Asen I =

Second wife of tsar Ivan Asen I of Bulgaria

Elena Елена
- Spouse: Ivan Asen I
- Issue: Ivan Asen II; Alexander, sebastocrator

Elena (Bulgarian: Елена) was the second wife of tsar Ivan Asen I of Bulgaria. She was the mother of tsar Ivan Asen II of Bulgaria.

== Biography ==
Her antecedents are unknown. She is sometimes alleged to be a daughter of Stefan Nemanja of Serbia, but this relationship is questionable and would have caused various canonical impediments to marriages between their descendants. Elena married Ivan Asen I in 1183 at the age of thirteen.

In 1188, Elena was captured by enemy Byzantine forces during their attempted Siege of Lovech and kept in Constantinople as a hostage by Emperor Isaac II Angelos. When Ivan Asen ascended the throne as co-tsar, he sent his younger brother Kaloyan to Constantinople as hostage in exchange for Elena.

By her marriage to Ivan Asen I, Elena had at least two sons:

1. Ivan Asen II, emperor of Bulgaria 1218–1241
2. Alexander (Aleksandăr), sebastokrator, who died after 1232; Alexander had a son named Kaliman Asen II, emperor of Bulgaria in 1256

After the assassination of Ivan Asen I in 1196, Elena retired to a convent under the monastic name Evgenia (Bulgarian: Евгения). Her memory is honored in the Synodic of Bulgarian Church:

For Elena, the new and pious tsarina, mother of the great tsar Ivan Asen, adopted then an angelic image and called Evgenia, may her memory live forever.

After her son ascended the throne, Elena was honored as empress dowager.

== Sources ==
- "Кой кой е в средновековна България", изд. къща "Петър Берон", 1999 г., ISBN 9544020470
- "Фамилията на Асеневци", Божилов, Ив.
