= Ivan Asen II =

Emperor of Bulgaria from 1218 to 1241

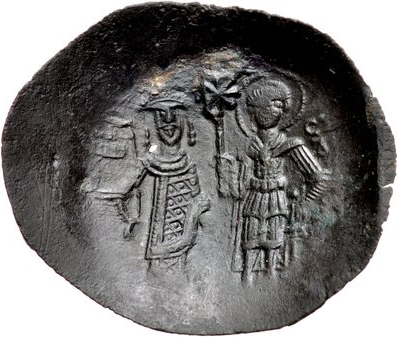
- A coin of Ivan Asen II

Emperor of Bulgaria
- Reign: 1218 – 1241
- Predecessor: Boril
- Successor: Kaliman Asen I
- Born: 1190s
- Died: May/June 1241
- Spouse: Anna (Anisia); Anna Maria of Hungary; Eirene (Xene)
- Issue: Maria; Beloslava; Elena; Tamara; Kaliman Asen I Michael Asen; Anna-Teodora; Maria
- House: Asen
- Father: Ivan Asen I
- Mother: Elena

Ivan Asen II, also known as John Asen II (Bulgarian: Иван Асен II, [iˈvan ɐˈsɛn ˈftɔri]; 1190s – May/June 1241), was Emperor (Tsar) of Bulgaria from 1218 to 1241. He was still a child when his father Ivan Asen I – one of the founders of the Second Bulgarian Empire – was killed in 1196. His supporters tried to secure the throne for him after his uncle, Kaloyan, was murdered in 1207, but Kaloyan's other nephew, Boril, overcame them. Ivan Asen fled from Bulgaria and settled in the Rus' principalities.

Boril could never strengthen his rule which enabled Ivan Asen to muster an army and return to Bulgaria. He captured Tarnovo and blinded Boril in 1218. Initially, he supported the full communion of the Bulgarian Church with the Papacy and concluded alliances with the neighboring Catholic powers, Hungary and the Latin Empire of Constantinople. He tried to achieve the regency for the 11-year-old Latin Emperor, Baldwin II, after 1228, but the Latin aristocrats did not support Ivan Asen. He inflicted a crushing defeat on Theodore Komnenos Doukas of the Empire of Thessalonica, in the Battle of Klokotnitsa in 1230. Theodore's empire soon collapsed and Ivan Asen conquered large territories in Macedonia, Thessaly and Thrace.

The control of the trade on the Via Egnatia enabled Ivan Asen to implement an ambitious building program in Tarnovo and struck gold coins in his new mint in Ohrid. He started negotiations about the return of the Bulgarian Church to Orthodoxy after the barons of the Latin Empire had elected John of Brienne regent for Baldwin II in 1229. Ivan Asen and the Emperor of Nicaea, John III Vatatzes, concluded an alliance against the Latin Empire at their meeting in 1235. During the same conference, the rank of patriarch was granted to the head of the Bulgarian Church in token of its autocephaly (independence). Ivan Asen and Vatatzes joined their forces in attacking Constantinople, but the former realized that Vatatzes could primarily take advantage of the fall of the Latin Empire and broke off his alliance with Nicaea in 1237. After the Mongols invaded the Pontic steppes, several Cuman groups fled to Bulgaria.

== Early life ==
Ivan Asen's father, Ivan Asen I, was one of the two leaders of the 1185 uprising against the Byzantine Empire in 1185. The nomadic Cumans, who dwelled in the Pontic steppes, supported the rebels, aiding them in the foundation of the Second Bulgarian Empire. The nation initially encompassed the Balkan Mountains and the plains to the north of the mountains as far as the Lower Danube. Ivan Asen I was styled "basileus" (or emperor) of the Bulgarians from around 1187. His son and namesake was born between 1192 and 1196. The child's mother was called Elena, "the new and pious tsarina" (or empress), in the Synodikon of Tzar Boril.

A boyar (or noble), Ivanko, killed Ivan Asen I in 1196. The murdered emperor was succeeded by his younger brother, Kaloyan. He entered into correspondence with Pope Innocent III and offered to acknowledge the popes' primacy in order to secure the support of the Holy See. The Pope denied the request to elevate the head of the Bulgarian Church to the rank of patriarch, but he granted the inferior title of primate to the Bulgarian prelate. The Pope did not acknowledge Kaloyan's claim to the title of emperor, but a papal legate crowned Kaloyan king in Tarnovo on 8 November 1204. Kaloyan took advantage of the disintegration of the Byzantine Empire after the Fourth Crusade and expanded his authority over significant territories. He was murdered while besieging Thessaloniki in October 1207.

The teenager Ivan Asen had a strong claim to succeed his uncle, but Kaloyan's Cuman widow married Boril—the son of one of Kaloyan's sisters—who was proclaimed emperor. The exact circumstances of Boril's ascension to the throne are unknown. The 13th-century historian, George Akropolites, recorded that Ivan Asen soon fled from Bulgaria and settled in the "lands of the Russians" (in the Principality of Galicia or Kiev). According to a later source, Ephrem the Monk, Ivan Asen and his brother, Alexander, were taken to the Cumans by their tutor before they moved to the Rus' principalities. Florin Curta and John V. A. Fine write that a group of boyars had tried to secure the throne to Ivan Asen after Kaloyan's death, but they were overcome by Boril's supporters, and Ivan Asen had to leave Bulgaria. Historian Alexandru Madgearu proposes that primarily boyars who opposed the Cumans' growing influence had supported Ivan Asen.

Boril's rule was always insecure. His own relatives, Strez and Alexius Slav, denied to obey to him and he had to face frequent uprisings. Ivan Asen stayed in Rus' "a considerable time", according to Akropolites, before he gathered about him "a certain of the Russian rabble" and returned to Bulgaria. Madgearu says, Ivan Asen could hire soldiers most probably because Boril's opponents had sent money to him. Historian István Vásáry associates Ivan Asen's "Russian rabble" with the semi-nomadic Brodnici. He defeated Boril and seized "not a little land" (that Madgearu tentatively associates with Dobruja).

Curta and Fine write that Ivan Asen returned to Bulgaria after Boril's ally, Andrew II of Hungary, had departed for the Fifth Crusade in 1217. Boril withdrew to Tarnovo after his defeat, but Ivan Asen laid siege to the town. Akropolites claimed that the siege lasted for seven years. Most modern historians agree that Akropolites confused months for years, but Genoveva Cankova-Petkova accepts Akropolites' chronology. She says that the three Cuman chieftains whom Andrew II's military commander, Joachim, Count of Hermannstadt, defeated near Vidin around 1210 had been hired by Ivan Asen, because he wanted to prevent Joachim from supporting Boril against the rebels who had seized the town. Vásáry states that her theory is "far-fetched", lacking any solid evidence. The townspeople of Tarnovo surrendered to Ivan Asen after the long siege. He captured and blinded Boril, and "gained control of all the territory of the Bulgarians", according to Acropolites.

== Reign ==
=== Consolidation ===
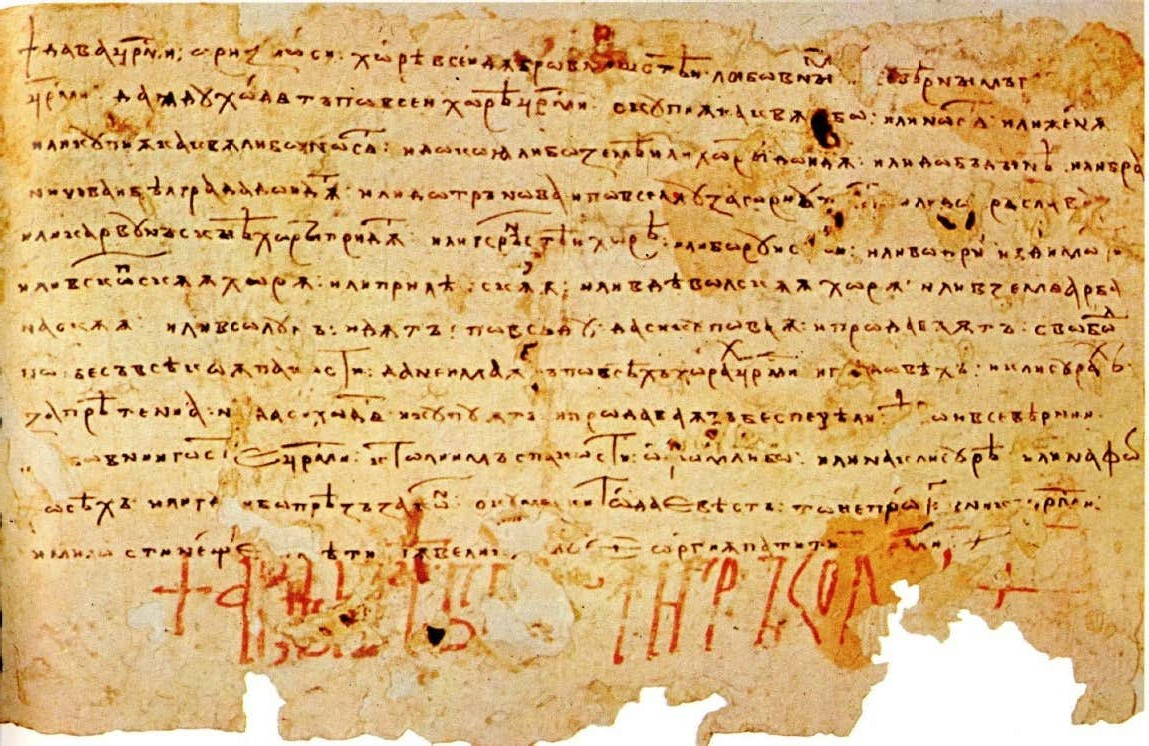
horismos of Ivan Asen II for the city of Ragusa (Dubrovnik)

The first decade of Ivan Asen's rule is poorly documented. Andrew II of Hungary reached Bulgaria during his return from the Fifth Crusade in late 1218. Ivan Asen did not allow the king to cross the country until Andrew promised to give his daughter, Maria, in marriage to him. Maria's dowry included the region of Belgrade and Braničevo, the possession of which had been disputed by the Hungarian and Bulgarian rulers for decades.

When Robert of Courtenay, the newly elected Latin Emperor, was marching from France towards Constantinople in 1221, Ivan Asen accompanied him across Bulgaria. He also supplied the emperor's retinue with food and fodder. The relationship between Bulgaria and the Latin Empire remained peaceful during the reign of Robert. Ivan Asen also made peace with the ruler of Epirus, Theodore Komnenos Doukas, who was one of the principal enemies of the Latin Empire. Theodore's brother, Manuel Doukas, married Ivan Asen's illegitimate daughter, Mary, in 1225. Theodore who regarded himself the lawful successor of the Byzantine emperors was crowned emperor around 1226.

The Latin Emperor Robert was succeeded by his 11-year-old brother, Baldwin II, in January 1228. Ivan Asen proposed to marry off his daughter, Helen, to the young emperor, because he wanted to lay claim to the regency. He also promised to unite his troops with the Latins to reconquer the territories that they had lost to Theodore Komnenos Doukas. Although the Latin lords did not want to accept his offer, they started negotiations about it, because they tried to avoid a military conflict with him. Simultaneously, they offered the regency to the former king of Jerusalem, John of Brienne, who agreed to leave Italy for Constantinople, but they kept their agreement in secret for years. Only Venetian authors who compiled their chronicles decades after the events–Marino Sanudo, Andrea Dandolo and Lorenzo de Monacis–recorded Ivan Asen's offer to the Latins, but the reliability of their report is widely accepted by modern historians.

Relationship between Bulgaria and Hungary deteriorated in the late 1220s. Shortly after the Mongols inflicted a serious defeat on the united armies of the Rus' princes and Cuman chieftains in the Battle of the Kalka River in 1223, a leader of a western Cuman tribe, Boricius, converted to Catholicism in the presence of Andrew II's heir and co-ruler, Béla IV. Pope Gregory IX stated in a letter that those who had attacked the converted Cumans were also the enemies of the Roman Catholic Church, possibly in reference to a previous attack by Ivan Asen, according to Madgearu. Hungarian troops may have tried to capture Vidin already in 1228, but the dating of the siege is uncertain, and it may have occurred only in 1232.

=== Expansion ===
Theodore Komnenos Doukas unexpectedly invaded Bulgaria along the river Maritsa in early 1230. The Epirote and Bulgarian armies clashed at Klokotnitsa in March or April. Ivan Asen personally commanded the reserve troops, including 1,000 Cuman mounted archers. He held a copy of his peace treaty with Theodore high in the air while marching into battle as a reference to his opponents' betrayal. Their sudden attack against the Epirotes secured his victory. The Bulgarians captured Theodore and his principal officials and seized much booty, but Ivan Asen released the common soldiers. After Theodore tried to hatch a plot against Ivan Asen, he had the captured emperor blinded. A Spanish rabbi, Jacob Arophe, was informed that Ivan Asen first ordered two Jews to blind Theodore because he knew that the emperor had persecuted the Jews in his empire, but they refused, for which they were thrown from a cliff.

The Second Bulgarian Empire during Ivan Asen II

Bulgaria became the dominant power of Southeastern Europe after the Battle of Klokotnitsa. His troops swept into Theodore's lands and conquered dozens of Epirote towns. They captured Ohrid, Prilep and Serres in Macedonia, Adrianople, Demotika and Plovdiv in Thrace and also occupied Great Vlachia in Thessaly. Alexius Slav's realm in the Rhodope Mountains was also annexed. Ivan Asen placed Bulgarian garrisons in the important fortresses and appointed his own men to command them and to collect the taxes, but local officials continued to administer other places in the conquered territories. He replaced the Greek bishops with Bulgarian prelates in Macedonia. He made generous grants to the monasteries on Mount Athos during his visit there in 1230, but he could not persuade the monks to acknowledge the jurisdiction of the primate of the Bulgarian Church. His son-in-law, Manuel Doukas, took control of the Empire of Thessaloniki. The Bulgarian troops also made a plundering raid against Serbia, because Stefan Radoslav, King of Serbia, had supported his father-in-law, Theodore, against Bulgaria.

Ivan Asen's conquests secured the Bulgarian control of the Via Egnatia (the important trade route between Thessaloniki and Durazzo). He established a mint in Ohrid which began to strike gold coins. His growing revenues enabled him to accomplish an ambitious building program in Tarnovo. The Church of the Holy Forty Martyrs, with its facade decorated with ceramic tiles and murals, commemorated his victory at Klokotnitsa. The imperial palace on the Tsaravets Hill was enlarged. A memorial inscription on one of the columns of the Church of the Holy Forty Martyrs recorded Ivan Asen's conquests. It referred to him as the "tsar of the Bulgarians, Greeks and other countries", implying that he was planning to revive the Byzantine Empire under his rule. He also styled himself emperor in his letter of grant to the Vatopedi Monastery on Mount Athos and in his diploma about the privileges of the Ragusan merchants. Imitating the Byzantine emperors, he sealed his charters with gold bulls. One of his seals portrayed him wearing imperial insignia, also revealing his imperial ambitions.

=== Conflicts with Catholic powers ===
News about John of Brienne's election to the regency in the Latin Empire outraged Ivan Asen. He sent envoys to the Ecumenical Patriarch Germanus II to Nicaea to start negotiations about the position of the Bulgarian Church. Pope Gregory IX urged Andrew II of Hungary to launch a crusade against the enemies of the Latin Empire on 9 May 1231, most probably in reference to Ivan Asen's hostile actions, according to Madgearu. Béla IV of Hungary invaded Bulgaria and captured Belgrade and Braničevo in late 1231 or in 1232, but the Bulgarians reconquered the lost territories already in the early 1230s. The Hungarians seized the Bulgarian fortress at Severin (now Drobeta-Turnu Severin in Romania) to the north of the Lower Danube and established a border province, known as the Banate of Szörény, to prevent the Bulgarians from expanding to the north.

The Serbian nobles who promoted an alliance with Bulgaria revolted against Stefan Radoslav and forced him into exile in 1233. His brother and successor, Stefan Vladislav I, married Ivan Asen's daughter, Beloslava. Ivan Asen dismissed the Uniate primate of the Bulgarian Church, Basil I and continued the negotiations about the return of the Bulgarian Church to Orthodoxy. The Orthodox archbishop of Ankyra, Christophoros, who visited Bulgaria in early 1233, urged Ivan Asen to send a bishop to Nicaea to be ordained by the Ecumenical Patriarch. An agreement about the marriage of Theodore II Laskaris–the heir to the Emperor of Nicaea, John III Vatatzes–and Ivan Asen's daughter, Helen, was concluded in 1234.

Sava, the highly respected archbishop of the Serbian Orthodox Church, died in Tarnovo on 14 January 1235. According to Madgearu, Sava had most probably been deeply involved in the negotiations between the Bulgarian Church and the Ecumenical Patriarch. Ivan Asen met with Vatatzes in Lampsacus in early 1235 to reach a compromise and conclude a formal alliance. Patriarch Germanus II and the new head of the Bulgarian Church, Joachim I, were also present at the meeting. After Joachim abandoned his claim to jurisdiction over Mount Athos and the archbishops of Thessaloniki, Germanus recognized him as patriarch, thus acknowledging the autocephaly of the Bulgarian Church. The marriage of Helen and Theodor Lascaris was also celebrated in Lampsacus.

Ivan Asen and Vatatzes made an alliance against the Latin Empire. The Bulgarian troops conquered the territories to the west of the Maritsa, while the Nicean army seized the lands to the east of the river. They laid siege to Constantinople, but John of Brienne and the Venetian fleet forced them to lift the siege before the end of 1235. Early next year, they again attacked Constantinople, but the second siege ended in a new failure.

=== Last years ===
Ivan Asen realized that Vatatzes could primarily take advantage of the fall of the Latin Empire. He persuaded Vatatzes to return his daughter, Helen, to him, stating that he and his wife "wished to see" her and "give her a paternal embrace". He severed his alliance with Nicea and entered into a new correspondence with Pope Gregory IX, offering to acknowledge his primacy in early 1237. The Pope urged him to make peace with the Latin Empire.

A new Mongol invasion of Europe forced thousands of Cumans to flee from the steppes in the summer of 1237. Ivan Asen who could not prevent them from crossing the Danube into Bulgaria allowed them to invade Macedonia and Thrace. The Cumans captured and pillaged the smallest fortresses and plundered the countryside. The Latins hired Cuman troops and allied with Ivan Asen who laid siege the Nicean fortress at Tzurullon. He was still besieging the fortress when news of the simultaneous deaths of his wife, son, and Patriarch Joachim I reached him. Taking these events as signs of the wrath of God for breaking his alliance with Vatatzes, Ivan Asen abandoned the siege and sent his daughter Helena back to her husband in Nicaea at the end of 1237.

The widowed Ivan Asen fell in love with Irene who had been captured along with her father Theodore Komnenos Doukas in 1230. According to Akropolites, Ivan Asen loved his new wife "exceedingly, no less than Antony did Cleopatra". The marriage resulted in the release of Theodore, who returned to Thessalonica, chased out his brother Manuel, and imposed his own son John as despot. Pope Gregory IX accused Ivan Asen of protecting heretics and urged Béla IV of Hungary to launch a crusade against Bulgaria in early 1238. The Pope offered Bulgaria to Béla, but the Hungarian king did not want to wage war against Ivan Asen. Ivan Asen granted a free passage to the Latin emperor, Baldwin II, and the crusaders who accompanied him during their march from France to Constantinople in 1239, although he had not abandoned his alliance with Vatatzes. New crusader troops crossed Bulgaria with Ivan Asen's consent in early 1240.

Ivan Asen sent envoys to Hungary before May 1240, most probably because he wanted to forge a defensive alliance against the Mongols. The Mongols' authority expanded as far as the Lower Danube after they captured Kiev on 6 December 1240. The Mongol expansion forced dozens of dispossessed Rus' princes and boyars to flee to Bulgaria. The Cumans who had settled in Hungary also fled to Bulgaria after their chieftain, Köten, was murdered in March 1241. According to a biography of the Mamluk sultan, Baibars, who was descended from a Cuman tribe, this tribe also sought asylum in Bulgaria after the Mongol invasion. The same source adds, that "A.n.s.khan, the king of Vlachia", who is associated with Ivan Asen by modern scholars, allowed the Cumans to settle in a valley, but he soon attacked and killed or enslaved them. Madgearu writes that Ivan Asen most probably attacked the Cumans because he wanted to prevent them from pillaging Bulgaria.

The date of Ivan Asen's death is unknown. Vásáry says, the tsar died on 24 June 1241. However, the contemporaneous Alberic of Trois-Fontaines recorded that Ivan Asen's successor, Kaliman I Asen, signed a truce on the feast of Saint John the Baptist (24 June), evidencing that Ivan Asen had already died. Madgearu writes, that Ivan Asen most probably died in May or June 1241.

== Family ==
Ivan Asen married two or three times. According to a scholarly theory, his first wife was one Anna whom he forced to enter a monastery after he engaged Maria of Hungary and Anna died as the nun Anisia. Historian Plamen Pavlov states that Anna–Anisia was actually Kaloyan's widow. Anna–Anisia may have been a concubine instead of a legitimate spouse, and she may have been the mother of his two eldest daughters:

1. Maria (?), who married Manuel of Thessalonica.
2. Beloslava (?), who married Stefan Vladislav I of Serbia.

Ivan Asen married Maria of Hungary in 1221. The Synodikon of Tsar Boril and other Bulgarian primary sources referred to her as Anna, suggesting that her name was changed either after she came to Bulgaria, or after she converted to Orthodoxy in 1235. She gave birth to four children.

- Helen, who was married to Theodore II Lascaris in 1235, was one of her daughters. Maria-Anna's first daughter,
- Tamara, was promised to the future Byzantine emperor, Michael Palaiologos in 1254. Maria-Anna's second daughter,
- Kaliman Asen, was born in 1234, thus he was still a minor when he succeeded his father. Ivan Asen and Maria-Anna's elder son,
- Peter (?) died while Ivan Asen II was besieging Tzurullon in the summer of 1237. Maria-Anna and his other son.

Marrying Irene Komnene Doukaina, Ivan Asen II would have broken church canons, as his daughter from a previous marriage was married to Eirene's uncle Manuel of Thessalonica. There is moot evidence that the Bulgarian church opposed the marriage and that a patriarch (called either Spiridon or Vissarion) was deposed or executed by the irate tsar. Akropolites recorded two lists about Ivan Asen's children by his third (or second) wife, Irene Komnene Doukaina. Irene gave birth to

- "Michael Asen, Theodora and Maria", according to the first list, but the second list mentioned "a son, Michael, and ... daughters, Maria and Anna". The discrepancy between the two lists can most plausibly resolved through the association of Theodora with Anna, as it was proposed by historian Ivan Božilov. Michael succeeded his half-brother, Kaliman, in 1246.
- One of the two daughters are supposed to have been given in marriage to sebastokrator Peter who was mentioned as Michael II Asen's brother-in-law in 1253. Peter's wife has traditionally been associated with Anna-Teodora, but she may have actually been identical with Maria, according to historian Ian Mladjov. Modern historians assume that Michael Shishman, Ivan Alexander and their successors were descended from Peter and his wife.
- Ivan Asen's second daughter by Irene was most probably the wife of the boyar Mitso. Mitso laid claim to Bulgaria after Michael II Asen died in 1256 or 1257. Historians who associates sebastokrator Peter's wife with Anna-Teodora say that Mitso married Maria, but Mladjov emphasizes that this identification is uncertain, and Mitso may have married Anna-Teodora. The Byzantine branch of the Asen family was descended from Mitso and his wife.

Family tree of Ivan Asen II
Ivan Asen I of Bulgaria | Elena-Evgenia
Ivan Asen II of Bulgaria
1.Anna (Anisia) | 2.Anna Maria of Hungary | 3.Irene Komnene Doukaina
1 | 1 | 2 | 2 | 2 | 2 | 3 | 3 | 3
Maria | Elena | Kaliman Asen I | Michael Asen | Maria
Beloslava | Thamar | Peter (?) | Anna-Teodora

== Legacy ==
Akropolites characterized Ivan Asen as "a man who proved to be excellent among barbarians not only with regard to his own people but also even with respect to foreigners". Historian Jean W. Sedlar described him as the "last really powerful ruler of Bulgaria". Being a successful military commander and a skillful diplomat, he conquered almost all lands that had been included in the First Bulgarian Empire during the reign of Simeon I. He also made sure that Hungary did not pose a major threat to Bulgaria.

The boyars' fear of punishment and their hunger for booty ensured their allegiance to Ivan Asen. However, these personal ties could not permanently secure the dominance of royal authority. The local boyars remained the actual rulers of the provinces because they controlled the collection of the taxes and the raising of troops. Ivan Asen's reign "ended at a moment of complete disaster", during the Mongol invasion of Europe. The Mongols invaded Bulgaria in 1242 and forced Bulgarians to pay a yearly tribute to them. The minority of Ivan Asen's successor gave rise to the formation of boyar factions and the neighboring powers quickly conquered the peripheral territories.

Ivan Asen II's seal is depicted on the reverse of the Bulgarian 2 lev banknote, issued in 1999 and 2005.

== See also ==
- Ivan Asen Point
- Ivan Asen Cove

== Sources ==
- Андреев (Andreev), Йордан (Jordan); Лалков (Lalkov), Милчо (Milcho) (1996). Българските ханове и царе [The Bulgarian Khans and Tsars] (in Bulgarian). Абагар (Abagar). ISBN 954-427-216-X.
- Андреев (Andreev), Йордан (Jordan); Лазаров (Lazarov), Иван (Ivan); Павлов (Pavlov), Пламен (Plamen) (2012). Кой кой е в средновековна България [Who is Who in Medieval Bulgaria] (in Bulgarian). Изток Запад (Iztok Zapad). ISBN 978-619-152-012-1.
- Canev, Stefan (2006). "6 (1218–1241) Zavoevateljat na duši. Car Ivan Asen II". Bǎlgarski hroniki (in Bulgarian). Trud, Žanet 45. ISBN 954-528-610-5.
- Crampton, R. J. (2005). A Concise History of Bulgaria. Cambridge University Press. ISBN 978-0-521-85085-8.
- Curta, Florin (2006). Southeastern Europe in the Middle Ages, 500–1250. Cambridge University Press. ISBN 978-0-521-85085-8.
- Delev, Petǎr; Valeri Kacunov; Plamen Mitev; Evgenia Kalinova; Iskra Baeva; Bojan Dobrev (2006). "16 Bǎlgarskata dǎržava pri Car Simeon; 10 Zlatnijat vek na bǎlgarskata kultura". storija i civilizacija za 11. klas (in Bulgarian). Trud, Sirma. ISBN 954-9926-72-9.
- Dimitrov, Božidar (1994). "Restoration and rise of the Bulgarian state and its hegemony on the Balkan Peninsula 1185–1246". Bulgaria: illustrated history. Sofia: Borina. ISBN 954-500-044-9. Archived from the original on 4 April 2007.
- Fajfrić, Željko (2000) [1998], Sveta loza Stefana Nemanje, Belgrade: Tehnologije, izdavastvo, agencija Janus
- Fine, John V. A. (1994). The Late Medieval Balkans: A Critical Survey from the Late Twelfth Century to the Ottoman Conquest. The University of Michigan Press. ISBN 0-472-08260-4.
- Georgieva, Sashka (2015). "Bulgarian-Hungarian marital diplomacy during the first half of the thirteenth century". Bulgaria Mediaevalis. 6 (1): 339–355. ISSN 1314-2941.
- Андреевич Ильинский, Григорий (4 February 1911). Грамоты болгарскихъ царей [Letters of Bulgarian Emperors] (in Russian). Moscow: Синодальная типография. Esp. pp. 13, 14.
- Lalkov, Milčo (1997). "Tsar Ivan Assen II (1218–1241)". Rulers of Bulgaria. Kibea. ISBN 954-474-098-8. Archived from the original on 4 April 2007.
- Madgearu, Alexandru (2017). The Asanids: The Political and Military History of the Second Bulgarian Empire, 1185–1280. BRILL. ISBN 978-9-004-32501-2.
- Mladjov, Ian S. R. (2012). "The Children of Ivan Asen II and Eirene Komnene". Bulgaria Mediaevalis. 3 (1): 485–500. ISSN 1314-2941.
- Petkov, Kiril (2008). The Voices of Medieval Bulgaria, Seventh-Fifteenth Century: The Records of a Bygone Culture. BRILL. ISBN 978-90-04-16831-2.
- Sedlar, Jean W. (1994). East Central Europe in the Middle Ages, 1000–1500. University of Washington Press. ISBN 0-295-97290-4.
- Varzos, Konstantinos (1984). Η Γενεαλογία των Κομνηνών [The Genealogy of the Komnenoi] (PDF) (in Greek). Vol. B. Thessaloniki: Centre for Byzantine Studies, University of Thessaloniki.
- Vásáry, István (2005). Cumans and Tatars: Oriental Military in the Pre-Ottoman Balkans, 1185–1365. Cambridge University Press. ISBN 0-521-83756-1.
- Vasiliev, Alexander (1952). "The role of Bulgaria in the Christian East under Tsar John Asen II". A History of the Byzantine Empire. Madison, Wisconsin: University of Wisconsin Press. OCLC 2323191.
- "2.1 Sǎzdavane i utvǎrždavane na Vtorata bǎlgarska dǎržava. Vǎzstanovenata dǎržavnost". Bǎlgarite i Bǎlgarija (in Bulgarian). Ministry of Foreign Affairs of Bulgaria, Trud, Sirma. 2005. Archived from the original on 7 September 2006.

Regnal titles
| Preceded by Boril | Emperor of Bulgaria; 1218–1241 | Succeeded by Kaliman Asen I |
