= List of wars involving Bulgaria =

This article lists the wars, campaigns and battles involving Bulgaria since its establishment around 680.

Bulgarian Victory (and allies)
Bulgarian Defeat (and allies)
Inconclusive

*e.g. result unknown or indecisive/inconclusive, result of internal conflict inside Bulgaria, status quo ante bellum, or a treaty or peace without a clear result.

== First Bulgarian Empire (680–1018) ==
Conflict	Combatant 1	Combatant 2	Result
First Bulgarian-Byzantine War (680–689)	Bulgarian Empire	Byzantine Empire	Victory: Khan Asparuh conquered Thrace; The First Bulgarian Empire formed and expanded
Battle of Anchialus (708) (708)	Bulgarian Empire	Byzantine Empire	Victory: Emperor Justinian II turned against Tervel but was defeated by the Bulgarian army; Justinian II was executed
Siege of Constantinople (717–718)	Bulgarian Empire	Umayyad Caliphate	Victory: Caesar Tervel annihilated roughly 25,000 Umayyad soldiers, forcing a surrender and retreat.; Tervel was canonized "Savior of Europe" by the Pope
Bulgarian Invasion of Avaria (804)	Bulgarian Empire	Avar Khaganate	Victory: Khan Krum fully subjugated the remainder of the Avar Empire
Second Bulgarian-Byzantine War (809–822)	Bulgarian Empire	Byzantine Empire	Victory: Emperor Krum defeated the massive Byzantine army, killing King Nicephorus I
Bulgarian-Frankish War (827–829)	Bulgarian Empire	Frankish Empire	Victory: King Omurtag defeated the Frankish fleet at the Drava river
First Bulgarian-Serbian War (839–842)	Bulgarian Empire	Serbian Principality	Defeat
Second Bulgarian-Serbian War; 853	Bulgarian Empire	Serbian Principality	Defeat
First Bulgarian-Croatian War (854)	Bulgarian Empire	Croatian Kingdom	Inconclusive: Peace treaty concluded with King Boris I
First Bulgarian-Hungarian War (862–896)	Bulgarian Empire	Hungarian Empire	Victory: The Bulgarian army under Boris I obliterated the Magyar army, forcing them north
Third Bulgarian-Byzantine War (894–896)	Bulgarian Empire	Byzantine Empire	Victory: The Bulgarian Empire expanded
Invasion of the Principality of Serbia by the pretender to the Serbian throne Klonimir backed by the Bulgarian Empire (897–898)	Bulgarian Empire Klonimir	Serbian Principality	Defeat: Rebellion supported by Tsar Simeon I was defeated, resulting in the death of Klonimir; Serbian-Bulgarian alliance was created; Petar Gojniković was recognized as a rightful ruler of Serbia
Fourth Bulgarian-Byzantine War (913–927)	Bulgarian Empire	Byzantine Empire	Victory: The Bulgarian Empire nearly conquered Constantinople
Third Bulgarian-Serbian War (917–924)	Bulgarian Empire	Serbian Principality Byzantine Empire	Victory: Emperor Simeon I and Bulgaria conquer Serbia
Second Bulgarian-Croatian War (926)	Bulgarian Empire	Croatian Kingdom	Defeat
Second Bulgarian-Hungarian War (932–980)	Bulgarian Empire	Hungarian Empire	Inconclusive: Bulgaria forced the migrating Hungarians to settle within the Pannonian Plain
Liberation of the Principality of Serbia from the Bulgar rule (933–934)	Bulgarian Empire	Serbian Principality	Defeat: Prince Česlav, with a small group of followers, took possession of the Serbian Principality and submitted to Byzantine emperor Romanos I Lekapenos
Bulgarian-Kievan Rus War (967–997)	Bulgarian Empire	Kievan Rus Empire Byzantine Empire	Inconclusive: Kievan Rus occupied areas of Northern Bulgaria; The Rus were defeated in a three-way war with Byzantium
Fifth Bulgarian-Byzantine War (968–1018)	Bulgarian Empire	Byzantine Empire	Defeat: The First Bulgarian Empire dissolved; Kingdom of Duklja became last remaining region left unconquered
Bulgarian invasion of Duklja (997)	Bulgarian Empire	Serbian Duklja	Victory: The Bulgarian Empire conquered Duklja and installed Jovan Vladimir as their vassal
Third Bulgarian-Croatian War (997–1000)	Bulgarian Empire	Croatian Kingdom	Defeat

== Second Bulgarian Empire (1185–1396) ==
Conflict	Combatant 1	Combatant 2	Result
Seventh Bulgarian-Byzantine War (1185–1201)	Bulgarian Empire	Byzantine Empire	Victory: The Bulgarian Empire resurfaced as a great power in Eastern Europe
Fourth Bulgarian-Serbian War (1202–1203)	Bulgarian Empire	Serbian Principality	Victory: The Bulgarian Empire under King Kaloyan pushed Serbia to the west
First Bulgarian–Latin War (1204–1208)	Bulgarian Empire	Latin Empire	Victory: The Latin Empire weakened, while the Bulgarian Empire enlarged
Battle of Klokotnitsa (1230)	Bulgarian Empire	Empire of Thessalonica	Victory: Bulgaria conquered the Empire of Thessalonica; Thessaly and Epirus became vassals of the Bulgarian Empire; Bulgaria emerged as a preeminent power in Southeast Europe
Mongol invasion of Bulgaria and Serbia (1241)	Bulgarian Empire	Golden Horde	Victory: The Bulgarian army pushed back Batu Khan's forces
Bulgarian Civil War (1277–1280)	Bulgarian Empire; Tsar Constantine; Allies: Byzantine Empire; Golden Horde	Bulgarian Empire; Tsar Ivaylo; Allies: Bulgarian rebels	Royal victory: Rebellion leader Ivaylo was murdered; George Terter I became emperor of Bulgaria
Fifth Bulgarian-Serbian War (1290–1291)	Bulgarian Empire	Serbian Kingdom	Defeat: Bulgaria lost the Belgrade and Branicevo provinces.
Fourth Bulgarian-Mongol War (1299–1300)	Bulgarian Empire	Golden Horde	Victory: Tsar Theodore Svetoslav expelled the Mongols to the east
Ninth Bulgarian-Byzantine War (1304–1305)	Bulgarian Empire	Byzantine Empire	Victory: The Bulgarian Empire conquered most of Thrace
Battle of Velbazhd (1330)	Bulgarian Empire	Serbian Kingdom	Defeat
Byzantine Civil War (1341–1347)	Byzantine Empire; John V Palaiologos; Allies: Bulgarian Empire; Serbian Empire	Byzantine Empire; John VI Kantakouzenos; Allies: Serbian Empire; Ottoman Empire	Victory: Kantakouzenos defeated regents and became emperor; The Bulgarian Empire gained northern Thrace
First Bulgarian–Ottoman War (1344–1371)	Bulgarian Empire	Ottoman Empire	Defeat: Bulgaria held off the Ottoman army until the Bulgarian betrayal of brothers
Second Bulgarian–Ottoman War (1371–1396)	Bulgarian Empire	Ottoman Empire	Defeat: The Bulgarian Empire fell

== Principality of Bulgaria (1878–1908) ==
Conflict	Combatant 1	Combatant 2	Result
Bulgarian-Serbian War (1885)	Principality of Bulgaria	Kingdom of Serbia	Victory
Macedonian Struggle (1893–1908)	Principality of Bulgaria	Kingdom of Greece Kingdom of Serbia Kingdom of Romania Ottoman Empire	Draw: Inconclusive result after Young Turk Revolution; Bulgaria gained full independence in 1908

== Kingdom of Bulgaria (1908–1946) ==
Conflict	Combatant 1	Combatant 2	Result
First Balkan War (1912–1913)	Balkan League: Kingdom of Bulgaria; Kingdom of Greece; Kingdom of Serbia; Kingdom of Montenegro	Ottoman Empire; Allies: Austria-Hungary; Albanian irregulars	Balkan League victory: The Ottoman Empire lost most remaining holdings in Europe; Bulgaria obtained control over Macedonia, northern Greece, Albania and southern Serbia; Treaty of London was signed
Second Balkan War (1913)	Kingdom of Bulgaria	Kingdom of Greece; Kingdom of Serbia; Kingdom of Romania; Kingdom of Montenegro Ottoman Empire	Defeat: Romanian and Ottoman intervention forced Bulgaria to ask for an armistice; Treaty of Bucharest and Treaty of Constantinople resulted in Bulgarian territorial cessions
World War I (1914–1918) (see Bulgaria during World War I)	Central Powers: German Empire; Ottoman Empire; Austria-Hungary; Kingdom of Bulgaria (from 1915)	Allied Powers: United States; Britain; Kingdom of Italy; Russian Empire; French Third Republic; Occupied by Central Powers: Kingdom of Greece; Kingdom of Serbia; Kingdom of Romania	Allied victory: Treaty of Neuilly-sur-Seine resulted in Bulgarian territorial cessions
Incident at Petrich (1925)	Kingdom of Bulgaria	Kingdom of Greece	Bulgarian diplomatic victory: League of Nations brokered a ceasefire and Greek withdrawal; Greece fined for violating Bulgarian territory; Bulgaria paid damages for shooting Greek soldiers
World War II (1941–1945) (see Bulgaria during World War II)	Allied Powers: Soviet Union; United States; United Kingdom; Kingdom of Italy (1943–45); French Third Republic (1939–40); Free France; Kingdom of Romania (1944–45); Kingdom of Bulgaria (1944–45); Kingdom of Greece (1940–45); Kingdom of Yugoslavia (1941)	Axis Powers: Nazi Germany; Empire of Japan; Kingdom of Italy (1939–43); Italian Social Republic (1943–45); Vichy France; Independent State of Croatia; Kingdom of Romania (1941–44); Kingdom of Bulgaria (1941–44)	Allied victory: The Bulgarian monarchy was abolished and replaced with a communist government; Southern Dobruja ceded to Bulgaria

== People's Republic of Bulgaria (1946–1990) ==
Conflict	Combatant 1	Combatant 2	Result
Warsaw Pact invasion of Czechoslovakia (1968)	Warsaw Pact: Soviet Union; Poland; Bulgaria; Hungary; Logistics support: East Germany (Note: Invasion canceled, troops prepared, part of the executive staff)	Czechoslovakia; Supported by: Albania Romania	Warsaw Pact victory: Czech reformist leaders were forced to sign Moscow Protocol, ending the Prague Spring

== Republic of Bulgaria (1990–) ==
Conflict	Combatant 1	Combatant 2	Result
Iraq War (2003–2011)	Iraq; NATO: United States; Bulgaria; other allies	Baath Loyalists; Islamic State of Iraq; Al-Qaeda; Islamic Army of Iraq Ba'athist Iraq	Coalition victory: The Ba'ath Party government was defeated and Saddam Hussein executed; Iraqi insurgency depleted and public security improved; Democratic elections were established and a new Shia-led government was formed; War between Iraq and the Islamic State broke out
2011 military intervention in Libya	NATO: United States; Bulgaria (one frigate as part of NATO contribution); other allies	Libya	NATO victory: NTC assumed interim control of Libya; Civil war broke out in Libya

== See also ==
- Byzantine–Bulgarian wars
- Bulgarian–Latin wars
- Bulgarian–Ottoman wars
- Bulgarian–Hungarian wars
- Bulgarian–Serbian wars
- Croatian–Bulgarian wars
- Medieval Bulgarian army
- Medieval Bulgarian navy
- Medieval warfare
