= Jacob Svetoslav =

Emperor (tsar) of Bulgaria

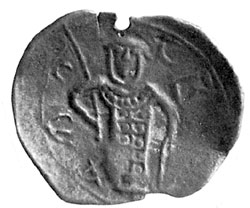
A coin minted by Jacob Svetoslav as an autonomous ruler, bearing his own image in military clothing

Jacob Svetoslav (Bulgarian: Яков Светослав, romanized: Yakov Svetoslav; c. 1210s/1220s – 1275 or 1276/1277) was a prominent 13th-century Bulgarian noble (bolyarin) of Russian origin. Bestowed the title of despot, Jacob Svetoslav was the ruler of a widely autonomous domain of the Second Bulgarian Empire most likely located around Sofia. Seeking further independence and claiming the title of Emperor of Bulgaria, he twice changed allegiance from Bulgaria to the Kingdom of Hungary and vice versa, and the Hungarians recognized his Bulgarian royal rank as their vassal and ruler of Vidin (medieval Bdin).

== Bulgarian despot ==
Jacob Svetoslav's exact origin is not clear, though he is known to have been either a Russian noble himself or the son of one. Jacob or his father most likely arrived in Bulgaria with the wave of Russian people fleeing the Mongol invasion of Rus' in the first half of the 13th century. Historian Plamen Pavlov theorizes that Jacob Svetoslav was a descendant of the princes (knyaze) of Kievan Rus', and estimates his birth date as being in the 1210s or 1220s. In the late 1250s, Jacob Svetoslav was already an influential noble. He married a daughter of Theodore II Laskaris from his marriage with Tsar Ivan Asen II's daughter Elena. By 1261, he had become a despot, a high-ranking noble in the Bulgarian hierarchy. The title was awarded to him probably by his own suzerain, the ruler of Bulgaria, rather than a Byzantine emperor, possibly Constantine Tih. Jacob Svetoslav was close to the Bulgarian court and pledged loyalty to Constantine. Thus, the tsar made him the ruler of a domain usually considered to have been south of the Vidin region in the west of the Bulgarian Empire. Byzantine sources indicate his possessions lay "near Haemus", thus close to Sofia, between the Hungarian possessions to the north and Macedonia to the south.

In 1261, he commanded the Bulgarian forces in a war against Hungary near Severin (western Wallachia), and in 1262 he possibly fought against Byzantium, as a Byzantine army invaded his lands in the following year during an anti-Bulgarian campaign. Jacob Svetoslav's continuing ties to his Russian homeland are evidenced by his request to the Bulgarian patriarch. Jacob requested the making of a copy of the Nomocanon which was then sent to Cyril III, the Metropolitan of Kiev. It was supplemented by a letter from Jacob in which the noble calls the metropolitan "the bishop of the entire Russian land... of my ancestors". The copy finishes with a passage in which Jacob is called a "Bulgarian despot". He also minted his own coins bearing the imperfect images of Saint Demetrius of Thessaloniki or Jacob himself, dressed as a warrior wearing a helmet and holding a sword.

== Hungarian and Bulgarian ruler of Vidin ==
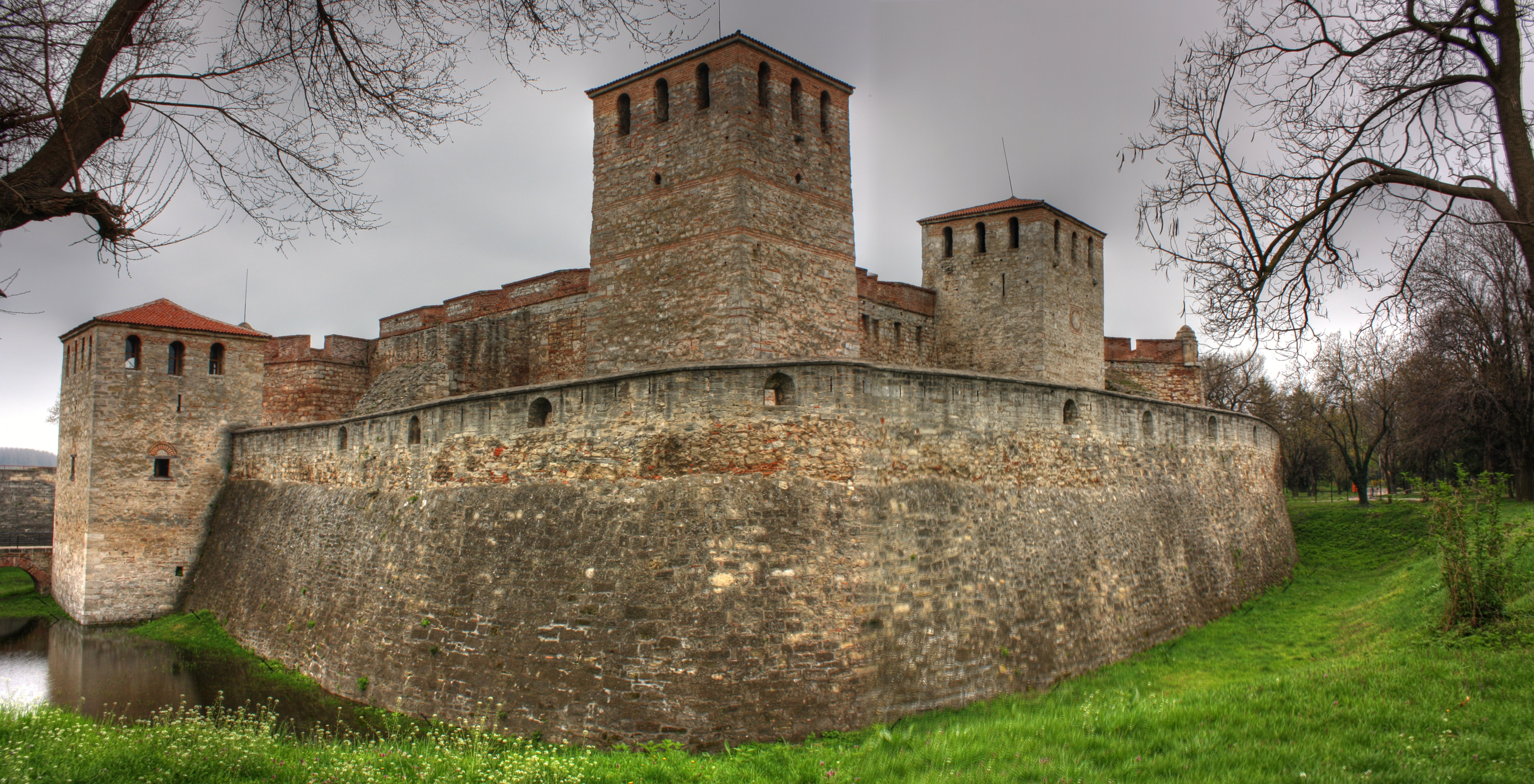
The Baba Vida castle in Vidin is widely regarded to have been Jacob Svetoslav's capital

In 1263, the situation in Bulgaria was far from stable, as Constantine was facing both the threat of his predecessor Mitso Asen's ambitions for the throne and a large-scale Byzantine invasion. Because Constantine was unable to assist Jacob against the advancing Byzantines, Jacob sought aid from his northern neighbour, Hungarian king Stephen V. The Hungarians drove the Byzantines out of Jacob's domain and themselves invaded Byzantine-controlled territories. Rescued from the Byzantine threat, Jacob Svetoslav submitted to Hungarian suzerainty. Stephen V placed him as the ruler of the Vidin province on the Danube River, previously governed for Hungary by the then-deceased Rostislav Mikhailovich, and allowed him to retain his lands to the south. Had it not been for the appointment of Jacob Svetoslav as a Hungarian vassal at Vidin, Bulgaria would have re-established control over the city in 1263.

In 1264, however, Hungary was precipitated into another civil war between Stephen V and his father Béla IV. Fearing Bulgarian retribution and lack of Hungarian support should Béla IV come out victorious, in 1265 Jacob Svetoslav changed allegiance to Bulgaria and acknowledged the authority of Constantine Tih. The two crossed the Danube in 1265 and raided the Hungarian fortresses north of the river. By the spring of 1266, however, Stephen V had established himself as the sole ruler of Hungary, and on 23 June 1266, conquered Vidin back from Jacob after a brief siege. Two waves of Hungarian raids proceeded to devastate the Vidin province and enter the possessions of Constantine. In spite of Bulgarian resistance, the Hungarians subjugated a number of cities including Pleven. Jacob Svetoslav's previous defection to Bulgarian suzerainty notwithstanding, the Hungarians restored him as the puppet ruler of the Vidin region. In 1266, he was even referred to as "Tsar of the Bulgarians" (imperator Bulgarorum) in Hungarian sources, possibly to encourage a rivalry between Constantine and Jacob Svetoslav for the Bulgarian throne or simply to satisfy Jacob's ambitions.

== Final submission to Bulgaria and death ==
The death of Stephen V in 1272 meant that he was succeeded by his infant son Ladislaus IV, with the widowed consort and mother of the boy, Elizabeth, as his regent. At the time, Jacob Svetoslav still held Vidin as a Hungarian vassal. Possibly in 1273, Hungarian rule in Braničevo, west of Jacob's domain, was put to an end by two Cuman–Bulgarian nobles, Darman and Kudelin. Cut off from his Hungarian suzerains and facing the menace of a Bulgarian attack from the east, Jacob Svetoslav once again submitted to Bulgarian rule. He arrived in the capital Tarnovo to negotiate his submission with Constantine's consort Maria Palaiologina Kantakouzene, who was the dominant figure in the empire at the time due to the Tsar's paralysis. There, Jacob was formally adopted by the much younger Maria as her second son, after the infant heir Michael Asen II. This adoption solidified Jacob's ties to the court and meant that he could safely retain his autonomous domain as a Bulgarian vassal. He also harboured hopes to ascend to the throne by ousting Michael when Constantine died. Suspicious of these disloyal intentions of Jacob's, Constantine's consort Maria is thought to have poisoned him, and he died in 1275 or 1276/1777, shortly before the Uprising of Ivaylo.

While the fate of the city of Vidin itself is unclear, at least part of Jacob's possessions were certainly restored to direct Bulgarian rule in the wake of his death. One such territory was the Svrljig region lying southwest of Vidin, which in 1278 was documented as belonging to Bulgaria.

== Sources ==
- Engel, Pál; Andrew Ayton; Tamás Pálosfalvi (2005). Andrew Ayton (ed.). The realm of St. Stephen: a history of medieval Hungary, 895–1526. I.B.Tauris. ISBN 978-1-85043-977-6.
- Fine, John Van Antwerp (1994). The Late Medieval Balkans: A Critical Survey from the Late Twelfth Century to the Ottoman Conquest. University of Michigan Press. pp. 175–184. ISBN 978-0-472-08260-5.
- Бакалов, Георги; Милен Куманов (2003). "Яков Светослав (неизв.–около 1276)". Електронно издание "История на България" (CD) (in Bulgarian). София: Труд, Сирма. ISBN 954528613X.
- Златарски, Васил (1970). "Отношенията къмъ Маджарско и Византия при царь Константинъ Асѣня". In Петър Хр. Петров (ed.). История на българската държава през средните векове (in Bulgarian). София: Наука и изкуство. OCLC 405296440.
- Павлов, Пламен (2005). "Руски "бродници", политически бегълци и военачалници през XII-XIV в.". Бунтари и авантюристи в средновековна България (in Bulgarian). Варна: LiterNet. ISBN 954-304-152-0.
