= Michael Doukas Glabas Tarchaneiotes =

- Born: c. 1235
- Died: between 1305 and 1308
- Burial place: Pammakaristos Church
- Spouse: Maria Doukaina Komnene Branaina Palaiologina
- Military career
- Allegiance: Byzantine Empire
- Service years: c. 1260–1304
- Rank: protostrator
- Wars: Byzantine–Bulgarian wars; Bulgarian campaigns of Michael VIII; Byzantine–Serbian wars

Michael Doukas Glabas Tarchaneiotes or Michael Tarchaneiotes Glabas (Greek: Μιχαὴλ Δοῦκας Γλαβᾶς Ταρχανειώτης; c. 1235 – after 1304) was a notable Byzantine aristocrat and general. He served under emperors Michael VIII Palaiologos and Andronikos II Palaiologos in the Balkans, fighting against the Second Bulgarian Empire, Serbia, the Angevins of Naples and the Despotate of Epirus. He is also notable as the patron of several churches, most notably the Pammakaristos Church in Constantinople (mod. Istanbul), where he was buried.

== Life ==
=== Military career ===
Michael Doukas Glabas Tarchaneiotes was born c. 1235, and is first mentioned in c. 1260/62, when he was assigned to capture the city of Mesembria on the Black Sea coast from the deposed Bulgarian tsar Mitso Asen (r. 1256–1257), during Michael VIII's counteroffensives against Bulgaria. In c. 1263 he defeated a Bulgarian army at Bizye, fortified Brysis, and proceeded to capture the fortresses Skopos, Petra and Skopelos, and the cities of Agathopolis, Sozopolis, Debeltos and Anchialos.

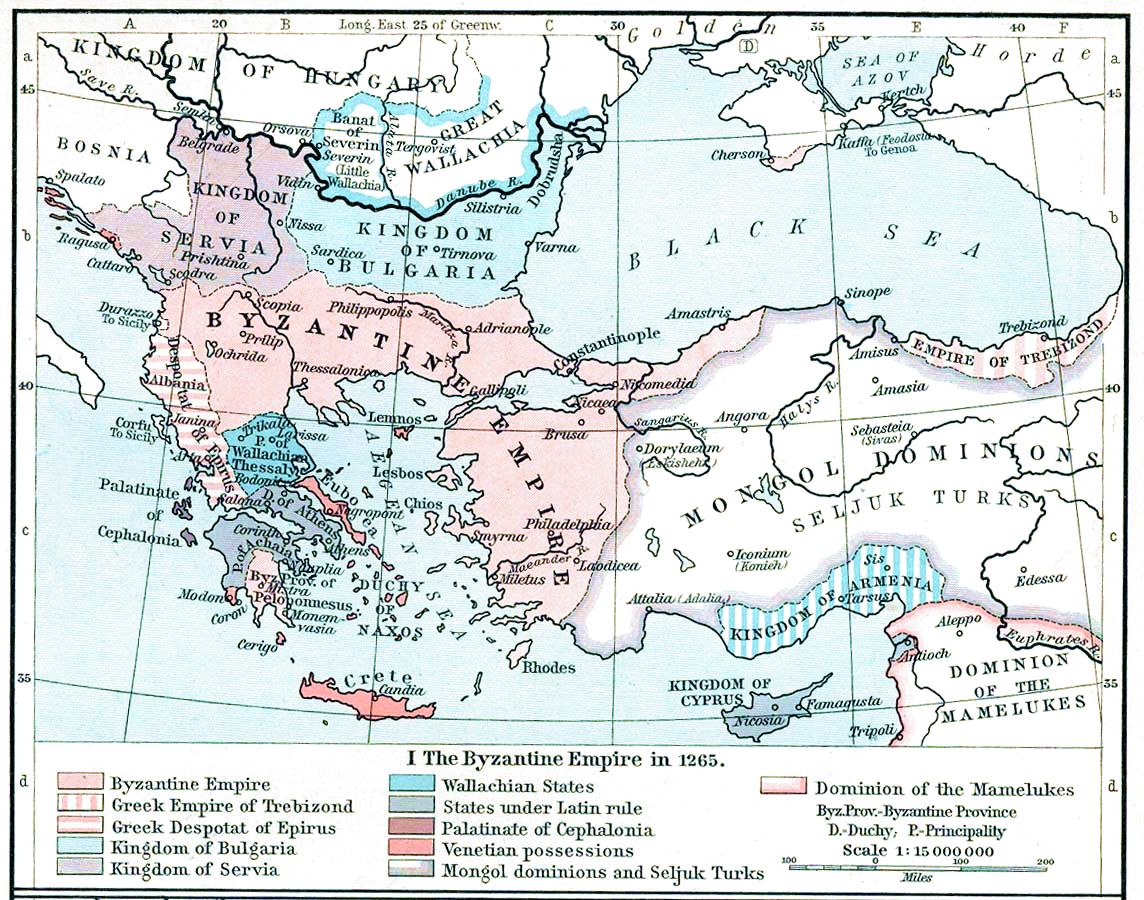
Map of the Byzantine Empire and its neighbours c. 1265

He re-appears in 1278–79, leading another campaign against Bulgaria, where a successful revolt against Tsar Constantine Tikh had placed Ivaylo on the throne. Upon hearing this, Emperor Michael VIII sent Glabas at the head of an army to put the exiled prince Ivan Asen III on the Bulgarian throne. Glabas managed to capture the Bulgarian capital, Tarnovo, where he seized Ivaylo's Byzantine wife, Maria, and their son Michael. He then pursued Ivaylo to the fortress of Silistra, which he besieged but failed to take. Eventually, however, with aid from Nogai Khan, Ivaylo managed to defeat and drive back the Byzantines. In 1282, the Serbs invaded Byzantine territory in northern Macedonia, and the new emperor, Andronikos II Palaiologos (r. 1282–1328), sent Glabas against them with 4,000 Tartar auxiliaries. Although the Tartars raided Serbia, the Serbs were still able to conquer much of northern Macedonia, including Skopje.

Sometime between 1284 and 1291 Glabas was sent to Albania, where he fought against the Angevins and recovered Dyrrhachion, Kruja and Kanina. Later, possibly in 1292, he defeated the sebastokrator Theodore, younger brother of the ruler of Thessaly, Constantine Doukas, and unsuccessfully besieged the Epirote capital, Ioannina. During this time, he steadily rose in the imperial hierarchy, occupying progressively higher titles: from primmikerios of the court (33rd in the hierarchy), he became megas papias (22nd), kouropalates (19th) in 1262, pinkernes (15th) by 1282, megas konostaulos (12th) from 1282, and finally, sometime between 1297 and 1304 (probably c. 1302/3), protostrator (8th, but in essence the commander-in-chief of the army as the nominally superior megas domestikos had become an honorific post).

In 1297/8, Glabas was named as the governor of the western part of the Empire, with Thessalonica as his seat, and sent to deal with the Serbs, who had continued periodically attacking Byzantine holdings in Macedonia and Albania since 1282. As recently as 1296, they had conquered Dyrrhachion. Despite his great military experience and his disposing of a relatively strong army, Glabas was unable to make any headway as the Serbs relied on guerrilla tactics and refused a pitched battle. Consequently, he advised Emperor Andronikos II to conclude a peace agreement with Stephen Uroš II (r. 1282–1321). This led to the treaty of 1299 between the two states, sealed through the marriage of Andronikos II's daughter Simonida to Stephen Uroš. After his lacklustre performance in Macedonia, Glabas returned east, and in c. 1302/3 he is said to have built or rebuilt fifteen fortresses in Thrace. In 1304, Glabas was dispatched to counter a Bulgarian invasion under Tsar Theodore Svetoslav (r. 1300–1322), which took several forts and cities along the Balkan Mountains and the Black Sea coast. Glabas had some success: according to a panegyric by the court poet Manuel Philes, he retook Roussokastron and Mesembria, rebuilt Anchialos and forced the Bulgarians to withdraw behind the Balkan Mountains. At this juncture, however, he fell ill and returned to Constantinople, while the co-emperor Michael IX Palaiologos (r. 1294–1320) assumed command.

=== Monastic life and death ===
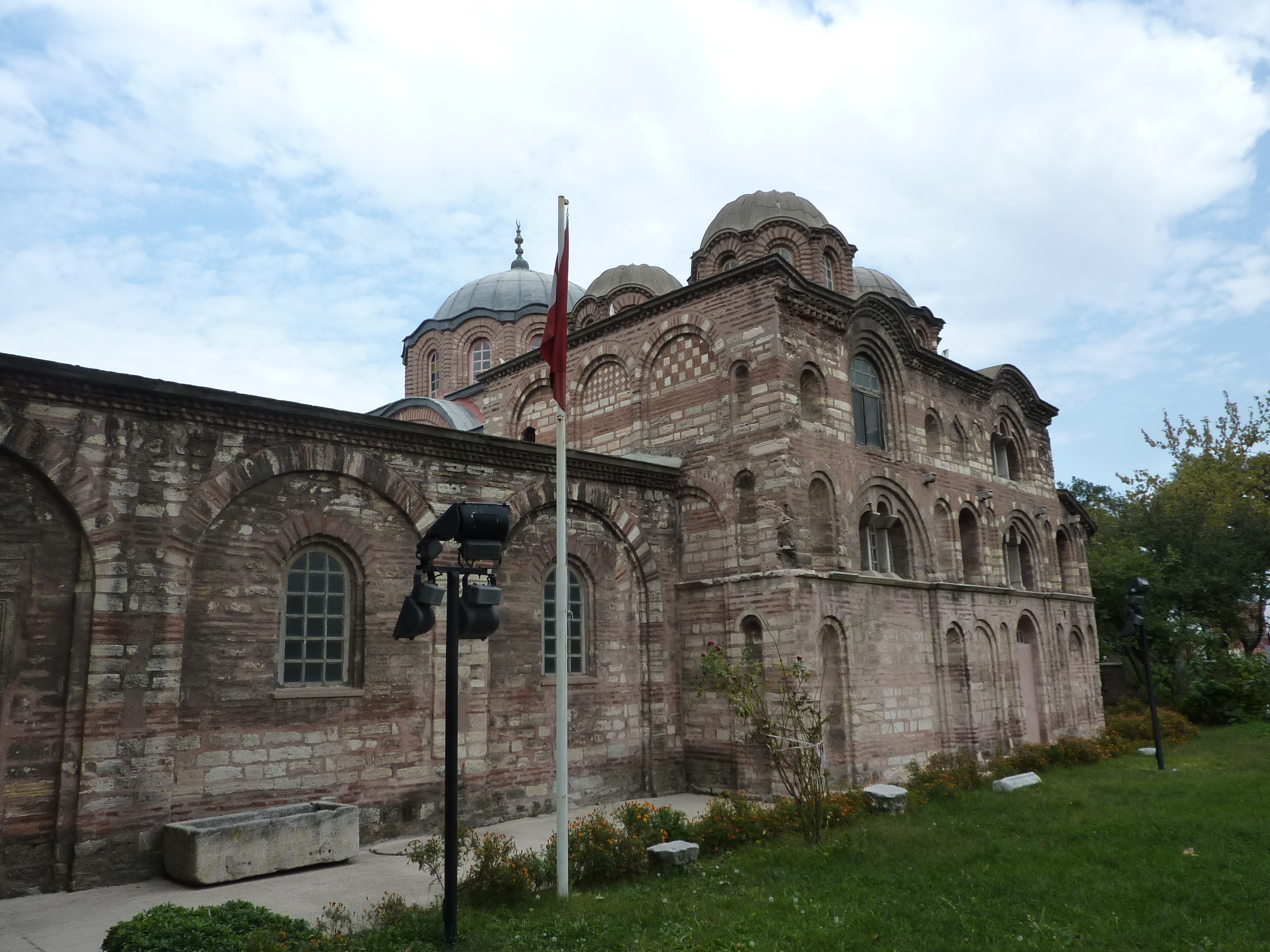
The Pammakaristos Church, which Glabas restored and where he was later buried, as it is today.

It is not known when Glabas died, but it was probably sometime between 1305 and 1308. Before his death, he became a monk. He was buried by his widow in a small chapel in the Pammakaristos Church in Constantinople, which he and his wife had restored and handed over to Patriarch John XII of Constantinople in 1293. The church was possibly decorated with a fresco cycle celebrating his military exploits, described by Philes. Glabas and his wife funded several other churches from their wealth: in 1302/3 they had also sponsored the restoration of a chapel to St. Euthymius in the Church of St. Demetrius in Thessalonica, as well as the Prisklabetza Monastery at Prilep and the Atheniotissa Church in Constantinople, where he also funded the construction of a hospice.

== Family ==
Glabas married Maria Doukaina Komnene Branaina Palaiologina. They had one daughter, whose name is not documented. She married Andronikos Komnenos Branas Doukas Angelos. After Glabas' death, his wife became a nun with the name Martha. Chandrenos is identified by historian Athanasios Papadopoulos-Kerameus as having married Theodote Glabaina Tarchaneiotissa (a probable daughter of Michael Doukas Glabas Tarchaneiotes and Maria Doukaina Komnene Branaina Palaiologina). Papadopoulos-Kerameus states that they were the parents of Theodora Palaiologina Angelina and thus the maternal grandparents of Emperor John VI Kantakouzenos.

== Assessment ==
Michael Doukas Glabas Tarchaneiotes has often been confused, including in relatively modern studies, with the protovestiarios Michael Tarchaneiotes, a nephew of Michael VIII Palaiologos (r. 1259–1282) who was killed in 1283. Glabas was remembered by his contemporaries as an excellent soldier: the historian Nikephoros Gregoras claims that his military experience made the other generals "look like children". Philes also records that he had written a now lost treatise on "various military topics", one of the last attested examples in the long tradition of Byzantine military manuals.

== Sources ==
- Bartusis, Mark C. (1997). The Late Byzantine Army: Arms and Society 1204–1453. Philadelphia, Pennsylvania: University of Pennsylvania Press. ISBN 0-8122-1620-2.
- Cavallo, Guglielmo (1997). The Byzantines. Chicago, Illinois: University of Chicago Press. ISBN 0-226-09792-7.
- Fine, John V. A. (1994) [1987]. The Late Medieval Balkans: A Critical Survey from the Late Twelfth Century to the Ottoman Conquest. Ann Arbor, Michigan: University of Michigan Press. ISBN 978-0-472-10079-8.
- Kazhdan, Alexander, ed. (1991). The Oxford Dictionary of Byzantium. Oxford and New York: Oxford University Press. ISBN 0-19-504652-8.
- Laiou, Angeliki E. (1972). Constantinople and the Latins: The Foreign Policy of Andronicus II, 1282–1328. Cambridge, Massachusetts: Harvard University Press. ISBN 9780674165359.
- Nicol, Donald M. (1968). The Byzantine Family of Kantakouzenos (Cantacuzenus), ca. 1100–1460: A Genealogical and Prosopographical Study. Dumbarton Oaks studies 11. Washington, DC: Dumbarton Oaks Center for Byzantine Studies.
- Trapp, Erich; Beyer, Hans-Veit; Kaplaneres, Sokrates; Leontiadis, Ioannis (1991). "27504. Ταρχανειώτης, Μιχαὴλ ∆ούκας Γλαβᾶς". Prosopographisches Lexikon der Palaiologenzeit (in German). Vol. 11. Vienna: Verlag der Österreichischen Akademie der Wissenschaften. ISBN 3-7001-3003-1.
