= Battle of Devina =

1279 battle in the Balkans

Battle of Devnya
- Part of the Uprising of Ivaylo and the Byzantine–Bulgarian wars
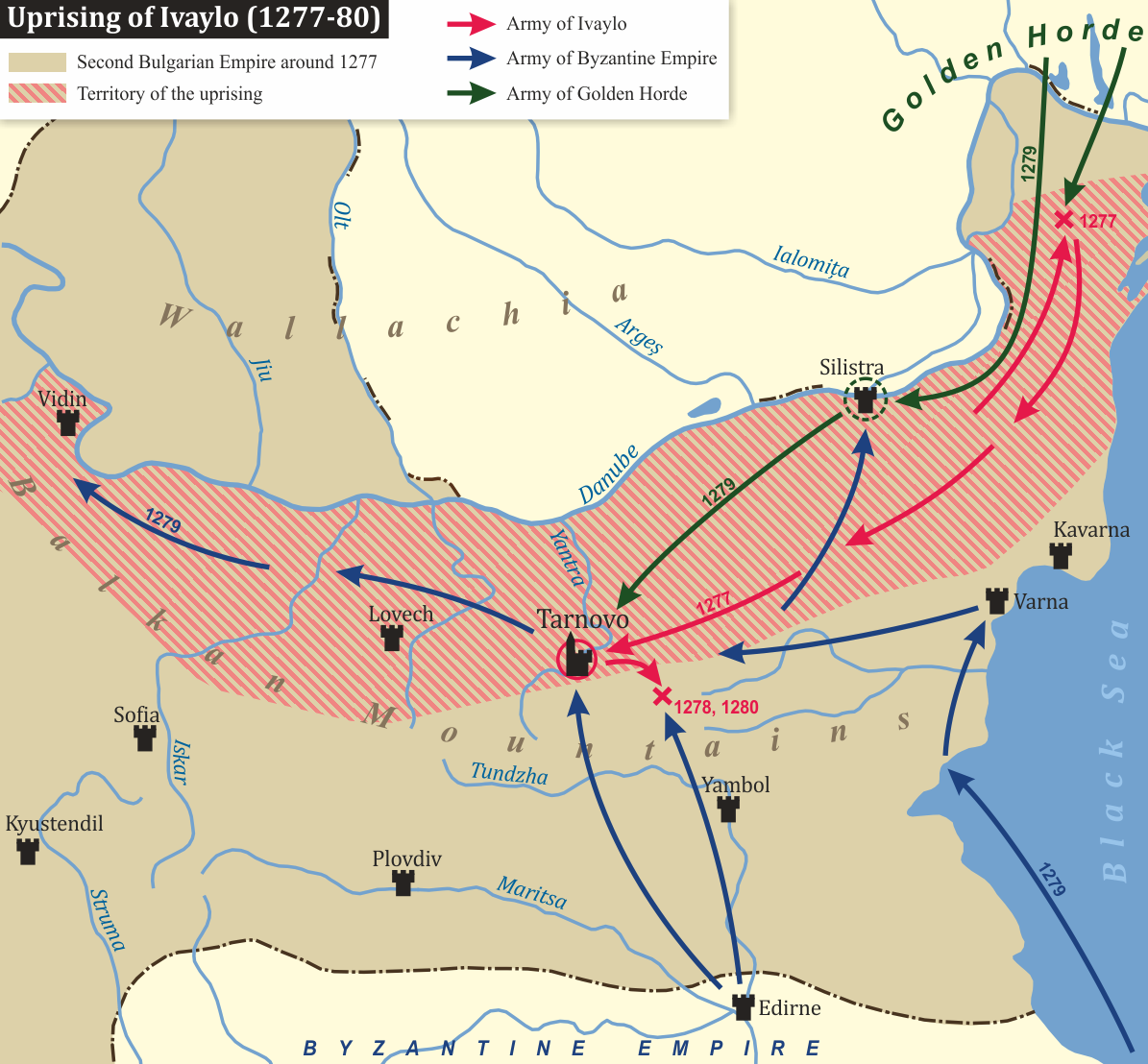
- Map of the battles and movements during the uprising of Ivaylo
| Date | 17 July 1279 |
| Location | Devina, near Kotel Bulgaria 42°55′N 26°27′E |
| Result | Bulgarian victory |

Belligerents
| Bulgarian Empire | Byzantine Empire |

Commanders and leaders
| Ivailo of Bulgaria | Murin |

Strength
| 5000 men | 10,000 men |

Casualties and losses
| Light casualties | 10,000 troops |

The Battle of Devina occurred on 17 July 1279 near the small fortress of Devina, close to the modern town of Kotel, Burgas Province, south-eastern Bulgaria. Ivailo of Bulgaria attacked the Byzantine army sent to help his rival for the crown Ivan Asen III.

== Origins of the conflict ==
In 1277 in a popular uprising led by Ivailo broke out in north-eastern Bulgaria against the incapability of Emperor Constantine Tikh Asen to cope with the constant Mongol invasions which devastated the country for years. The Byzantine Emperor Michael VIII Palaiologos decided to make use of the instability in Bulgaria. He sent an army to impose his ally Ivan Asen III on the throne. Ivan Asen III gained control of the area between Vidin and Cherven. Ivailo was besieged by the Mongols at Drastar (Silistra) and the nobility in the capital Tarnovo accepted Ivan Asen III for Emperor.

== Battle ==
In the same year, however, Ivailo managed to make a breakthrough in Drastar and headed for the capital. In order to help his ally, Michael VIII sent a 10,000-strong army towards Bulgaria under Murin. When Ivailo learned of that campaign he abandoned his march to Tarnovo. Although his troops were outnumbered, the Bulgarian leader attacked Murin in the Kotel Pass on 17 July 1279 and the Byzantines were completely routed. Many of them perished in the battle, while the rest were captured and later killed by orders from Ivailo.

== Aftermath ==
After the defeat Michael VIII sent another army of 5,000 troops under Aprin but it was also defeated by Ivailo before reaching the Balkan Mountains. Without support, Ivan Asen III had to flee to Constantinople. The internal conflict in Bulgaria continued to 1280 when Ivailo had in turn to flee to the Mongols and George I Terter ascended to the throne.

== Sources ==
- Angelov, D., Cholpanov, B. Bulgarian military history in the Middle Ages (X-XV century), Published by BAN, Sofia 1994, pp. 167–168
- Zlatarski, Vasil (1971) [1927]. История на българската държава през средните векове. Том I. История на Първото българско царство, Част II. От славянизацията на държавата до падането на Първото царство (852—1018) [History of Bulgaria in the Middle Ages. Vol. 1. History of the First Bulgarian Empire, Part 2.From the Slavicization of the state to the fall of the First Empire (852—1018)]. Sofia: Nauka i izkustvo. OCLC 67080314., pp. 568-572
