= Irene Palaiologina, Empress of Bulgaria =

Irene

Empress consort of Bulgaria
- Tenure: 1279–1280
- Born: Unknown; Byzantine Empire
- Died: Unknown; Byzantine Empire
- Spouse: Ivan Asen III of Bulgaria
- Issue: Michael Asen; Andronikos Asen; Isaac Asan; Manuel Asen; Constantine Asen; Theodora Asanina; Maria Asenina
- Dynasty: Palaiologos
- Father: Michael VIII Palaiologos
- Mother: Theodora Palaiologina

Irene Palaiologina (Greek: Εἰρήνη Παλαιολογίνα, Bulgarian: Ирина Палеологина) was the eldest daughter of Byzantine emperor Michael VIII Palaiologos and empress Theodora Palaiologina, and empress consort of Ivan Asen III of Bulgaria.

== Life ==
Fearing the rapid success of Ivaylo's revolt in Bulgaria, Michael VIII summoned Ivan Asen, a descendant of Bulgaria's ruling dynasty living at the Byzantine Empire (he was the son of Mitso Asen, who reigned in 1256–57), granted him the title of despotes, and married him to Irene in 1277 or 1278. Michael VIII then sent several Byzantine armies in an attempt to install Ivan Asen III on the throne. This caused an alliance between Ivaylo and the dowager Bulgarian empress Maria Kantakouzene: she married Ivaylo, who was recognized as Bulgarian emperor in 1278, without deposing or disinheriting the young Michael Asen II, her son by the late Constantine Tikh, whom Ivaylo killed at the beginning of the revolt. Although Ivaylo defeated several of Michael VIII's attempts to depose him, he was blockaded for three months in Drăstăr (Silistra) by the Mongol allies of Michael VIII. In the interval a Byzantine force besieged the Bulgarian capital, Tarnovo, and, hearing a rumor of Ivaylo's death in battle, the local nobility surrendered and accepted Ivan Asen III as emperor in 1279 and Irene became the new empress consort of Bulgaria.

Although the ex-tsaritsa Maria Kantakouzene and her son were sent to exile in Byzantium, Ivan Asen III and Irene failed to assert themselves throughout the country. Byzantine authors say that the tsar and the tsarina did not feel comfortable living in the palace where they had been surrounded by еnemies. Ivaylo reappeared before the walls of the capital and defeated two Byzantine attempts to relieve Ivan Asen III. In 1280, Ivan Asen and Irene secretly fled Tarnovo with choice treasures taken from the palace treasury, including pieces captured from defeated Byzantine emperors in former victories. Reaching Mesembria (Nesebar), the imperial couple sailed for Constantinople, where the enraged Michael VIII refused to receive them for days for their cowardice.

George Pachymeres reports that in 1305 Irene Palaiologina attempted to arrange a mutiny against her brother Andronikos II Palaiologos in revenge for the assassination of her son-in-law Roger de Flor. The plot was uncovered and Irene was placed under house arrest.

== Family ==
By her marriage with Ivan Asen, Irene Palaiologina had several children:

1. Michael Asen, titular emperor of Bulgaria.
2. Andronikos Asen, father of Irene Asanina, wife of John VI Kantakouzenos.
3. Isaac Asen.
4. Manuel Asen.
5. Constantine Asen.
6. Theodora Asenina, who married Fernan Jimenez d'Aunez and then Manuel Tagares.
7. Maria Asenina, who married Roger de Flor.

They became the progenitors of the large and influential Asen/Asanes family Asen in the Byzantine Empire, which prospered in various court and provincial offices until the end of the empire and its dependencies in the mid-15th century. One of Irene's descendants, Irene Asanina (daughter of her son Andronikos Asen) married the future Byzantine Emperor John VI Kantakouzenos and through their daughter Helena (who married emperor John V Palaiologos), became the ancestress of later Byzantine emperors.

== Sources ==
- Fine, John V. A. (1994) [1987]. The Late Medieval Balkans: A Critical Survey from the Late Twelfth Century to the Ottoman Conquest. Ann Arbor, Michigan: University of Michigan Press. ISBN 978-0-472-10079-8.
- Bozhilov, Ivan (1994). Familiyata na Asenevtsi (1186–1460) (in Bulgarian) (2nd phototypical ed.). Sofia: Bulgarian Academy of Sciences. ISBN 954-430-264-6.

Irene Palaiologina, Empress of Bulgaria Palaiologos Born: ? Died: ?
Royal titles
Preceded by Maria Kantakouzene	Empress consort of Bulgaria; 1279–1280	Succeeded by Kira Maria of Bulgaria
