= Maria Palaiologina Kantakouzene =

Empress consort of Bulgaria from 1269 to 1279

Empress consort of Bulgaria
- Tenure: 1269–1279
- Born: Possibly 1249; Nicaea, Empire of Nicaea (modern-day İznik, Turkey)
- Died: After 1294; Constantinople, Byzantine Empire (modern-day Istanbul, Turkey)
- Spouses: Alexios Philes; Constantine Tikh of Bulgaria; Ivaylo of Bulgaria
- Issue: Michael Asen II
- House: Kantakouzenos
- Father: John Kantakouzenos
- Mother: Irene Komnene Palaiologina

Maria Palaiologina Kantakouzene (Bulgarian: Мария Палеологина Кантакузина, Greek: Μαρία Παλαιολογίνα Καντακουζηνή; died after 1294) was an Empress consort of Bulgaria by marriage to two Bulgarian emperors, Constantine Tikh and Ivaylo. She was a niece of Michael VIII Palaiologos.

She is referred to as the most powerful empress of Bulgaria. She ruled as regent from 1271 to 1279 on behalf of her minor son, Michael Asen II, who was made co-regent of her first spouse, and remained co-regent during the reign of her second spouse.

== Family ==
Maria was the second daughter of John Kantakouzenos and Irene Komnene Palaiologina, sister of Michael VIII Palaiologos.

According to George Pachymeres, Maria was unusually perfidious and sly and she had a strong influence over the people and the clergy. He would have it that Maria supported her uncle's military coup d'etat and she prompted him to blind the legitimate emperor John IV Laskaris, who was brother of Bulgarian empress Irene, second wife of tsar Constantine Tikh of Bulgaria.

== Empress consort of Bulgaria ==
=== Wife of Constantine Tikh ===
The deposition and blinding of the minor Nicaean emperor John IV Laskaris by Michael VIII Palaiologos in 1261 pitted Constantine Tikh, as the brother-in-law of the deposed emperor, against Michael VIII.

After the death of tsarina Irene Laskarina in 1268 Constantine Tikh sought a reconciliation with Michael VIII by proposing to marry a Byzantine princess related to Palaiologos, and Michael VIII offered his niece Maria. Maria had one previous marriage, to Alexios Philes, and Constantine Tikh had two. As a condition for the marriage alliance, the Black Sea ports of Mesembria and Anchialos were to be handed over as her dowry.

Maria and Constantine Tikh married in 1269. However, quarrels over the surrender of Maria's promised dowry soured the improved relationship. Maria realized that the behaviour of her uncle would undermine her position in the Bulgarian court, so she openly put up her husband to attack Michael VIII. The Bulgarian government entered into an alliance with King Charles I of Sicily who was planning a campaign against Michael VIII with the object of restoring the Latin Empire. Michael VIII responded by marrying his illegitimate daughter Euphrosyne Palaiologina to Nogai Khan of the Golden Horde, who, as a Byzantine ally, pillaged Bulgaria in 1274.

=== Regent ===
In the last years of his reign, Constantine Tikh was partly paralyzed from a fall off his horse, and suffered from unspecified ailments. The government was firmly in the hands of Maria Kantakouzene, who crowned their son Michael Asen II co-emperor soon after his birth, in about 1272. As such, she acted in his behalf as regent. Maria presided over relations with the Byzantine Empire in the 1270s, and engineered first the submission and then the murder (by poison) of the despotēs Yakov Svetoslav of Vidin, a strong pretender for the Bulgarian crown, in 1275. The tsarina invited Yakov Svetoslav to Tarnovo, promising to adopt him and to allow him to participate in the governing of the country. In 1275 Yakov Svetoslav arrived at Tarnovo and he indeed proclaimed as the second son of Maria in an official ceremony, officiated by patriarch Ignatiy of Bulgaria. Yakov died soon after his return to Vidin. George Pachymeres accused Maria for his death.

Due to the expensive and unsuccessful wars, repeated Mongol raids, and economic instability, Maria's government was faced with a revolt in 1277; the Uprising of Ivaylo. What is clear is that a swineherd or swine-owner named Ivaylo became a leader of the discontented and attracted many (presumably mostly lower-class) followers, asserting his control over a significant area. Tsar Constantine set out against Ivaylo with his guard, but was decisively defeated and slain in his chariot in 1277. Ivaylo himself is credited with the killing.

Although he was able to extend his authority across much of the country, he also met with resistance, and the capital Tarnovo remained under the control of the legitimate emperor Michael Asen II and his mother Maria Kantakouzene.

=== Wife of Ivaylo ===
Ivaylo's successes troubled the Byzantine Emperor Michael VIII Palaiologos, who married his eldest daughter Irene to Ivan Asen III, a descendant of Bulgaria's ruling dynasty living at the Byzantine court, and dispatched troops to place him on the throne. This caused an alliance between Ivaylo and Maria Kantakouzena, and the widowed empress married Ivaylo, who was recognized as Bulgarian emperor in 1278, without deposing or disinheriting the minor Michael Asen II.

Maria's decision was defined by Byzantines as "indecent" and "impure", because she, a descendant of the noble Palaiologos and Kantakouzenos families, had married a swineherd, who had moreover killed her husband. In this connection Michael VIII declared openly that Maria "had brought disgrace on her family" and she "had destroyed her kingdom".

The marriage of Ivaylo and Maria was allegedly unhappy. Ivaylo led a successful defense of the Balkan passes against the Byzantine campaigns to establish Ivan Asen III on the Bulgarian throne. Ivaylo had also met with success against casual Mongol raids, but in 1279 a major Mongol army blockaded him in the fortress of Dorostolon (Silistra) on the Danube for three months. A rumor of Ivaylo's death caused panic in Tarnovo, where the nobility surrendered to a new Byzantine army and accepted Ivan Asen III as emperor. Ivan Asen III was enthroned, while Michael Asen II and Maria Kantakouzena, who was pregnant by Ivaylo, were sent into exile to Constantinople.

Maria Kantakouzene and Ivaylo had a daughter, whose name is unknown. (Note: Maria Kantakouzene featured as the narrator of the Ivaylo campaign in the video game, Age of Empires II: Definitive Edition, while she was telling the story to her daughter.)

== Ancestors ==
Andronikos; Doukas Komnenos Palaiologos	Theodora; Angelina Palaiologina
Joannes; Komnenos Angelos Kantakouzenos	Eulogia (Irene) Palaiologina
1 Constantine Tikh	Maria; Palaiologina Kantakouzene	2 Ivaylo
1	2
Michael Asen II	daughter

== Sources ==
- Vasil Zlatarski, "История на българската държава през средните векове. Том III. Второ българско царство. България при Асеневци (1187—1280)" издателство "Наука и изкуство", София 1972 г.
- Yordan Andreev, Ivan Lazarov, Plamen Pavlov, "Кой кой е в средновековна България", издателство "Петър Берон", 1999 г.

Maria Palaiologina Kantakouzene Kantakouzenos Born: ? Died: ?
Royal titles
Preceded by Irene Laskarina of Nicaea	Empress consort of Bulgaria; 1269–1279	Succeeded by Irene Palaiologina of the Byzantine Empire
