= Srđan Pirivatrić =

Srđan Pirivatrić (Serbian Cyrillic: Срђан Пириватрић) is a Serbian historian and diplomat.

== Biography ==
He was born in 1966 in Belgrade. In 1984, Pirivatrić completed his secondary education, and in 1990 he graduated from the Belgrade University in History. In 1990-1995 he passed a post-graduate qualification at the same university, in the area of the History of Byzantium, and in 1995 Pirivatrić received a master's degree after defending of Master's thesis "Scope and Character of Samuil's state according to Byzantine sources", refuting the claims of Yugoslav and Macedonian historiographies about that state’s "Macedonian character" and acknowledging that it was the last stage of the existence of the First Bulgarian Empire.

Between 1989 and 1991, Pirivatrić was a librarian at the Byzantine Seminar at the Belgrade University's Philosophy Faculty. From 1991 to 1999, he was assistant professor at the Byzantine History Department at the same university, and in 1999-2000 he was a research fellow at the Institute of Byzantine Studies at the Serbian Academy of Sciences and Arts. Between 2001-2005, he was on a diplomatic service, and until 2003 he was First Secretary of the Serbia and Montenegro Embassy in Sofia, and until 2005 in Athens. After 2005, Pirivatrić became a research associate at the Institute of Byzantine Studies and a lecturer at Belgrade University. In 2013, he defended his PhD in history at Belgrade University. He is also a lecturer at the universities of Athens, Sofia and Thessaloniki. Author of some 50 scientific papers, published in Yugoslavia, Serbia, Bulgaria, Greece, France, Great Britain, Poland, Slovakia and Hungary.

He was given an award in 2009 by the president of Bulgaria Georgi Parvanov for his contribution to the good relation between the Bulgarian and the Serbian people.
