= Michael Tih =

Bulgarian emperor from 1277 to 1279

Tsar of Bulgaria
- Reign: 1272–1277 with Constantine Asen I 1277–1278 alone 1278–1279 with Ivajlo
- Coronation: 1272
- Predecessor: Constantine Asen I of Bulgaria
- Successor: Ivan Asen III
- Born: c. 1270
- Died: after 1303
- House: Asen dynasty, nominally
- Father: Constantine Asen I of Bulgaria
- Mother: Maria Palaiologina Kantakouzene

Michael Tih (Bulgarian: Михаил Тих, Mihail Tih) or probably more fully Michael Asen II was an emperor (tsar) of Bulgaria, the son of Emperor Constantine Asen I of Bulgaria and his second wife Maria Palaiologina Kantakouzene, niece of the Byzantine emperor Michael VIII Palaiologos, being the daughter of his elder sister Irene Palaiologina by John Kantakouzenos. Michael reigned as sole emperor from 1277 to 1278 (with co-rulers in 1272–1277 and 1278–1279), and claimed the throne again in 1302/3. As an ephemeral and underage monarch, Michael is often overlooked in listings of Bulgarian rulers.

== Life ==
Michael was born in c. 1270/1 (or, more broadly, between 1269 and 1272), and was perhaps named in honor of his great-uncle Michael VIII Palaiologos. He was also declared porphyrogennetos (porfirorodnij and bagrenorodnij in Bulgarian sources from 1272/3 and 1303) in accordance with Byzantine practice, perhaps to block any potential older sons of Constantine Asen I from inheriting the throne. Young Michael was crowned co-emperor by his parents before 1272 or 1273. His mother Maria was apparently working to ensure his unchallenged possession of the throne in the face of Constantine Asen's political and physical weakness. In this vein, she proceeded to adopt as son the adult despot Jacob Svetoslav, a semi-autonomous ruler and potential rival, and then to apparently have him poisoned in 1276.

Despite the co-option and subsequent elimination of the despot, Maria was unable to surmount the next challenge, the revolt of Ivailo in 1277. When Constantin Asen was killed in battle against Ivailo in 1277, young Michael was left as the legitimate emperor of Bulgaria, under the guidance of his mother Maria. Their control was quickly restricted to the capital Tărnovo. While much of the country fell into the hands of Ivailo, Maria's uncle Michael VIII put forth his own candidate for the Bulgarian throne, Ivan Asen III, a son of Mitso Asen and Maria of Bulgaria, whom the emperor married to his daughter Irene Palaiologina.

Invited by Michael VIII's envoys to surrender authority to Ivan Asen III, and with Byzantine armies marching north intent on placing him on the throne, Maria entered into secret negotiations with her husband's murderer Ivailo, offering to surrender the capital to him, if he would agree to marry her and guarantee her and her son's imperial positions. After a show of reluctance, Ivailo agreed to these terms for the sake of peace. He proceeded to marry Maria in the spring of 1278, becoming co-emperor with her son Michael. Ivailo was successful in resisting the Byzantine encroachments until he was blockaded by the forces of the Byzantine ally Nogai Khan of the Golden Horde inside Drăstăr (Silistra) for three months in 1278–1279, while another Byzantine force made its way to the capital Tărnovo. Already chafing under Ivailo's rule, and now presuming or pretending that he had died, the city nobles opened the gates of Tărnovo to the besieging Byzantine army and accepted Ivan Asen III as emperor in February 1279.

Michael was dethroned and, together with his mother Maria (who was pregnant by Ivailo), was surrendered to the Byzantines and sent into captivity in the Byzantine Empire, perhaps at Adrianople; the scene is related with glee by the Byzantine poet Manuel Philes, who describes the captive empress and her son as a lioness and her lion cub. Michael reappears on the pages of history only about 1302/3, when a faction of the Bulgarian nobility invited him to recover his throne from Theodore Svetoslav. Although provided with Byzantine military support, Michael proved unable to assert himself in Bulgaria, and is said to have "wandered about outside Tărnovo." This attempt to recover the Bulgarian throne is associated with a poorly preserved rock inscription from the cave monasteries by the village of Royak, naming "the porphyrogennetos emperor Michael." His subsequent fate and the date of his death are unknown.

Preceded by Constantine Asen I	Tsar of Bulgaria; 1272–1279; With: Constantine Asen I 1272–1277, with Ivailo 1278–1279	Succeeded by Ivan Asen III
