= Constantine I Tih =

Tsar of Bulgaria from 1257 to 1277

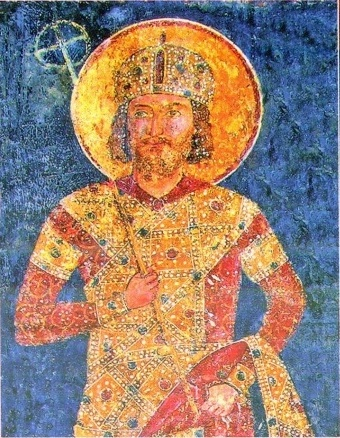
- Portrait of Konstantin Asen of the frescoes in the Boyana Church

Tsar of Bulgaria
- Reign: 1257–1277
- Predecessor: Mitso Asen
- Successor: Ivaylo
- Died: 1277
- Spouse: Unknown; Irene Doukaina Laskarina; Maria Palaiologina Kantakouzene
- Issue: Michael Tih
- House: Asen dynasty (nominally)
- Father: Tihomir (Tih)

Constantine I Tih Asen (Bulgarian: Константин I Тих Асен, romanized: Konstantin I Tih Asen) was the tsar of Bulgaria from 1257 to 1277, he was offered the throne from Mitso Asen. He led the Bulgarian Empire at a time when the nearby Byzantine Empire disintegrated into rump states. To strengthen his position, he forged an alliance with one of the rump states—Nicaea—by marrying Irene, a daughter of Theodore II of the prominent Laskaris family.

Early in his reign, his army invaded Severin, Hungary which outraged Béla IV; this led Hungarian troops to capture Vidin, an important town of the Bulgarian Empire and also saw the Hungarians besieging the Lower Danube region, leaving northwestern Bulgaria to Rostislav Mikhailovich (Béla's son-in-law), who had claimed Bulgaria in the years prior.

When Michael VIII took over the throne of the Byzantine Empire (which led Konstantin to go to war with them in the 1260s) this saw Bulgaria losing significant territories to its two principal enemies, the Byzantines and Hungary. Later, when Tatars began attacking the Byzantines, Konstantin joined them in a unified attack but this failed to capture Michael VIII.

After Stephen emerged victorious in the Hungarian civil war, he began attacking Bulgaria again and defeated Konstantin's army. He plundered Tarnovo and captured fortresses on the Danube in the mid to late 1260s. Later, Konstantin suffered an injury and was paralysed from the waist down. The paralysed Konstantin failed in preventing the Nogai Horde from plundering Bulgaria. Further worsening his situation, the latter part of his reign saw economic instability and his failed suppressing of a revolt ended his life.

== Early life ==
Konstantin Tih was a wealthy Bulgarian boyar (or nobleman) whose estates were located in the region of Sofia or Skopje. Konstantin stated in his charter to the Saint George Monastery near Skopje that Stefan Nemanja of Serbia was his grandfather. The Byzantine historian, George Pachymeres, described him as a "half-Serbian". He could have been related to the Serbian royal house through either his mother or father. If he was a patrilinear relative of Nemanja, his father, Tih, may have been the son of Nemanja's brother, Tihomir, according to historian Srdjan Pirivatrić. Pirivatrić and other scholars also say, Konstantin may have been a son or a nephew of the Bulgarian boyar John Tihomir, who controlled Skopje in the late 12th century. If Konstantin was related to the Serbian royal house through his mother, a daughter or a niece of Nemanja must have been his mother.

== Reign ==
=== Ascension ===
Konstantin Tih mounted the Bulgarian throne after the death of Michael II Asen, but the circumstances of his ascension are obscure. Michael Asen was murdered by his cousin, Kaliman in late 1256 or early 1257. Before long, Kaliman was also killed, and the male line of the Asen dynasty died out.

Rostislav Mikhailovich, Duke of Macsó (who was Michael and Kaliman's father-in-law), and the boyar Mitso (who was Michael's brother-in-law), laid claim to Bulgaria. Rostislav captured Vidin, Mitso held sway over southeastern Bulgaria, but none of them could secure the support of the boyars who controlled Tarnovo. The latter offered the throne to Konstantin who accepted the election.

Konstantin divorced his first wife (whose name is unknown), and married Irene Doukaina Laskarina in 1258. Irene was the daughter of Theodore II, Emperor of Nicaea, and Elena of Bulgaria, a daughter of Ivan Asen II of Bulgaria. The marriage with a descendant of the Bulgarian royal family strengthened his position. He was thereafter called Konstantin Asen. The marriage also forged an alliance between Bulgaria and Nicaea, which was confirmed one or two years later, when the Byzantine historian and official George Akropolites came to Tarnovo.

=== Conflict with Hungary ===
Rostislav Mikhailovich invaded Bulgaria with Hungarian assistance in 1259. In the following year, Rostislav left his duchy to join the campaign of his father-in-law, Béla IV of Hungary, against Bohemia. Taking advantage of Rostislav's absence, Konstantin broke into his realm and reoccupied Vidin. He also sent an army to attack the Banate of Severin, but the Hungarian commander, Lawrence, fought the invaders off.

The Bulgarian invasion of Severin outraged Béla IV. Soon after he concluded a peace treaty with Ottokar II of Bohemia in March 1261, Hungarian troops stormed into Bulgaria under the command of Béla IV's son and heir, Stephen. They captured Vidin and besieged Lom on the Lower Danube, but they were unable to bring Konstantin to a pitched battle, because he withdrew to Tarnovo. The Hungarian army left Bulgaria before the end of the year, but the campaign restored northwestern Bulgaria to Rostislav.

=== War with the Byzantine Empire ===
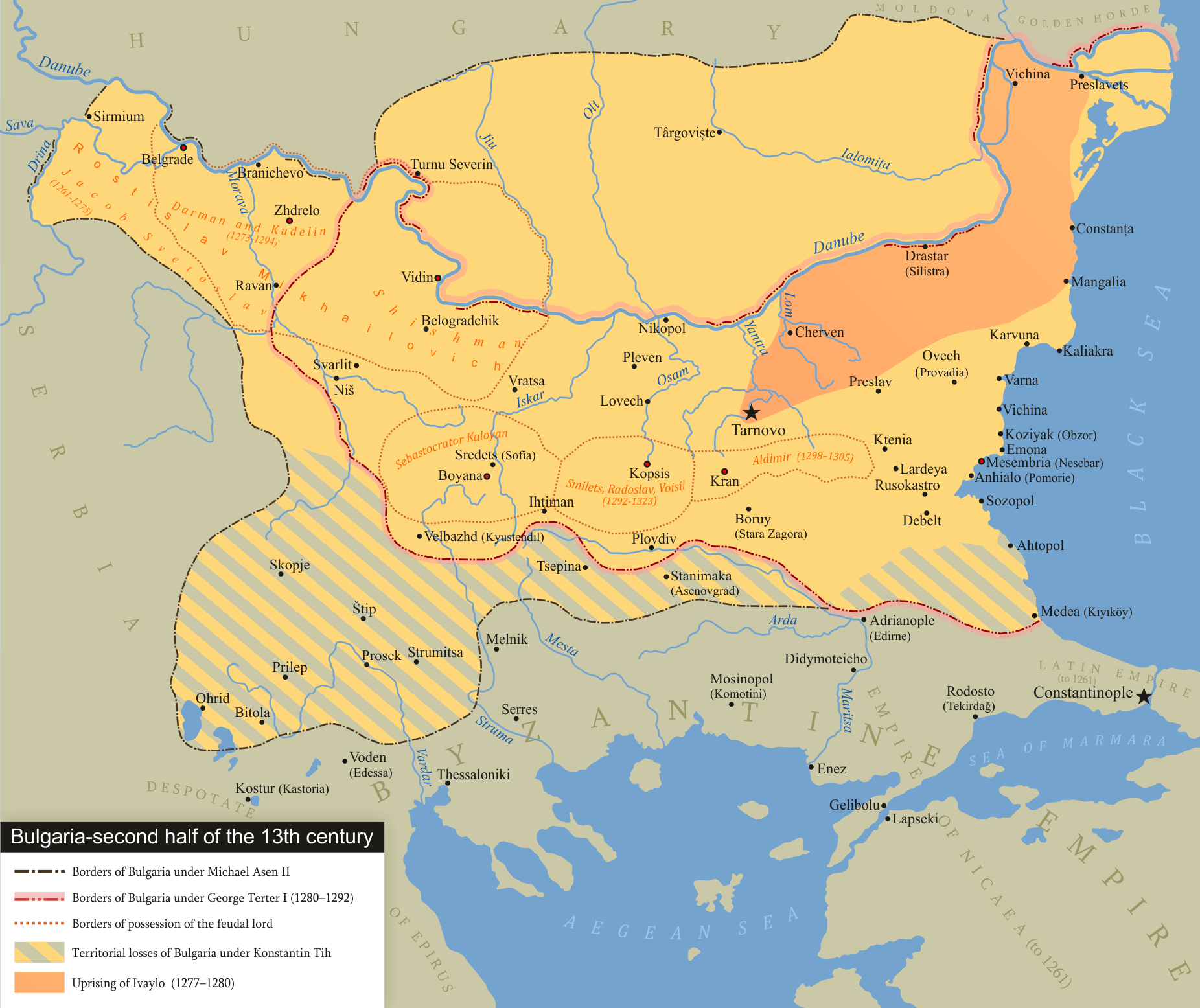
Bulgaria c.1260

Konstantin's minor brother-in-law, John IV Laskaris, was dethroned and blinded by his former guardian and co-ruler, Michael VIII Palaiologos, before the end of 1261. Michael VIII's army had occupied Constantinople already in July, thus the coup made him the sole ruler of the restored Byzantine Empire. The rebirth of the empire changed the traditional relations between the powers of the Balkan Peninsula. Furthermore, Konstantine's wife decided to take vengeance of her brother's mutilation and persuaded Konstantine to turn against Michael.

Mitso, who still held southeastern Bulgaria, made an alliance with the Byzantines, but another powerful nobleman, Jacob Svetoslav, who had taken control of the southwestern region, was loyal to Konstantine. Benefiting from a war between the Byzantine Empire, the Republic of Venice, Achaea and Epirus, Konstantine invaded Thrace and captured Stanimaka and Philippopolis (now Asenovgrad and Plovdiv in Bulgaria) in the autumn of 1262. Mitso was also forced to flee to Mesembria (now Nesebar in Bulgaria). After Konstantine laid siege to the town, Mitso sought assistance from the Byzantines, offering to surrender Mesembria to them in exchange for landed property in the Byzantine Empire. Michael VIII accepted the offer and sent Michael Glabas Tarchaneiotes to help Mitso in 1263.

A second Byzantine army stormed into Thrace and recaptured Stanimaka and Philippopolis. After seizing Mesembria from Mitso, Glabas Tarchaneiotes continued his campaign along the Black Sea and occupied Agathopolis, Sozopolis and Anchialos (now Ahtopol, Sozopol and Pomorie in Bulgaria). Meanwhile, the Byzantine fleet took control of Vicina and other ports at the Danube Delta. Glabas Tarchaneiotes attacked Jacob Svetoslav who could only resist with Hungarian assistance, thus he accepted Béla IV's suzerainty.

As a consequence of the war with the Byzantines, by the end of 1263, Bulgaria lost significant territories to its two principal enemies, the Byzantine Empire and Hungary. Konstantin could only seek assistance from the Tatars of the Golden Horde to put an end to his isolation. The Tatar khans had been the overlords of the Bulgarian monarchs for almost two decades, although their rule was only formal. A former Sultan of Rum, Kaykaus II, who had been imprisoned at Michael VIII's order, also wanted to regain his throne with the Tatars' help. One of his uncles was a prominent leader of the Golden Horde and he sent messages to him to persuade the Tatars to invade the Byzantine Empire with Bulgarian assistance. According to the Byzantine historian, Nicephorus Gregoras, Kaykaus also approached Konstantin, offering much money to him if he came to release him.

Thousands of Tatars crossed the frozen Lower Danube to invade the Byzantine Empire in late 1264. Konstantin soon joined them, although he had fallen from a horse and broken his leg. The united Tatar and Bulgarian armies launched a sudden attack against Michael VIII who was returning from Thessaly to Constantinople, but they could not capture the emperor. Konstantin laid siege the Byzantine fortress of Ainos (now Enez in Turkey), forcing the defenders to surrender. The Byzantines also agreed to release Kaykaus (who soon left for the Golden Horde), but his family was kept imprisoned even thereafter.

=== Disintegration ===
Konstantine's alliance with the Tatars strengthened his position. Jacob Svetoslav again accepted his suzerainty. Taking advantage of a civil war in Hungary, Jacob Svetoslav also invaded the Banate of Severin. The Hungarian civil war ended with the division of the country between Béla IV and Stephen in March 1266. Stephen launched a military campaign against Bulgaria and captured Vidin in June. Konstantin tried to resist, but the Hungarians defeated his army and plundered the region of Tarnovo. The Hungarians captured Pleven and other fortresses on the Danube and forced Jacob Svetoslav to again do homage to Stephen. Thereafter Jacob Svetoslav was styled as "emperor of Bulgaria" in the Hungarian royal charters.

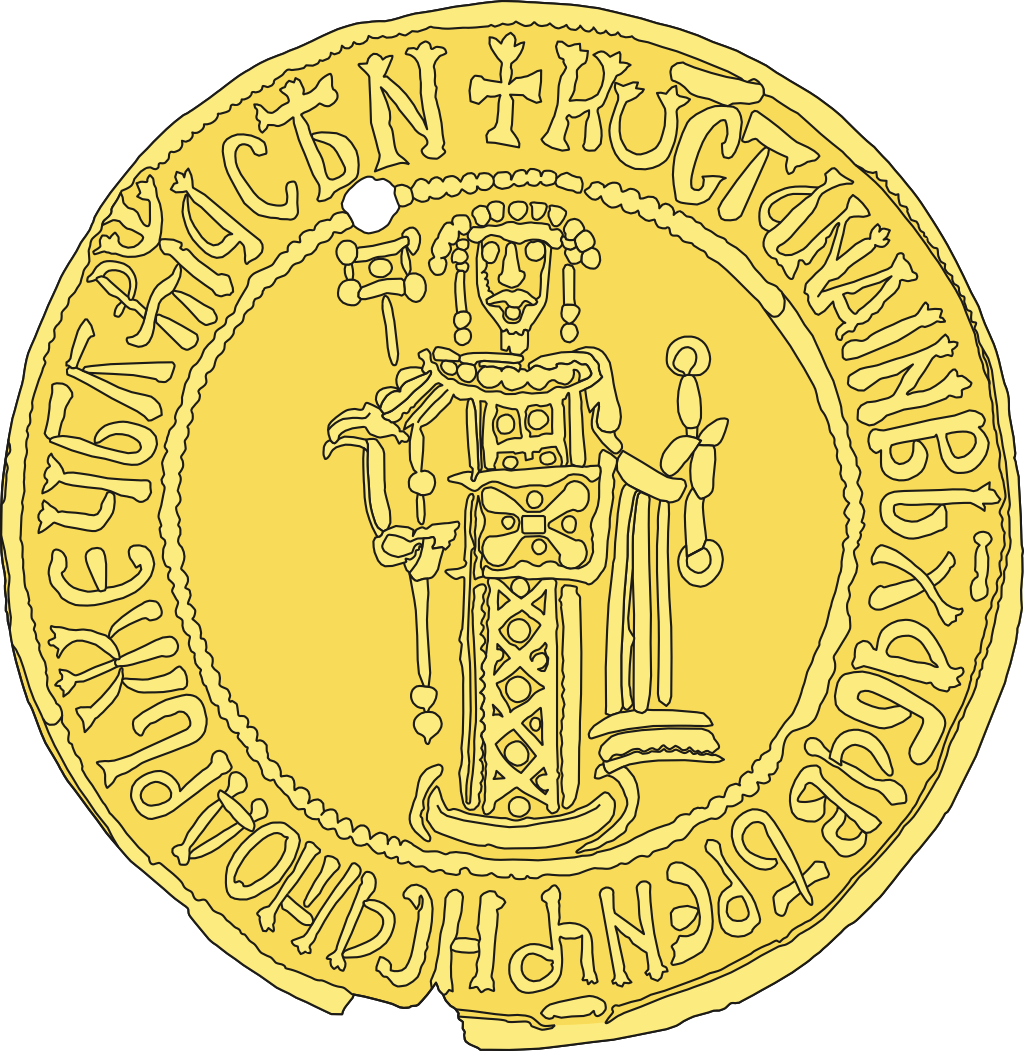
Golden seal of Konstantin Asen. Inscription in Bulgarian: "+Konstantin, in Christ the God, a faithful tsar and autocrat of the Bulgarians, Asen."

Charles I of Anjou and Baldwin II, the dispossessed Latin emperor of Constantinople, made an alliance against the Byzantine Empire in 1267. To prevent Bulgaria from joining the anti-Byzantine coalition, Michael VIII offered his niece, Maria Palaiologina Kantakouzene, to the widowed Konstantin in 1268. The emperor also pledged that he would return Mesembria and Anchialos to Bulgaria as her dowry if she gave birth to a son. Konstantin married Maria, but Michael VIII broke his promise and did not renounce the two towns after the birth of Konstantin and Maria's son, Michael. Outraged by the emperor's betrayal, Konstantin sent envoys to Charles to Naples in September 1271. The negotiations continued during the following years, showing that Konstantin was willing to support Charles against the Byzantines.

Konstantin broke into Thrace in 1271 or 1272, but Michael VIII persuaded Nogai, the dominant figure in the westernmost territory of the Golden Horde, to invade Bulgaria. The Tatars plundered the country, forcing Konstantin to return and abandon his claim to the two towns. Nogai set up his capital in Isaccea near the Danube Delta, thus he could easily attack Bulgaria.

Konstantin had been seriously injured after a riding accident and could not move without assistance, because he was paralyzed from the waist down. His ambitious wife took control of the government. After Michael VIII's envoys accepted Pope Gregory X's proposal to a church union at the Second Council of Lyon in summer 1274, she became one of the leading opponents of the union. She even tried to persuade Baibars, the Mamluk sultan of Egypt, to attack the Byzantine Empire. Maria was also determined to secure the throne to her son. Jacob Svetoslav, however, had a strong claim to succeed Konstantin, because his wife was a granddaughter of Ivan Asen II of Bulgaria. Maria first adopted Jacob Svetoslav to persuade him to acknowledge her son's right to the throne, but later she had him poisoned. He also had other noblemen captured or executed, which made Konstantin's rule unpopular.

The paralyzed Konstantin could not prevent Nogai's Tatars from making regular plundering raids against Bulgaria. The local inhabitants of the regions which were most exposed to the Tatar raids had to organize the defense without the monarch's support.

Due to the expensive and unsuccessful wars, repeated Mongol raids, and economic instability (Constantine was the first Bulgarian ruler to mint his own coins on a vast scale), the government was faced with a revolt in 1277. The social and economic aspects of this movement have been stressed by Marxist historians, but its true character is elusive. What is clear is that a swineherd or swine-owner named Ivaylo became a leader of the discontented and attracted many (presumably mostly lower-class) followers, asserting his control over a significant area. Konstantine set out against Ivaylo with his guard, but was decisively defeated and slain in his chariot.

== Family ==
Constantine I was married three times. The names of his first wife and children are unknown. By his second wife, Irene Doukaina Laskarina of Nicaea, Constantine had no children. By his third wife, Maria Palaiologina Kantakouzene, he had Michael Tih, who succeeded as co-emperor of Bulgaria 1277–1279.

== Sources ==
=== Primary sources ===
- George Akropolites: The History (Translated with and Introduction and Commentary by Ruth Macrides) (2007). Oxford University Press. ISBN 978-0-19-921067-1.

=== Secondary sources ===
- Андреев (Andreev), Йордан (Jordan); Лалков (Lalkov), Милчо (Milcho) (1996). Българските ханове и царе (The Bulgarian Khans and Tsars) (in Bulgarian). Велико Търново (Veliko Tarnovo): Абагар (Abagar). ISBN 954-427-216-X.
- Ангелов (Angelov), Димитър (Dimitar); Божилов (Bozhilov), Иван (Ivan); Ваклинов (Vaklinov), Станчо (Stancho); Гюзелев (Gyuzelev), Васил (Vasil); Куев (Kuev), Кую (kuyu); Петров (Petrov), Петър (Petar); Примов (Primov), Борислав (Borislav); Тъпкова (Tapkova), Василка (Vasilka); Цанокова (Tsankova), Геновева (Genoveva) (1981). История на България. Том II. Първа българска държава [History of Bulgaria. Volume II. First Bulgarian State] (in Bulgarian). и колектив. София (Sofia): Издателство на БАН (Bulgarian Academy of Sciences Press).
- Fine, John V. A. (1994). The Late Medieval Balkans: A Critical Survey from the Late Twelfth Century to the Ottoman Conquest. The University of Michigan Press. ISBN 0-472-08260-4.
- Андреевич Ильинский, Григорий (1911-02-04). Грамоты болгарскихъ царей [Letters of Bulgarian Emperors] (in Russian). Moscow: Синодальная типография.
- Madgearu, Alexandru (2017). The Asanids: The Political and Military History of the Second Bulgarian Empire, 1185–1280. BRILL. ISBN 978-9-004-32501-2.
- Nicol, Donald M. (1993). The Last Centuries of Byzantium, 1261–1453. Cambridge University Press. ISBN 0-521-43384-3.
- Pirivatrić, Srdjan (2011). "The Boyana Church Portraits: Contribution to the Prosopography of Sebastokrator Kaloyan". In Penkova, Bisserka (ed.). Боянската църква между Изтока и Запада в изкуството на християнска Европа [The Boyana Church between East and West in the Art of Christian Europe]. Нац. исторически музей. pp. 14–35. ISBN 978-954-91259-7-9.
- Treadgold, Warren (1997). A History of the Byzantine State and Society. Stanford University Press. ISBN 0-8047-2630-2.
- Vásáry, István (2005). Cumans and Tatars: Oriental Military in the Pre-Ottoman Balkans, 1185–1365. Cambridge University Press. ISBN 0-521-83756-1.

Preceded by Mitso Asen	Tsar of Bulgaria; 1257–1277	Succeeded by Ivaylo
