= Kotel Pass =

- Interactive map of Kotel Pass
- Elevation: 650 m (2,130 ft)
- Traversed by: Road 48

Location
- Location: Bulgaria
- Range: Balkan Mountains
- Coordinates: 42°55′3″N 26°27′2″E

Kotel Pass (Bulgarian: Котленски проход, lit. 'Pass of Kotel') is a mountain pass in the Balkan Mountains (Stara Planina) in Bulgaria. It connects the Kotel and Petolachka crossroads.

The pass is on one of the main routes connecting northern and southern Bulgaria.
