= Ivaylo of Bulgaria =

13th-century Bulgarian rebel leader

Ivaylo
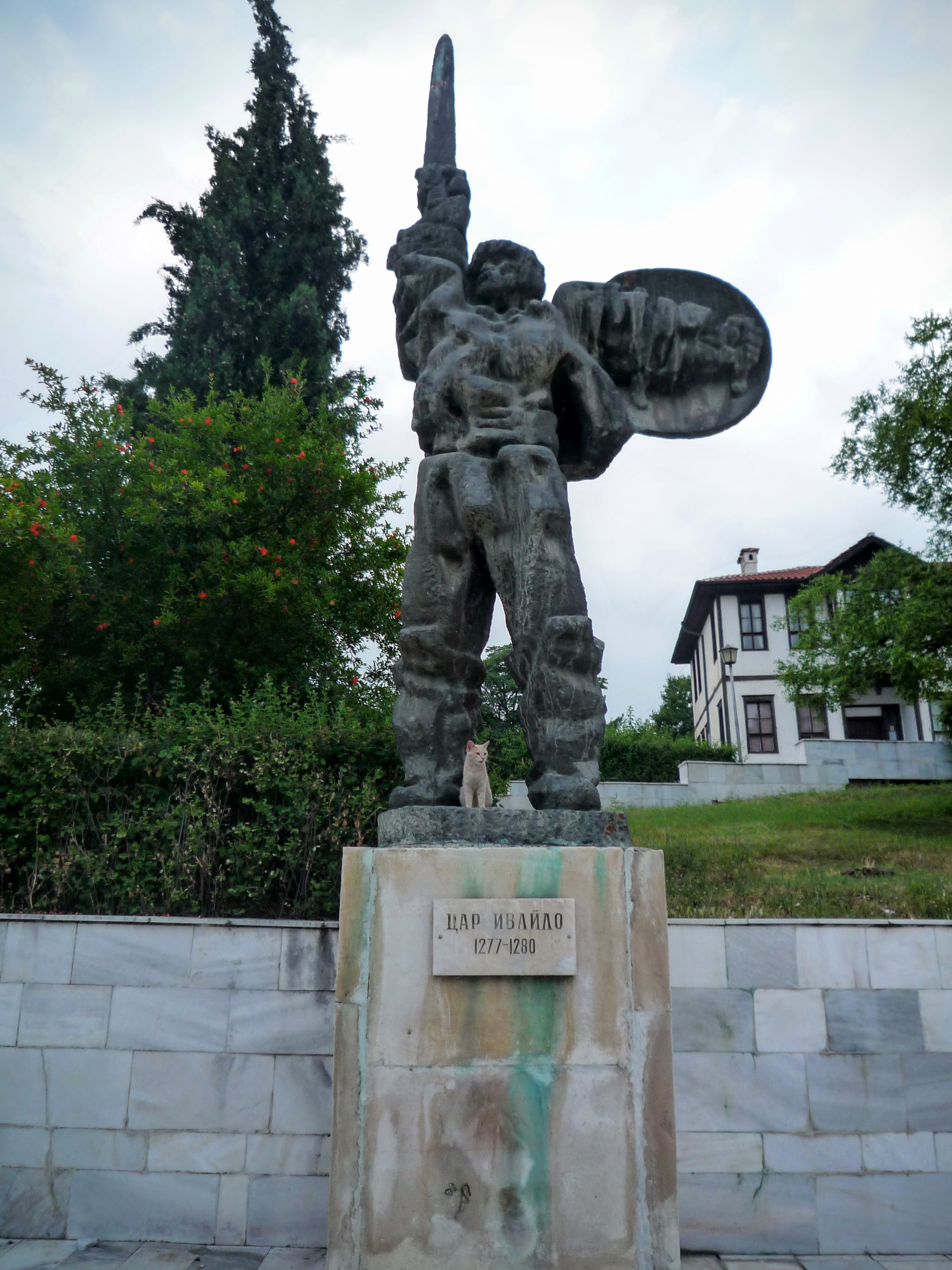
- Photo of a cat & a Statue of Ivaylo in Ivaylovgrad, Bulgaria

Tsar of Bulgaria
- Reign: 1278–1279
- Predecessor: Constantine Tikh Asen
- Successor: Ivan Asen III
- Died: 1281
- Spouse: Maria Palaiologina Kantakouzene

Ivaylo (died 1281), also spelled Ivailo (Bulgarian: Ивайло), or Ivail was a rebel leader who ruled briefly as tsar of Bulgaria. In 1277, he led a peasant uprising and forced the Bulgarian nobility to accept him as emperor. He reigned as emperor from 1278 to 1279, scoring victories against the Byzantines and the Mongols. Beset by foreign and domestic enemies, which included the Bulgarian nobles, he was eventually forced into exile among the Mongols, where he presented himself as a dethroned vassal. The Mongols then killed him in 1281 as an enemy of the Byzantine emperor Michael VIII Palaeologus.

Ivaylo's reign as a monarch has been used as an example of early anti-feudal class warfare by Marxist historians and has been translated through folk songs, traditions and legends. He served as an inspiration to Bulgarian guerrilla (hajduk) freedom fighters during the Ottoman period. He was nicknamed Bardokva ("radish" or "lettuce" in Bulgarian) and Lakhanas (Λαχανᾶς, "cabbage") in Greek.

== Etymology ==
According to historian Zhivko Voynikov, Cordocuba was a probable nickname of Ivaylo. He belonged to the lower strata, probably a small representative of the service aristocracy of Cuman origin, a free warrior with a small estate, engaged in cattle breeding. Byzantine sources describe him as some Cuman names and titles from the time of... 856 pig farmer, nicknamed Lakhana, because he ate (due to his poverty) cabbage "lakhana" (Bulg. dial. lakhana - λαχανον). Only George Pachymeres gives his name as Kordokuva/ Kordoku ba (Κορδόκουβας), which meant in Greek 'vegetable' or 'cabbage' (λάχανο) (GIBI 1980, 171–182).

The Russian Slavologist Sreznevsky claimed that Pachymeres had wrongly transmitted the Slavic word "bardokva", claiming a β ← κ transition. Burdokva means lettuce and was found as a Bulgarian dialect word in the 19th century (BER 2007, 101–102). The pan-Slavic reading of Bulgarian history by Russian scholars of the 19th - early 20th centuries, which is in the spirit of the era, should also be taken into account. The meaning of Κορδόκουβας as "cabbage" is seen in Kazakh, where we find the similar qыrыqqабат (кырыкбабат) - 'cabbage' (comes from qyrık - 40 and клапа - layer, i.e. a vegetable with many layers, with many leaves). As another possibility, not a literal, but a broader meaning of a given nickname, in Kyrgyz korduk - 'disgrace', korduktuu - 'insulted, humiliated' and üy - 'home' (Yudakhin 1985a, 406; Yudakhin 1985b, 319). In Old Turkic qor - 'damage, loss, damage' (DTS 1969, 457–458). In Kipchak öv – 'home' (Garkavets 2010, 1103–1104). Or of low origin, from the common people, from a non-noble family. T. Balkanski explains Cordocoba through Old Bulgarian. koroda - 'sword', which does not correspond to the sources. Another interesting reference to this name is the name of the Cumanite Korduk, mentioned in a Hungarian document from 1340. Rashoni connects it with a Turk. qur, qurtur - 'arrange, make' (Pilipchuk 2017, 266; DTS 1969, 469). But if some positive etymology is sought, it should rather be connected with Mongolian khurd - 'speed', khurdan, khurddah - 'quick, agile' (Kruchkin 2006, 863)

The current form "Ivaylo" is an accidental bastardization from K. Irechek's work. The only mention of this name is by Voisil the Grammarian, who left the following note: "I, the servant of God Constantin the Reader, called Voisil the Grammarian, wrote this book in the city of Sverlig in the days of King Ivail and under Bishop [of] Niš Nicodemus in the summer of 6787, indict 7 [=1279], when the Greeks were besieging the city of Tarnovo…”. The leaves from the manuscript were found in the village of Izvor, near the ruins of the medieval town of Sverlig. And this shows that Sverlig and the diocese of Niš at that time were part of Bulgaria. Forms of the name Ival, interestingly offer the Chuvash names Avlai, Evlei, and the name Avlai is also found among other Turkic nationalities. Ivlei is the Cuman name of the Ingul river. The name Ivlei and its variants Ivliy, Ivoil, Ivoilo are found among Russians and Ukrainians and are considered Turkic (Cuman) in origin. They are associated with Turk. ijivli - 'bent, hunched over', from Old Turkic. verb juv - 'to shrink, accumulate'. (relatives) But for the origin of the personal name one can also suggest Old Turkic javal, juvïl – 'calm, humble', but also 'generous, merciful', or javlaq – 'strong, healthy' . Prof. T. Balkanski believes that the name Ival, Ivail evolved into the Bulgarian linguistic environment quickly to the form Volo.

== Rise to power ==
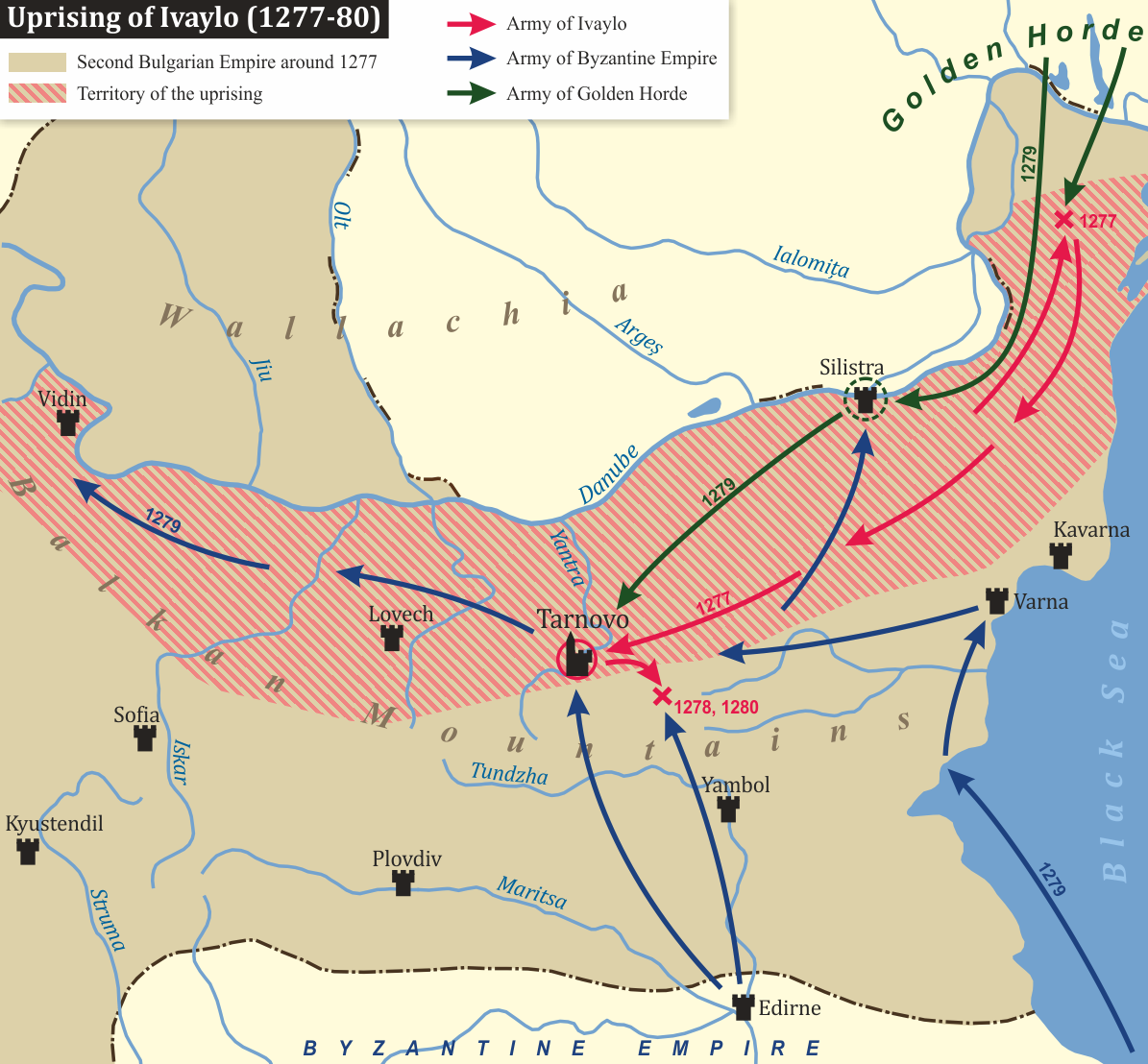
Uprising of Ivaylo

According to some sources, Ivaylo began his life living humbly and herded swine for payment. Other sources indicate he was a peasant farmer with no land of his own. He allegedly saw visions of himself grounded in the medieval Christian tradition, accomplishing great deeds and ridding Bulgaria of its troubles, including above all the frequent incursions by the Mongols of the Golden Horde under Nogai Khan. By 1277, Ivaylo had put his words into actions and had acquired leadership of an army composed of the militarized population on the Byzantine border and discontented peasants. He then went on to defeat several Mongol raiding parties, which made him even more popular among the population and even some nobles. Among his close associates and military commanders was Hranislav, who later entered Byzantine service after being captured. An attempt to subdue Ivaylo by the Bulgarian monarch Constantine I ended in utter failure, and Ivaylo is credited with killing the tsar in his chariot himself.

== Rule ==
Although Ivaylo was able to extend his authority across much of the country at the helm of his peasant army, he also met with resistance, and the capital Tarnovo remained under the control of the emperor Michael Asen II and his mother Maria Kantakouzena, which made him need to besiege it and conquer it militarily in 1279. Despite his victory against the Mongols in the north, Ivaylo pursued a more conciliatory vassal status when it came to policy-making with the Mongol khaganate.

Ivaylo's successes troubled the Byzantine Emperor Michael VIII Palaiologos, who at first decided to neutralize the potential danger by seeking an alliance with Ivaylo and to offer him his daughter as wife. Later Michael VIII changed his plan, married his eldest daughter Eirene to Ivan Asen III, a descendant of Bulgaria's ruling dynasty living at the Byzantine court, and dispatched troops to place him on the throne.

This caused an alliance between Ivaylo and Maria Kantakouzena, and Ivaylo married the widowed empress and was recognized as Bulgarian emperor in 1278, without deposing or disinheriting her minor son Michael Asen II. He led a successful defense of the Balkan passes against the Byzantine campaigns to assert Ivan Asen III. Ivaylo had met with success against casual Mongol raids, but a major Mongol army blockaded him in the fortress of Drastar (Silistra) on the Danube for three months in 1279. A rumor of Ivaylo's death caused panic in Tarnovo, where the nobility surrendered to a new Byzantine army and accepted Ivan Asen III as emperor. Ivan Asen III was enthroned, while Maria Kantakouzena and Michael Asen II were sent into exile in Byzantium.

Shortly after this, still in 1279, Ivaylo suddenly appeared before Tarnovo with an army, but failed to take the well-fortified city. He nevertheless defeated a larger Byzantine relief force in the Battle of Devina and another numbering 5,000 in the Balkan passes. Despairing of relief, Ivan Asen III fled Tarnovo in 1280, while his brother-in-law George Terter I seized the throne. The new ruler temporarily united the factious aristocracy, and Ivaylo gradually lost support. In 1280 or 1281, he traveled to the Mongol chieftain Nogai Khan, accepting his overlordship and seeking his support to recover his throne. Nogai was simultaneously approached by Ivaylo's rival Ivan Asen III, who was seeking his own restoration. Eventually Nogai had Ivaylo murdered, preferring the claim of Ivan Asen III, who was his brother-in-law (both Nogai and Ivan Asen III were married to daughters of Michael VIII of the Byzantine Empire).

== Family ==
By his marriage to Maria Kantakouzena, Ivaylo had one daughter, who is unnamed in the sources. She was not yet born in 1279, when her pregnant mother was captured by the Byzantines and exiled to Constantinople.

== Legacy ==
Ivaylo's rebellion has been hailed as the first great peasant revolt in European history by Marxist historians. Others might argue that while the troubled social conditions in the 1270s certainly contributed to the revolt, Ivaylo's rise to power may be more closely comparable to a nationalist reaction such as that led (albeit with religion as a strong inspiration) by Joan of Arc. Like other charismatic leaders, Ivaylo lived on in the popular imagination and there were pseudo-Ivaylos who appeared (mostly on Byzantine territory) in the late 13th century and early 14th century.

Ivaylo Cove on Snow Island in the South Shetland Islands, Antarctica, is named after Ivaylo. The city Ivaylovgrad is named after him.

== In popular culture ==
The real-time strategy video game Age of Empires II: Definitive Edition contains a five-chapter campaign titled "Ivaylo", starting with his uprising and murder of Constantine I, and concluding with Ivaylo's exile to the Mongols under Nogai Khan, where he eventually met his end.

== See also ==
- Uprising of Ivaylo

== Bibliography ==
- John V. A. Fine Jr., The Late Medieval Balkans, Ann Arbor, 1987.
- Jordan, Andrej (1999), History of the Second Bulgarian Kingdom - A Lecture Course, Veliko Tarnovo

Preceded by Constantine I and Michael Asen II	Tsar of Bulgaria; 1278–1279	Succeeded by Ivan Asen III
