= Keratsa =

Keratsa or Keraca (Bulgarian: Кераца) is a Bulgarian feminine given name. Notable people with the name include:

- Keratsa of Bulgaria (1348 – c. 1400), Bulgarian princess and Byzantine empress consort as the wife of Andronikos IV Palaiologos
- Keratsa Petritsa (fl. 1300–1337), Bulgarian noblewoman, wife of the sebastokrator Sratsimir
- Keratsa, daughter of Ivan Shishman of Bulgaria
- Keraca Visulčeva (1911–2004), Macedonian and Bulgarian artist
