= Ivan Shishman of Bulgaria =

Emperor of Bulgaria (c. 1350–1395)

Ivan Shishman of Bulgaria Иван Шишман
- Tsar of Bulgaria
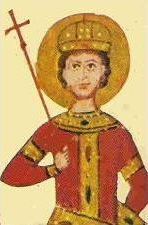
- Engraving of Ivan Shishman as a child from the Tetraevangelia of Ivan Alexander
- Reign: 17 February 1371 – 3 June 1395
- Predecessor: Ivan Alexander
- Successor: Ivan Sratsimir
- Born: 1350–1351
- Died: 3 June 1395; Nikopol, Bulgaria
- Spouse: Kira Maria; Dragana Lazarević
- Issue: see below
- House: Stratsimir
- Father: Ivan Alexander
- Mother: Sarah-Theodora

Ivan Shishman of Bulgaria (Bulgarian: Иван Шишман) (c. 1350–1395) ruled as emperor (tsar) of Bulgaria in Tarnovo from 1371 to 3 June 1395. The authority of Ivan Shishman was limited to the central parts of the Bulgarian Empire.

In the wake of the death of Ivan Alexander of Bulgaria, the Bulgarian Empire was subdivided into three kingdoms among his sons, with Ivan Shishman taking the Tarnovo Kingdom situated in central Bulgaria and his half brother Ivan Sratsimir of Bulgaria holding the Vidin Tsardom. Although his struggle to repel the Ottomans differentiated him from the other rulers on the Balkans like the Serbian despot Stephan Lazarevic who became a loyal vassal to the Ottomans and paid annual tribute and participated in all of the Ottoman campaigns subsequent to the battle of Kosovo, contributing a 5000 strong contingent of christian knights. Although Ivan Shishman has been categorized as indecisive and inconsistent in his policy in the past, this was done with little regard for an understanding of the context of the conditions and limited resources that this ruler had at his disposal. It is notable that Ivan Shishman is the only Balkan ruler for whom there is no evidence of tribute paid to the Ottoman Empire or any military aid provided. Based on historical evidence and the numerous folk songs of the region glorifying his struggle against the Ottoman invaders, the image of Ivan Shishman is one of fierce and concerted resistance to the Ottoman incursions.

Regardless, in 1393 the Ottoman Turks seized the capital Tarnovo. Two years later, Sultan Bayezid I captured Nicopolis with a surprise approach from the north of the fortress after two failed campaigns in Hungary and Wallachia, summoning Ivan Shishman on the false pretense of a discussion and had him executed by beheading.

Despite the military and political weakness, during his rule Bulgaria remained a major cultural center and the ideas of Hesychasm dominated the Bulgarian Orthodox Church. Patriarch Evtimiy of Tarnovo became the most prominent cultural figure of the country. A number of texts were written or translated and an orthographic reform of the Bulgarian language was issued with synchronised rules. After the fall of Bulgaria, a number of scholars found refuge in the other Orthodox countries and brought the achievements of the Bulgarian culture to them.

His reign was inextricably connected to the fall of Bulgaria under Ottoman domination. In Bulgarian folklore Ivan Shishman is portrayed as a legendary and heroic ruler who desperately fought against the overwhelming Ottoman forces. There are numerous sites, geographical features and fortresses named after him throughout Bulgaria.

== Biography ==
=== Early life ===
Born in 1350 or 1351, Ivan Shishman was the eldest son of emperor Ivan Alexander of Bulgaria (r. 1331–1371) and his second wife Sarah–Theodora, a Jewish convert to the Eastern Orthodox Church. His birth brought up the issue of the succession to the Bulgarian throne. Ivan Shishman had two elder brothers by the Ivan Alexander's first wife, Theodora of Wallachia. The eldest one, Michael Asen IV of Bulgaria, was proclaimed successor to the throne and co-emperor shortly after Ivan Alexander's accession to the throne. However, Michael Asen's early death in battle against the Ottomans in 1355 put forward the question of succession once more. It is likely that Sarah–Theodora pressured Ivan Alexander to select her own son as his successor, although Ivan Sratsimir of Bulgaria would have come next under the majorat system. The issue was decided in Ivan Shishman's favour because the latter was born in the purple (after his father was crowned), thus making him eligible as successor. By the end of 1355, Ivan Shishman had been proclaimed heir to the throne and co-emperor.

These events led to a conflict with Ivan Sratsimir, who was in turn given the rule of Vidin, probably as a compensation. Another indirect piece of evidence for the feud is the fact that Ivan Sratsimir's portrait not included in the Gospels of Tsar Ivan Alexander, where the whole family of the emperor was otherwise presented. In 1356 Ivan Sratsimir proclaimed himself emperor of Vidin. Together with his father and younger brother Ivan Asen V of Bulgaria, Ivan Shishman presided over the church synods at Tarnovo in the late 1360s.

=== Emperor of Bulgaria ===
==== Reign before 1388 ====
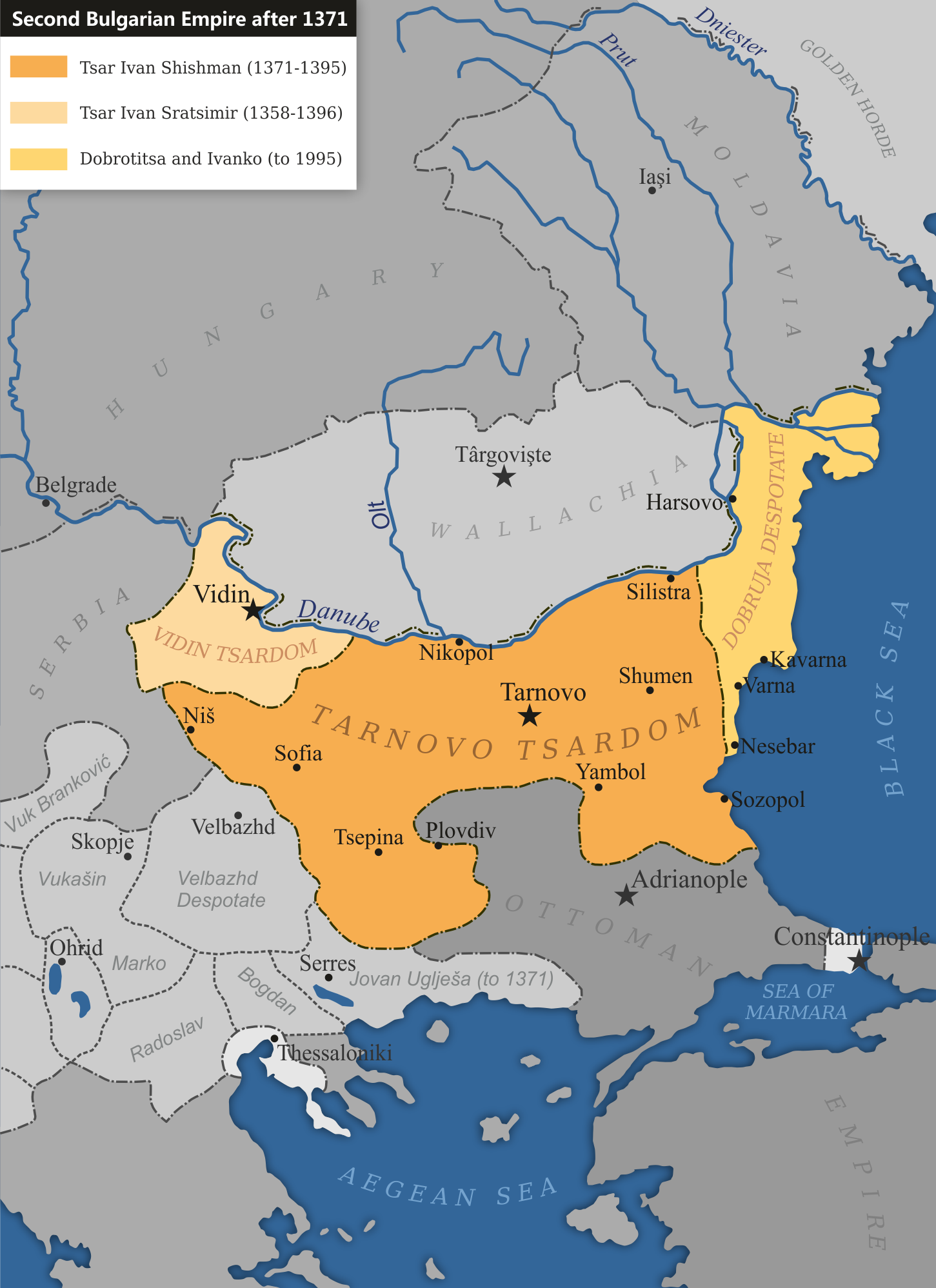
The Second Bulgarian Empire after the coronation of Ivan Shishman. His brother Ivan Sratsimir controlled Vidin to the north-west and despot Dobrotitsa controlled the coast to the east.

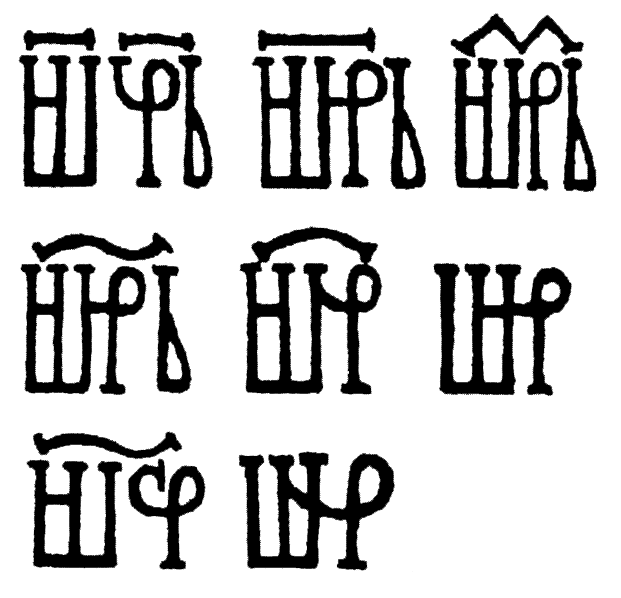
Monograms of Ivan Shishman

Ivan Shishman was proclaimed emperor after the death of his father on 17 February 1371, when he was in his early 20s. Ivan Shishman inherited only parts of his father's realm: he ruled the lands between the Iskar River and Silistra, the valley of Sofia, parts of the Rhodope Mountains and northern Thrace. To the west, the areas centred around Vidin recognised Ivan Sratsimir as emperor of Bulgaria, while to the east, the Principality of Karvuna, encompassing the coastal strip between the Danube Delta and Cape Emine and under the rule of despot Dobrotitsa, did not recognise the authority of the emperor of Tarnovo either. Contemporary chroniclers such as Johann Schiltberger speak of three regions, all of which were called Bulgaria. Thus, the country was divided on the eve of the Ottoman invasion, despite Ivan Shishman's claims in his royal charters. In these, he styled himself as a primary emperor in an attempt to emphasise the existence of a hierarchy among the rulers of the three Bulgarias. However, that hierarchy remained only in paper; to further assert their independence from Tarnovo, both Ivan Sratsimir and Dobrotitsa separated their dioceses from the Bulgarian Patriarchate in Tarnovo. According to Fine, immediately after the death of Ivan Alexander, Ivan Sratsimir tried to conquer the whole of Bulgaria. He was able to capture Sofia and managed to hold the city for one or two years. The rivalry between the two brothers for Sofia had a strong tradition in the Bulgarian historiography since the time of Konstantin Jireček, but it has been dismissed by many modern Bulgarian historians.

Only a few months after the ascension of Ivan Shishman to the throne, on 26 September 1371, the Ottoman Turks defeated a large Christian army led by the Serbian brothers Vukašin of Serbia and Uglješa Mrnjavčević in the Battle of Maritsa. Although Uglješa had tried to create a broad coalition that would include Bulgaria, Ivan Shishman, who had to strengthen his own authority, did not join. After their victory at Maritsa, the Turks immediately turned on Bulgaria. Ottoman sultan Murad I forced Ivan Shishman to retreat to the north of the Balkan Mountains and conquered northern Thrace, the Rhodopes, Kostenets, Ihtiman and Samokov. Unable to resist the attacks, Ivan Shishman had to negotiate with the Ottomans in 1373. He was forced to become an Ottoman vassal and to allow his sister Kera Tamara, who was known for her beauty, to become a wife of Murad I. Under this agreement, Bulgaria regained some of the conquered territories such as Ihtiman and Samokov and began nearly ten years of uneasy peace with the Turks. Despite the vassalage and the peace treaty, Ottoman raids were renewed in the beginning of the 1380s and culminated in 1385 with the fall of Sofia, the last stronghold of Ivan Shishman to the south of the Balkan Mountains.

In the meantime, Ivan Shishman was engaged in a war against the voivode of Wallachia, Dan I of Wallachia, between 1384 and 1386. There are few details about that war, only a brief note in the Anonymous Bulgarian Chronicle that Dan I died on 23 September 1386 after being poisoned. The war was linked to the hostilities between Ivan Shishman and Ivan Sratsimir (Dan I's uncle), who had the support of the Wallachian rulers and was married to Anna of Wallachia of the House of Basarab.

==== Fall of Bulgaria ====
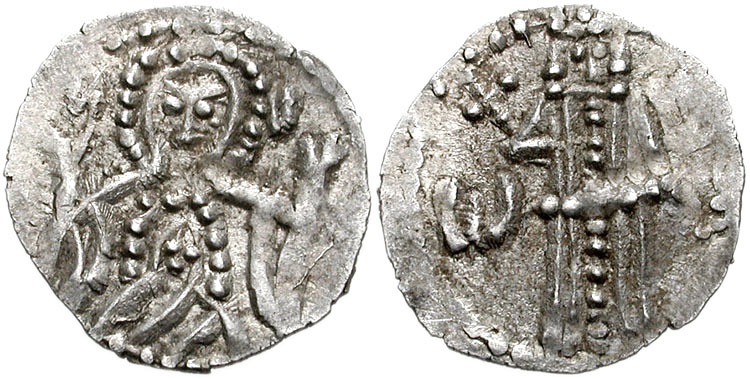
A silver coin of Ivan Shishman

In 1387, the united forces of the Principality of Serbia and the Kingdom of Bosnia managed to defeat the Ottomans in the Battle of Pločnik. Encouraged by the Christian success, Ivan Shishman immediately invalidated his vassalage to Murad I and refused to send troops in his support in 1388. The Ottomans reacted by sending a 30,000-strong army, under the command of the Grand Vizier Çandarlızade Ali Pasha, to the north of the Balkan Mountains. The Ottoman troops seized the fortresses of Shumen, Madara, Venchan and Ovech. Ivan Shishman left Tarnovo and headed to Nikopol, where he was besieged and forced to ask for peace. The Ottomans requested that he reconfirm his vassalage in addition to surrendering Silistra, at the time the most populous Bulgarian city along the Danube. However, Ivan Shishman, reassured by his neighbours that he would receive support and the preparations of Serbia for war, not only refused to let the Ottomans in the city but also strengthened its walls. Ali Pasha crossed the Balkan Mountains for a second time to consecutively capture Shumen, Cherven, Svishtov and once again besiege Ivan Shishman in Nikopol. Surprised by the swift Ottoman response and having not received the promised assistance, the Bulgarian emperor had to ask for peace. His pleas were accepted, but the terms were harsher than the original: not only Silistra was to be surrendered, but Ottoman garrisons were to be stationed in other Bulgarian cities, most notably Shumen and Ovech.

After the defeat of the Serbs and Bosniaks in the Battle of Kosovo on 15 June 1389, Ivan Shishman had to seek help from Hungary. During the winter of 1391–1392, he entered into secret negotiations with the King of Hungary Sigismund, Holy Roman Emperor, who was planning a campaign against the Turks. The new Ottoman sultan Bayezid I pretended to have peaceful intentions in order to cut off Ivan Shishman from his alliance with the Hungarians. However, in the spring of 1393 Bayezid gathered a large army from his dominions in the Balkans and Asia Minor and attacked Bulgaria. The Ottomans marched to the capital Tarnovo and besieged it. The defence of the capital was led by Patriarch Evtimiy of Tarnovo because Ivan Shishman was located in Nikopol, presumably for better communication with Sigismund. After a three-month siege, Tarnovo fell on 17 July. According to the contemporary Bulgarian scholar and cleric Gregory Tsamblak, the city was not captured because of the Ottoman military strength but due to treason. The Ottoman campaign of 1393 devastated Bulgaria; in the wake of that invasion, the lands of Ivan Shishman were limited to Nikopol and several towns along the Danube. Upon his return from Wallachia after the Battle of Rovine in 1395, Bayezid I attacked and captured Nikopol and, according to the Anonymous Bulgarian Chronicle, murdered Ivan Shishman on 3 June 1395. A Byzantine chronicle gives the date as 29 October. However, some sources suggest that the Bulgarian ruler was captured and died in prison.

=== Culture and religion ===
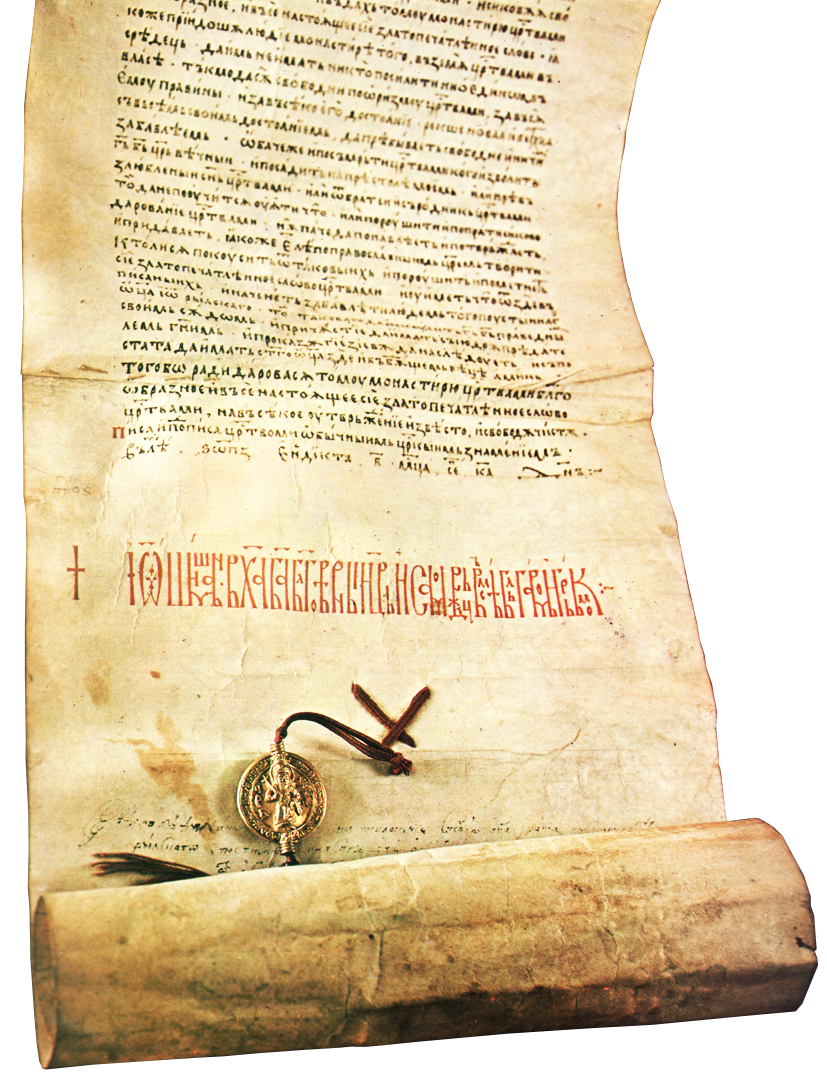
The Rila Charter of Ivan Shishman, issued in 1378 to grant privileges to the Rila Monastery. He was styled in the charter as "In Christ the Lord Faithful Emperor and Autocrat of all Bulgarians and Greeks.

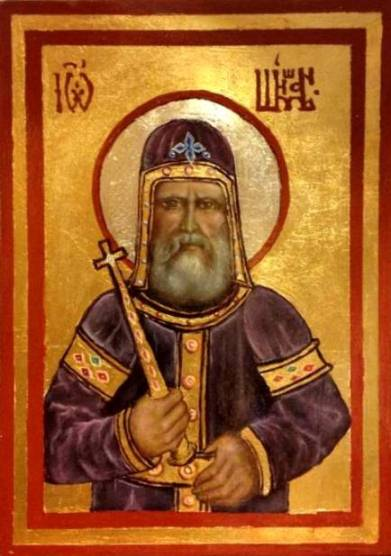
Icon of Saint Ivan Shishman

The cultural revival that made the historians call the reign of Ivan Alexander a "Second Golden Age of Bulgarian culture" continued under his son. The most prominent figure in that field during the last quarter of the 14th century was Patriarch Evtimiy of Tarnovo (r. 1375–1393), a disciple of Theodosius of Tarnovo. In 1371 he established the Monastery of the Holy Trinity, a few kilometres to the north of Tarnovo, and turned it into an important cultural center and a major hub of the Tarnovo Literary School. Evtimiy wrote a number of religious works, including hagiographies, praises and letters, but is most famous with the orthographic reform and the standardization of the Bulgarian language, which had an impact in Serbia, Wallachia and the Russian principalities. Evtimiy thought that many of the scholars were not sufficiently prepared, and that the translations of Greek texts in local dialects and peculiarities could lead to misinterpretation of the original and eventually to heretism. The texts regarding the reform did not survive, although its character has been partly recreated by the historians and linguists by analyzing the works of Evtimiy himself and his disciples. The orthography was inspired by the original Old Church Slavonic during the heyday of the First Bulgarian Empire; the reform also included syntax changes and enrichment of the lexicon with a number of synonyms to avoid repetition. To ensure the success of the reform, all texts had to receive approval before publishing, a move that was supported by Ivan Shishman in his edicts. The capital Tarnovo was the main cultural center at that time. Patriarch Evtimiy wrote about it:

Радва се днес славният град Търнов
и призовава царуващия над градовете, като казва:
Радвай се с мен, майко на градовете,
защото ония, които ти отгледа,
с тях се славя сега аз,
че ги придобих за помощници и застъпници.
Наистина блажен съм аз сред градовете,
защото добри съкровища събрах -
честитите мощи на светците,
чието застъпничество като притежавам,
от всякакви злини се избавям.

The glorious city of Tarnovo is rejoicing today
And invokes the reigning over the cities, saying:
Rejoice with me, mother of the cities,
Because with those that you raised,
I am lauding now,
For I acquired them for aides and advocates.
I am truly blissful among the cities,
Because I gathered good treasures –
The wonderful relics of the saints,
Whose advocacy when I have,
I get rid of all evil.

Hesychasm remained the main movement in the Bulgarian Orthodox Church during the reign of Ivan Shishman and the Patriarch was its supporter. Bulgaria was a major center of hesychast ideas along with the Byzantine Empire. Evtimiy was an active opponent to heresies, but it appears that since the mid-14th century the influence of the Bogomils, the most prominent heretic movement in the Balkans at the time, had been greatly reduced in Bulgaria and no document mentions them after 1360. Other sects, such as the Barlaamites, were also persecuted and repressed. Evtimiy had strict views on moral and took firm positions against divorce and third or fourth marriages for widowers and widows. After the collapse of the Bulgarian Empire, many scholars emigrated to Serbia, Wallachia, Moldavia and the Russian principalities; they brought Bulgarian cultural achievements, books, and hesychastic ideas to these lands. The Bulgarian influence was so great that is often referred to as a "Second South Slavic influence on Russia". Some of the most prominent Bulgarian émigrés included Constantine of Kostenets, who worked in Serbia, and Cyprian, Metropolitan of Kiev and Gregory Tsamblak in the Russian lands. The economy was in decline since the loss of the major ports of Messembria and Anchialus to the Savoyard crusade a few years before Ivan Shishman was crowned. After the death of Ivan Alexander and the breakaway of Dobrotitsa's Principality of Karvuna, Tarnovo also lost its most important port Varna, leading to a reduction in commerce and tax revenues. The persistent Ottoman raids brought devastation, hunger and depopulation which led to a sharp decline in the cultivated lands.

=== Assessment and legacy ===
Bulgarian historians have had mostly negative assessments of Ivan Shishman. He is often viewed as having intruded onto the throne due to the intrigues of his mother and thus taking the place of the rightful successor, his elder brother Ivan Sratsimir. This eventually resulted in the division of the country on the eve of the Ottoman invasion. There are no direct historical sources to suggest any significant attempts by Ivan Shishman to fight off the Turks. The inconsistent policy of Ivan Shishman has been described as revealing his weakness and inability to cope with the situation. His rule, however, was still remembered in the 16th century. In a treaty signed in 1519 between the Ottoman sultan Selim I and Louis II of Hungary, some of the lands in question were referred to as terra cesaris Sysman, "the land of emperor Shishman".

Tsar Ivan Shishman is a character in the English Renaissance tragedy “The Courageous Turk or Amurath the First” by Thomas Goffe.

The memory of Ivan Shishman remained during the first centuries of the Ottoman rule. During the First Tarnovo uprising in 1598, one of the rebels' leaders, whose name is unknown, claimed to have been a descendant of Ivan Shishman and was proclaimed emperor under the name Shishman III. Almost a century later, in 1686, a second uprising in Tarnovo was headed by Rostislav Stratimirovic, who also claimed to have belonged to the Shishman dynasty and styled himself as Prince of Bulgaria.

Ivan Shishman is now among the most popular and well-known rulers in the Third Bulgarian State. There are a number of works dedicated to him or his rule, including the 1969 film Tsar Ivan Shishman by Yuri Arnaudov and the song "Tsar Ivan Shishman" by the heavy metal band Epizod in the 2004 album "Saint Patriarch Evtimiy". Shishman Peak on Livingston Island in the South Shetland Islands, Antarctica is also named after him.

== Legends ==
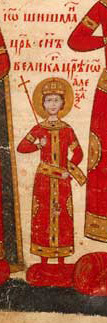
A miniature of the juvenile Ivan Shishman from the Tetraevangelia of Ivan Alexander.

Ivan Shishman is the most prominent medieval ruler in Bulgarian folklore. His name is heard in a number of legends, myths, tales and songs. He is represented as a heroic ruler who fought and died for his country, facing overwhelming enemy forces. There are a number of places throughout Bulgaria named after him, ranging from castles and ruins to rocks, caves and localities. That legendary "geography" is mainly concentrated in the region of Sofia, Ihtiman and Samokov, though it extends to the Rhodope Mountains, Sredna Gora, Vratsa, Pleven, Prilep, Varna, etc. Near Samokov are the ruins of "Shishman's Fortress" with the emperor's wells, which reputedly spouted from the ruler's seven wounds. Further north, along the cliffs and heights of the Iskar Gorge, are "Shishman's Holes", the caves where he hid while fighting the Ottomans for seven years. Other related toponyms usually associated with the emperor's last stand are Kokalyane (derived from kokal, meaning "bone"), Cherepish (from cherep, "skull") and Lyutibrod ("Fierce Ford"), all thought to be hinting at the fate of the perished Bulgarian troops.

One of the most famous legends is about Shishman's final battle. The Ottomans camped at Kostenets, near the origins of the Maritsa river, while the Bulgarians were near Samokov, on a hill. After a fierce battle, Ivan Shishman was wounded seven times and retreated to the fortress, where he died; on the battlefield seven springs appeared, one for each of the emperor's wounds. He is also said to have fought in the Balkan Mountains at Shishkin grad ("Shishman's town"), between Sliven and Kazanlak, where he killed 10,000 janissaries in a huge battle. The 18th century Bulgarian enlightener Paisius of Hilendar wrote in his Istoriya Slavyanobolgarskaya that during the siege of Tarnovo Ivan Shishman managed to reach Sofia with his boyars. He hid his treasury in the Iskar gorge and fought against the Turks for seven years before dying in battle. Some versions suggest that Kokalyanski Urvich remained the last fortress to fall and before Shishman died he buried treasure under the castle and tried to escape by cutting a passage through the mountain. The repeating motif of the treasure is a sacral symbol of the Bulgarian statehood and the usual locations of the imperial jewellery are monasteries, lakes or hideouts under rivers. Being undiscovered by the invaders, the treasure symbolises the sovereignty and power of the Bulgarian Empire and its inevitable resurrection. There are also a number of parallels between the legends about Ivan Shishman and the hagiography of saints, especially John of Rila, including the almost identical route of the emperor, Tarnovo-Sofia-Samokov in Rila, and the route of the return of the relics of Saint John of Rila to the Rila Monastery in 15th century – Tarnovo-Sofia-Rila, and also the motif of the immortal rulers who foresees the restoration of the country.

Откак се е, мила моя майко ле, зора зазорила,
Оттогаз е, мила моя майко ле, войска провървяла,
Кон до коня, мила моя майко ле, юнак до юнака,
Сабите им, мила моя майко ле, както ясно слънце,
Огън светка, мила моя майко ле, през гора зелена,
Войвода им, мила моя майко ле, сам цар Иван Шишман,
Отговаря, мила моя майко ле, сам цар Иван Шишман:
Боже силни, мила моя майко ле, боже създателю,
Помогни ни, мила моя майко ле, сила и юначество!
Бой щем да се бием, мила моя майко ле, на софийско поле,
Кръв ще леем, мила моя майко ле, за Христово име,
Ще прославим, мила моя майко ле, християнска вяра.

Since when has, my dear mother, dawn raised,
Since then has, my dear mother, an army marched,
Horse to horse, my dear mother, champion to champion,
Their sabres, my dear mother, as clear sun,
Fire is shining, my dear mother, through green forest,
Their leader, my dear mother, Tsar Ivan Shishman himself,
Responds, my dear mother, Tsar Ivan Shishman himself:
Allmighty God, my dear mother, creator God,
Help us, my dear mother, with strength and courage!
We are going to fight a battle, my dear mother, on the valley of Sofia,
We are going to spill blood, my dear mother, in the name of Christ,
We are going to praise, my dear mother, the Christian faith.

Extract of a folklore song, collected by the Miladinov Brothers.

Ivan Shishman is one of the few rulers to be mentioned in the Bulgarian folklore songs and, as in the legends, is a subject of mystification. His figure can even be seen in Christmas carols, where he is presented either as a saint in the role of protector or as a hero fighting dragons and oppressors, usually presented as Tatars because of the resemblance with the Tartarus. The songs about Ivan Shishman contain many parallels with nature and collocations which are typical of Bulgarian folklore. In a song from the region of Sliven, the death of the emperor brings chaos to nature and rivers of "black blood" (typical folklore collocation) start flowing.

The place of Ivan Shishman in the Bulgarian legends and folklore is most likely attributed to the fact that he was the last Bulgarian emperor in Tarnovo. There are many similarities with his contemporary King Marko, the ruler of Prilep, who did little to resist the Ottoman invasion but later became the most popular character in the Bulgarian folklore. The people desired to berhyme the image of the "ideal emperor", a defender and protector, whose strength they needed to survive under Ottoman domination, and not the actual historical personality. As time passed the mystification deepened and the legends became more distant from the actual events during his rule. During the Bulgarian National Revival the tales about Ivan Shishman began to increasingly include patriotic elements.

== Family ==
Ivan Shishman was married first to a Bulgarian named Kira Maria, who died in the early 1380s. His second wife was Dragana Lazarević, a daughter of Prince Lazar of Serbia and Princess Milica of Serbia and kin to the previous Serbian dynasty. His eldest son Alexander converted to Islam under the name Iskender, and died as governor of Smyrna in 1418, while his second son Fruzhin participated in revolts and campaigns against the Ottomans, trying to liberate his father's realm, and died in Hungary after 1444. It has been speculated by historians, such as Plamen Pavlov, that Patriarch Joseph II of Constantinople was an illegitimate son of Ivan Shishman. The claim is based on a Byzantine text which says "They said that he [Joseph II] was an illegitimate son of the emperor Shishman".

Family tree of the Shishman Dynasty

Shishman married to Unknown
Michael Shishman (r. 1323–1330) married to 1. Anna Neda 2. Theodora Palaiologina	Belaur	Keratsa Petritsa, married to despot Sratsimir
1. Ivan Stephen; (r. 1330–1331)	1. Shishman	1. Michael, married to unknown	1. Ludovik	2. Unknown
Ivan Alexander (r. 1331–1371) married to 1. Theodora Besarab 2. Sarah-Theodora	John Komnenos Asen married to 1. Unknown 2. Anna Palaiologina	Michael married to unknown	Helena married to Stefan Dushan (r. 1331–1355)	Theodora
Alexander Komnenos Asen, Xenia Ivanina Komnena	Shishman
1. Michael IV Asen married to Irina Palaiologina	1. Ivan Sratsimir; (r. 1356–1396) married to Anna	1. Ivan Asen IV	1. Kera Tamara married to Constantine Murad I (r. 1362–1389)	2. Keratsa-Maria married to Andronikos IV Palaiologos (r. 1376–1379)	2. Ivan Shishman; (r. 1371–1395) married to 1. Kira Maria 2. Dragana	2. Ivan Asen V	2. Desislava	2. Vasilisa
Constantine II (r. 1397–1422)	Dorothea married to Tvrtko I (r. 1353–1391)	Unknown daughter	John VII Palaiologos (r. 1390)	2 unknown daughters	Alexander	Fruzhin married to unknown	Keratsa	4 unknown; Patriarch Joseph II possible illegitimate son
Shishman	2 unknown

== Timeline ==
- 1350 or 1351 – Ivan Shishman was born
- By 1355 – Proclaimed heir to the throne and co-emperor
- 17 February 1371 – Succeeds his father as Emperor of Bulgaria in Tarnovo
- 1371 – Battle of Samokov
- 1371 or 1372 – Battle of Sofia valley
- 1373 – Becomes Ottoman vassal in return for some previously conquered lands
- 1378 – Issues the Rila Charte
- 1380 – First siege of Sofia
- 1382 – Second siege and fall of Sofia
- 1384 to 1386 – Successful war against Wallachia
- 1388 – The Ottomans invade eastern Bulgaria and conquer a number of towns
- Recapture of Shumen by Shishman in 1392
- 17 July 1393 – Fall of Tarnovo
- 3 June 1395 – The Ottomans capture Nikopol and Ivan Shishman is executed

== Footnotes ==
=== Notes ===
a: The exact year of the fall of Sofia is uncertain. Some modern historians suggest 1382 while others – 1385.
b: The numbers designate which wife each child was born to.
c: The people who participated in the Bulgarian National Revival during the Ottoman rule were called enlighteners.

== Sources ==
=== References ===
- Андреев, Йордан (Jordan Andreev); Лалков, Милчо (Milcho Lalkov) (1996). Българските ханове и царе [The Bulgarian Khans and Tsars] (in Bulgarian). Велико Търново (Veliko Tarnovo): Абагар (Abagar). ISBN 954-427-216-X.
- Bogdan, Ioan (1966). Contribuţii la istoriografia bulgară şi sârbă în Scrieri alese [Contributions from the Bulgarian and Serbian Historiography in Selected Writings] (in Romanian). Bucharest: Anubis.
- Божилов, Иван (Ivan Bozhilov); Гюзелев, Васил (Vasil Gyuzelev) (1999). История на средновековна България VII-XIV век (History of Medieval Bulgaria 7th–14th Centuries) (in Bulgarian). София (Sofia): Анубис (Anubis). ISBN 954-426-204-0.
- Делев, Петър (Petar Delev); et al. (1996). "19. България при цар Иван Александър (Bulgaria under Emperor Ivan Alexander)". История и цивилизация за 11 клас [History and Civilization for 11th Grade] (in Bulgarian). Труд, Сирма (Trud, Sirma). ISBN 954-439-701-9.
- Fine, J. (1987). The Late Medieval Balkans, A Critical Survey from the Late Twelfth Century to the Ottoman Conquest. The University of Michigan Press. ISBN 0-472-10079-3.
- Георгиева, Цветана (Tsvetana Georgieva); Генчев, Николай (Nikolay Genchev) (1999). История на България XV-XIX век (History of Bulgaria 15th-19th Centuries) (in Bulgarian). София (Sofia): Анубис (Anubis). ISBN 954-426-205-9.
- Андреевич Ильинский, Григорий (4 February 1911). Грамоты болгарскихъ царей [Letters of Bulgarian Emperors] (in Russian). Moscow: Синодальная типография.
- Kazhdan, A.; et al. (1991). "Volume I". The Oxford Dictionary of Byzantium. New York City, Oxford: Oxford University Press. ISBN 0-19-504652-8.
- Иречек, Константин (Konstantin Jireček) (1978). "XXIII Завладяване на България от турците (Conquest of Bulgaria by the Turks)". In Петър Петров (Petar Petrov) (ed.). История на българите с поправки и добавки от самия автор (History of the Bulgarians with corrections and additions by the author) (in Bulgarian). София (Sofia): Издателство Наука и изкуство.
- Златарски, Васил (Vasil Zlatarski) (2005). България през XIV-XV век (Bulgaria during the 14th and 15th Centuries) (in Bulgarian). Изток–Запад (Anubis). ISBN 954-321-172-8.

Emperor of Bulgaria
Preceded by Ivan Alexander	Emperor of Bulgaria; 1371 – 1395	Succeeded by Ivan Sratsimir
