= Sarah-Theodora =

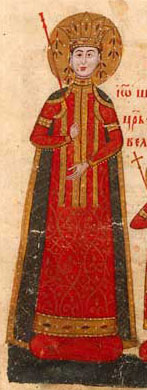
- Manuscript miniature of Sarah-Theodora (Tetraevangelia of Ivan Alexander).

Empress consort of Bulgaria
- Tenure: 1349–1371
- Born: Unknown
- Died: Unknown; Bulgaria
- Spouse: Ivan Alexander of Bulgaria
- Issue: Kera Tamara; Kera-Maria; Ivan Shishman; Ivan Asen; Desislava of Bulgaria; Vasilisa of Bulgaria
- Dynasty: Shishman
- Religion: Eastern Orthodox prev. Judaism

Sarah, Theodora or Sarah-Theodora was an Empress of Bulgaria during the Second Bulgarian Empire and second wife of Tsar Ivan Alexander of Bulgaria (ruled 1331–1371).

== Biography ==
Sarah-Theodora is believed to have been of Jewish descent, having lived with her family in the Jewish neighbourhood in Tarnovo. Ivan Alexander divorced his wife of many years, Theodora of Wallachia, who was forced to become a nun, and Sarah converted to Eastern Orthodox Christianity, accepted the name Theodora and soon became the Tsar’s second consort. Their marriage took place in the late 1340s.

The new Tsaritsa was renowned for her fierce support of her adopted Eastern Orthodox faith. She was one of the instigators of a church council against the Jews, oversaw the restoration of many churches and the construction of new monasteries, for this she is held in high regard by the Bulgarian Church.

There is no doubt that Theodora played a significant role in the separation of the Bulgarian Empire between her firstborn, Ivan Shishman, and Ivan Sratsimir, the sole surviving son of the former Tsaritsa. Since Ivan Shishman was the first son born to Ivan Alexander after his accession to the throne ("born in the purple"), Theodora insisted that he was the only one worthy of the crown. Ivan Shishman was crowned co-emperor by his father who made his elder son Despot of Vidin in exchange. After Ivan Alexander died in 1371, Ivan Shishman became Tsar and Ivan Sratsimir declared Vidin a separate empire. From now on, the relationship between the two Bulgarian Empires became cold and remained so despite the threat of the forthcoming Ottoman invasion.

The date of the death of the Tsaritsa is unknown, although some historians assume she died in the late 1380s.

== Family ==
There are six known children born to Tsar Ivan Alexander and Tsaritsa Theodora:

- Kera Tamara
- Kera-Maria
- Ivan Shishman
- Ivan Asen
- Desislava of Bulgaria
- Vasilisa

== Honours ==
Mount Sara Teodora on Oscar II Coast in Graham Land, Antarctica is named after Sarah-Theodora.

== Sources ==
| Preceded by Theodora of Wallachia | Empress consort of Bulgaria; 1349–1371 | Succeeded by Kira Maria |
