= Fruzhin =

Prince of Bulgaria (died c. 1460)

Tsar Fruzhin
- Prince of Bulgaria
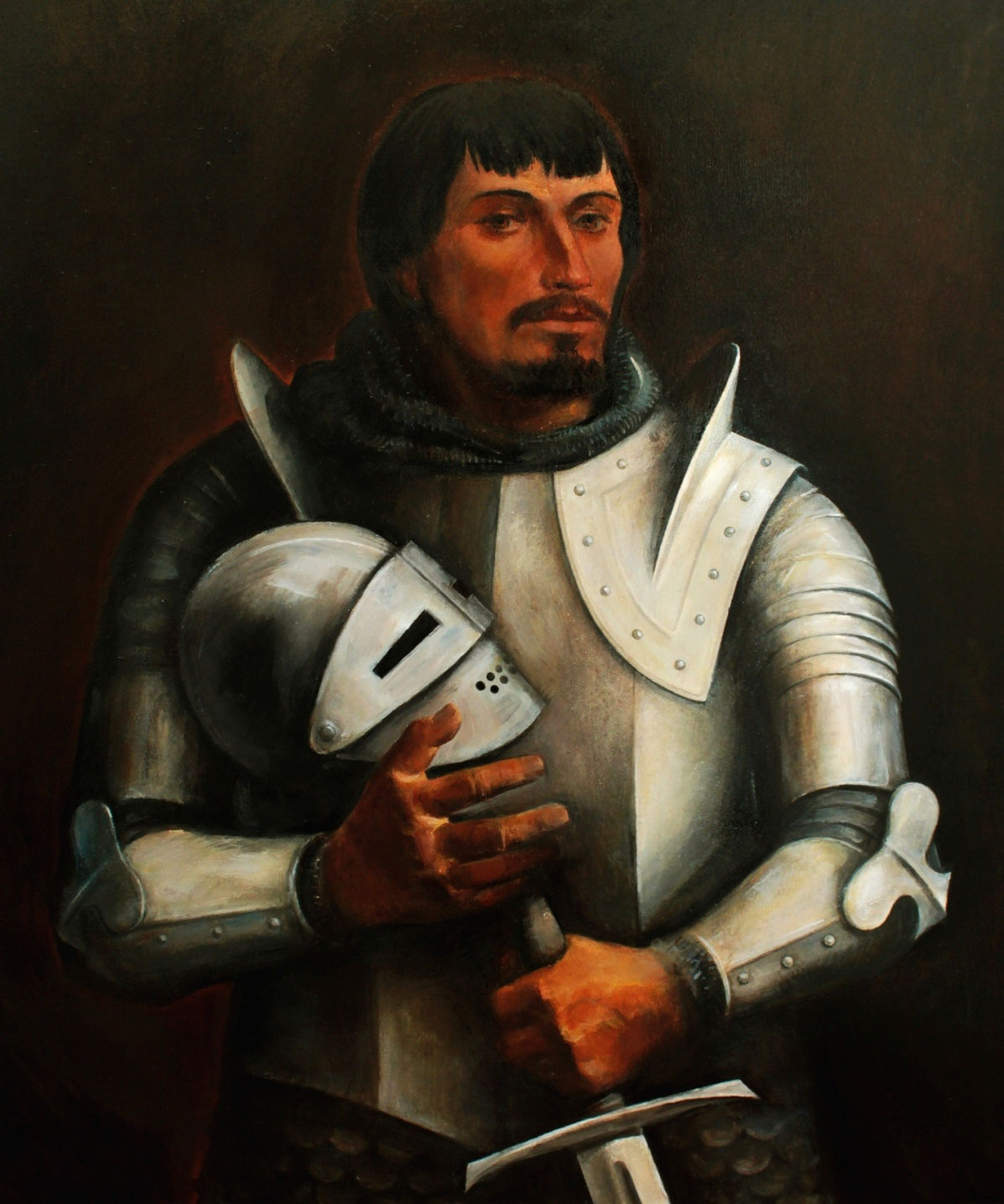

Tsar of Bulgaria (titular)
- Reign: 1422–1460
- Predecessor: Constantine II
- Successor: None (eventually Alexander I)
- Born: Tarnovo, Tsardom of Bulgaria
- Died: c. 1460; Brașov, Kingdom of Hungary
- House: Sratsimir
- Father: Shishman of Bulgaria
- Mother: Dragana of Serbia

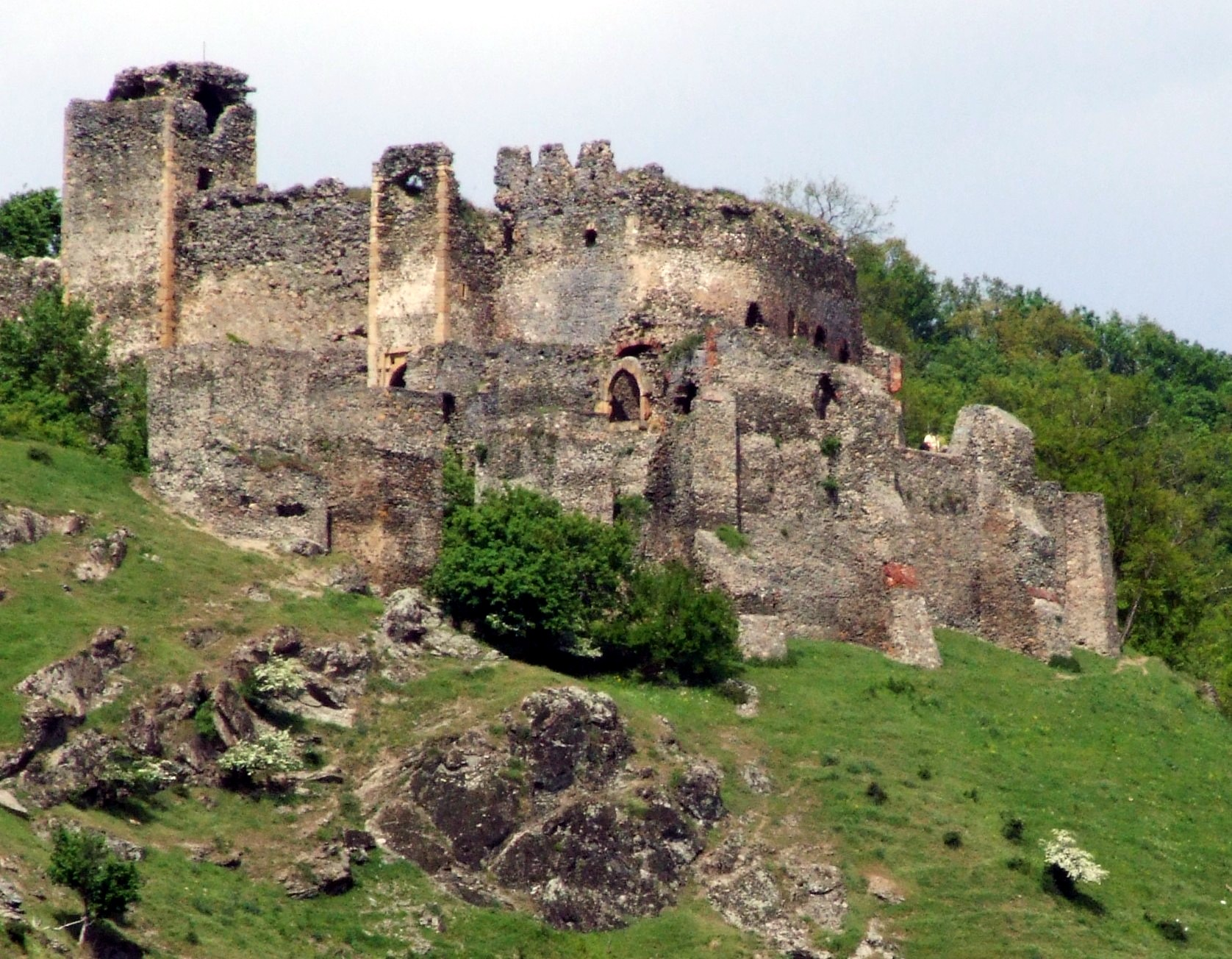
The Şoimoş castle near modern Lipova, likely the seat of Fruzhin's Hungarian domains

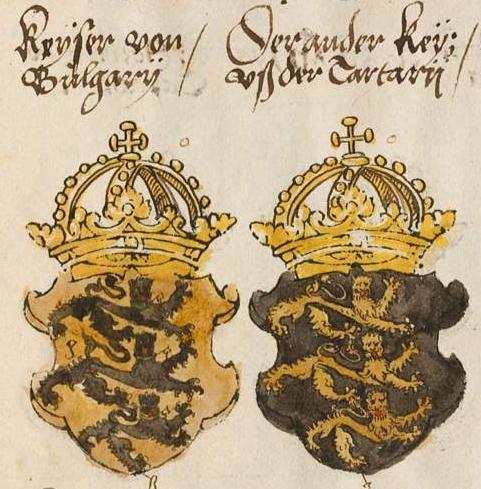
coat of arms on last bulgarian rulers Fruzhin and Konstantin II Asen in Bayerische Staatsbibliothek, München

Fruzhin (Bulgarian: Фружин; also transliterated Fružin or Frujin; died c. 1460) was a 15th-century Bulgarian noble who fought actively against the Ottoman conquest of the Second Bulgarian Empire. A son of one of the last Bulgarian tsars, Ivan Shishman of the Tarnovo Tsardom, Fruzhin co-organized the so-called Uprising of Konstantin and Fruzhin along with Constantine II of Vidin, the last medieval Bulgarian monarch. Fruzhin was mainly based in the Kingdom of Hungary, where he was the ruler of Temes County.

== Biography ==
Neither Fruzhin's birthdate nor his biography prior to the Fall of Tarnovo to the Ottomans in 1393 are known, but from his involvement in the 1404 uprising, the former can be narrowed down to the 1380s, the same decade his parents married, and there is no mention of him having been a bastard. He had a brother, Alexander, who converted to Islam after the Ottoman conquest, adopting the name Iskender and becoming governor of Samsun and then Smyrna, where he died in 1418. As the capital Tarnovo was captured by the Ottomans, Fruzhin fled initially to the domains of his uncle Ivan Sratsimir at Vidin, in the Bulgarian northwest. He settled in Hungary under Sigismund I some time after that. Sigismund accepted Fruzhin to his court and recognized his claim to the Bulgarian throne. He stayed in Hungary as a member of the Order of the Dragon with some other famous noblemen like Stefan Lazarević, Filipo Skolari, Vlad Dracula and Skenderbeg.

Ecumenical Patriarch Joseph II of Constantinople may also have been an illegitimate half-brother of Fruzhin's.

Probably in 1404, Fruzhin headed an anti-Ottoman revolt in the Bulgarian lands along with his cousin Constantine II, Ivan Sracimir's son and last reigning Bulgarian monarch at Vidin. Despite conflicting historical details regarding the span and size of the revolt, there are hints that Constantine and Fruzhin managed to restore their rule over at least a part of the Bulgarian lands. However, the uprising was crushed (probably in 1413 or 1418) and Fruzhin returned to Hungary.

In 1425, Fruzhin participated in Hungarian service in a joint Hungarian and Wallachian raid of the cities of Vidin, Oryahovo and Silistra on the Danube along with Dan II and Filipo Scolari. Sigismund rewarded Fruzhin's military service with a noble title, entrusting him with the governance of Temes County and presenting him with a personal domain at Lippa. Fruzhin visited the Republic of Ragusa (Dubrovnik) and the leaders of the Albanian revolt, in 1435 on a secret diplomat mission of Sigismund.

In 1444, he participated in Władysław III of Poland's Crusade of Varna, an attempt to drive the Ottoman Turks away from Bulgaria and Europe. The campaign ended in disaster, as Władysław III died in the Battle of Varna at the Black Sea.

An Ottoman register of 1454/5 mentions Fruzhin as being active in the area between Svrljig and Pirot, having been granted special permission by the authorities of the Sanjak of Vidin to hire men to secure mountain passes there. It additionally mentions him being accompanied in this by his three sons: Stoyan, Stoyko, and Stanislav. The last son, Stanislav, is identified with the boyar Stanko Kusan who held Lovech against the Ottomans until 1446; if the two are identical, Kusan would represent not a family name but more likely a nickname, possibly indicating diminutive stature (Bulgarian: къс, romanized: kŭs; "short"). Further descendants of Fruzhin are attested living in Hungary until at least the late 16th century, prompting speculation that the pretender Ivan Shishman II may have been a genuine member of the Sratsimir dynasty.

== Death ==
Fruzhin died in Brașov in 1460.
