= Sratsimir dynasty =

Bulgarian royal dynasty (1331-1422)

House of Sratsimir Срацимир
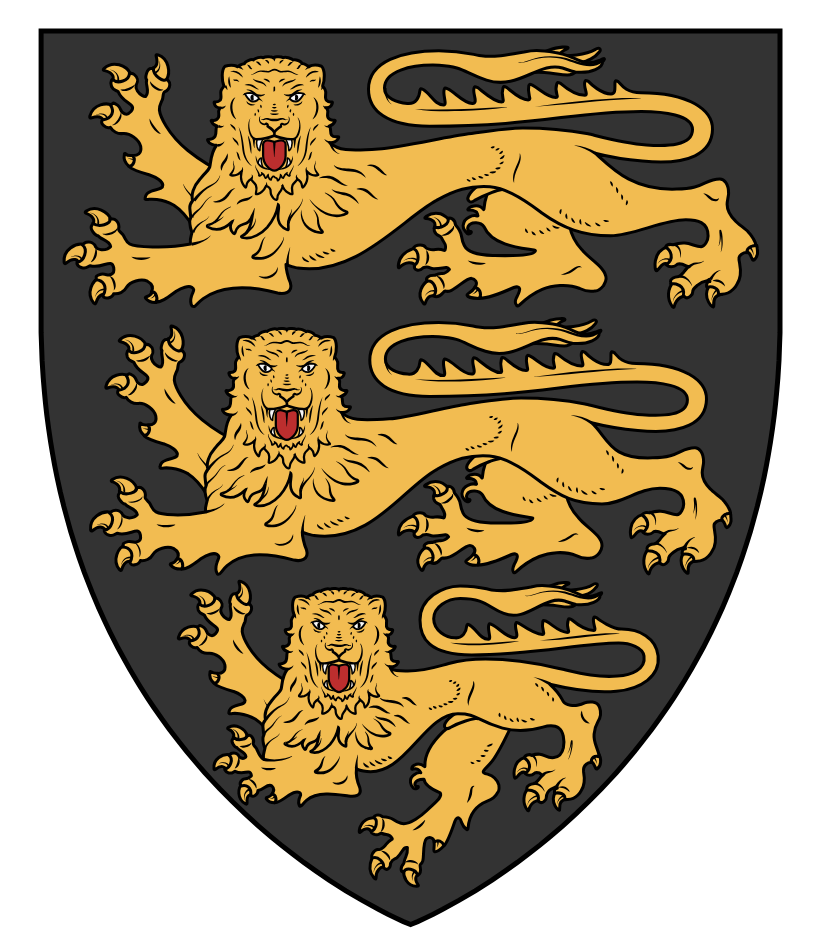
- Digitalized version of the Coat of arms according to the 14th-century German Miltenberger Wappenbuch
- Parent house: Asen dynasty (matrilineal); Shishman dynasty (matrilineal)
- Country: Second Bulgarian Empire; Tsardom of Vidin
- Founded: Prior to 1330
- Founder: Sratsimir
- Final ruler: Constantine II
- Final head: Durma Shishman (last known)
- Titles: Emperor of Bulgaria; Patriarch of Constantinople; Despot of Valona; Count of Temes
- Dissolution: 16th century
- Deposition: 1422

The House of Sratsimir or Sracimir (Bulgarian: Срацимир), also referred to as the Sratsimirovtsi (Bulgarian: Срацимировци), was a medieval Bulgarian dynasty which became the last ruling house of the Second Bulgarian Empire (1331–1422). The Stratsimir dynasty was matrilineally descended from the previous Bulgarian royal houses of Asen and Shishman. After its deposition following the Ottoman conquest of Bulgaria, princes of the Sratsimir dynasty survived in exile in the neighbouring Kingdom of Hungary until at least the second half of the 16th century.

== Family tree ==
- Sratsimir, despot, married to Keratsa Petritsa (sister of Michael Asen III)
  - Ivan Alexander, Bulgarian emperor (1331–1371)
    - Michael Asen IV, Bulgarian junior co-emperor
    - Ivan Asen IV, Bulgarian junior co-emperor
    - Ivan Sratsimir, Bulgarian emperor in Vidin (1356–c. 1397)
      - Constantine II, Bulgarian emperor in Vidin (c. 1397–1422)
      - Dorothea, Queen of Bosnia, married Tvrtko I of Bosnia
        - (→ Kotromanić dynasty)
    - Ivan Shishman, Bulgarian emperor in Tarnovo (1371–1395)
      - Alexander
      - Joseph II, Patriarch of Constantinople (1416–1439)
      - Fruzhin, claimant Bulgarian emperor (1422–1460), Count of Temes
        - Shishman
          - Mihul (Michael) Bozyasi (fl. 1463)
          - Istvan (Stephen) Bosyazi (fl. 1463–1464)
          - Sandrin (Alexander) Shishman (fl. 1464–1467), commander of Severin
            - Philip Shishman
              - Istvan Shishman (16th century)
              - Radoslav Shishman (16th century; fl. 1515)
              - Vladislav Shishman (16th century)
              - Ferenc Shishman (died 1550)
                - Durma Shishman de Gattaya (second half of the 16th century)
        - Stoyan (fl. 1454)
        - Stoyko (fl. 1454)
        - Stanislav (fl. 1454)
        - Daughters
      - Keratsa
    - Ivan Asen V, Bulgarian junior co-emperor
    - Kera Tamara, married a "despot Constantine"; later part of the harem of Ottoman sultan Murad I
    - Desislava
    - Vasilisa
  - Helena, Empress of Serbia, married Stefan Dušan of Serbia
    - (→ Nemanjić dynasty)
  - John Komnenos Asen, Despot of Valona (c. 1345–1363)
    - Alexander Komnenos Asen, Despot of Valona (c. 1363–1371)
    - Daughter, married Balša II
      - (→ Balšić noble family)
  - Michael
  - Theodora

== Later claims ==
Two later Bulgarian rebels during the Ottoman period, Ivan Shishman II (1598) and Rostislav Stratimirovic (1686) claimed descent from the Sratsimir dynasty, though their genealogies are unverified.
