= Ivan Asen V =

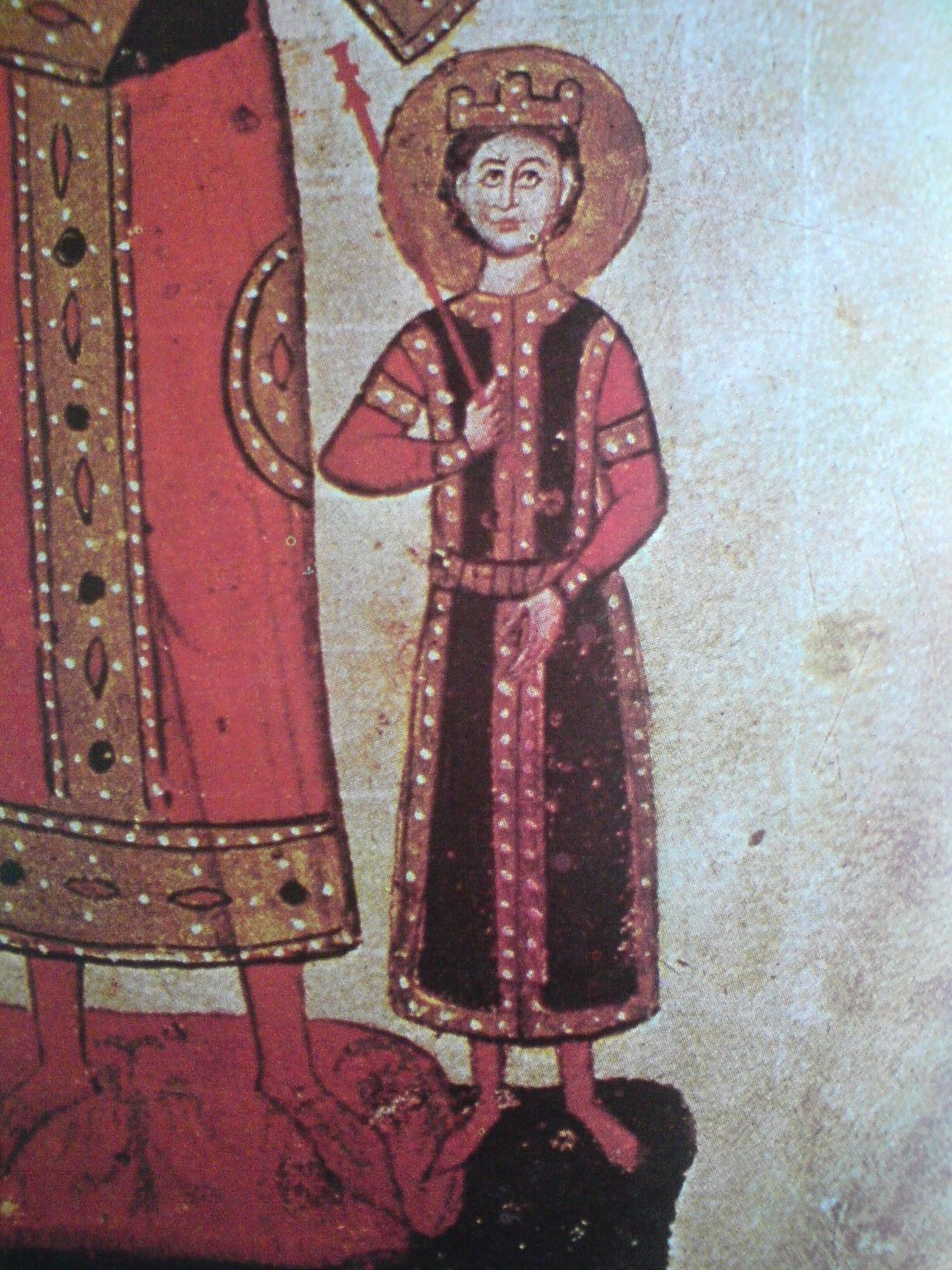
- Died: 1388 or 1371/1372
- Spouse: Unknown
- Issue: 2 daughters
- House: Sratsimir
- Father: Ivan Alexander
- Mother: Sarah-Theodora

Ivan Asen V (Bulgarian: Иван Асен V) was the second son of emperor Ivan Alexander (r. 1331-1371) and his second wife Sarah-Theodora (r. 1337-1371). He was probably named after his elder brother Ivan Asen IV who died in 1349 in battle against the Ottoman Turks near Ihtiman or Sofia.

Together with his father and younger brother Ivan Shishman, Ivan Asen V presided over the church synods at Tarnovo in the late 1360s.

In his burial inscription ordered by Kira Maria, the first wife of his elder brother Ivan Shishman (r. 1371-1395), is written that he was buried in 1388 after he was killed by the Turks. It was written that he was in danger of "falling from the grace of the faith" which means that he was probably allured by the Ottomans to convert to Islam. From the same inscription is known that the prince had two daughters whose names were not mentioned.

Recent studies of archaeologist Nikolay Ovcharov show that Ivan Asen V probably died in an engagement against the Ottomans, led by Lala Şahin at Sofia Valley.

== Sources ==
- Fine, Jr., John V.A. (1987). The Late Medieval Balkans. Ann Arbor: University of Michigan Press. ISBN 0-472-08260-4.
- Златарски, Васил (Vasil Zlatarski) (2005). България през XIV-XV век (Bulgaria during the 14th and 15th Centuries) (in Bulgarian). Изток–Запад (Anubis). ISBN 954-321-172-8.
