= Dragana Lazarević =

Empress consort of Bulgaria
- Tenure: 1390s–1395
- Born: 1371; Prilepac
- Died: 1395 (aged 23–24)
- Spouse: Emperor Ivan Shishman of Bulgaria
- House: Lazarević
- Father: Prince Lazar Hrebeljanović of Serbia
- Mother: Princess Milica Nemanjić

Dragana Lazarević (Serbian: Драгана Лазаревић, Bulgarian: Драгана Лазаревич; 1371·1395) was a Serbian princess and the Empress consort of Bulgaria as the second wife of Ivan Shishman (r. 1371–1395). She was a daughter of the Serbian Prince Lazar and Princess Milica Nemanjić.

== Early life ==
Dragana was a daughter of Lazar and Milica Nemanjić, thus belonged to the Lazarević and Nemanjić dynasties. She was likely the second of five daughters, and was named after her paternal aunt Dragana, the wife of magnate Musa.

Dragana married into the Bulgarian dynasty in ca. 1386 at a time when her father tried to consolidate the Balkan rulers and magnates through marriage alliances in order to plan for conflict with the Ottoman Empire.

== Consort ==
There are almost no historical sources about her. There is a text in the Boril Obituary concerning the consorts of Ivan Shishman:

...To Kira Maria, the pious empress to the great emperor Ivan Shishman, eternal memory. To mistress Desislava, mother of the pious empress Maria - to the great emperor Ivan Shishman, called in angel's form Debora, eternal memory...

Based on that text, Bulgarian historian Plamen Pavlov suggested a new theory about her; he assumed that since Lazar had no wife named Desislava, it is possible that the first wife of Ivan Shishman was Maria and Dragana was called Kira Maria, unless there is a mistake in the paragraph.

It is possible that she was the mother of Fruzhin and Alexander.

== Sources ==
- Божилов, Иван (1994). Фамилията на Асеневци (1186–1460). Генеалогия и просопография [The Family of the Asens (1186–1460). Genealogy and Prosopography] (in Bulgarian). София: Издателство на Българската академия на науките. ISBN 954-430-264-6.
- Mihaljčić, Rade (2001) [1984]. Лазар Хребељановић: историја, култ, предање. Belgrade: Srpska školska knjiga; Knowledge. ISBN 86-83565-01-7.
- Pavlov, Plamen (2006). Търновските царици. В.Т.:ДАР-РХ.
- Purković, Miodrag (1956). Princeze iz kuće Nemanjića. Avala.
- Purković, Miodrag (1996) [1957]. Кћери кнеза Лазара [Daughters of Prince Lazar]. Belgrade.
- Veselinović, Andrija; Ljušić, Radoš (2008) [2001]. Srpske dinastije (in Serbian). Službeni glasnik. ISBN 978-86-7549-921-3.

Dragana Lazarević Born: ? Died: ?
Royal titles
Preceded by Kira Maria	Empress consort of Bulgaria; 1380s–1395	Vacant Annexation by Ottoman Empire Title next held by Eleonore Reuss of Köstritz as Princess of Bulgaria
