= Battle of Sofia Valley =

Battle of Sofia valley
- Part of the Bulgarian–Ottoman wars
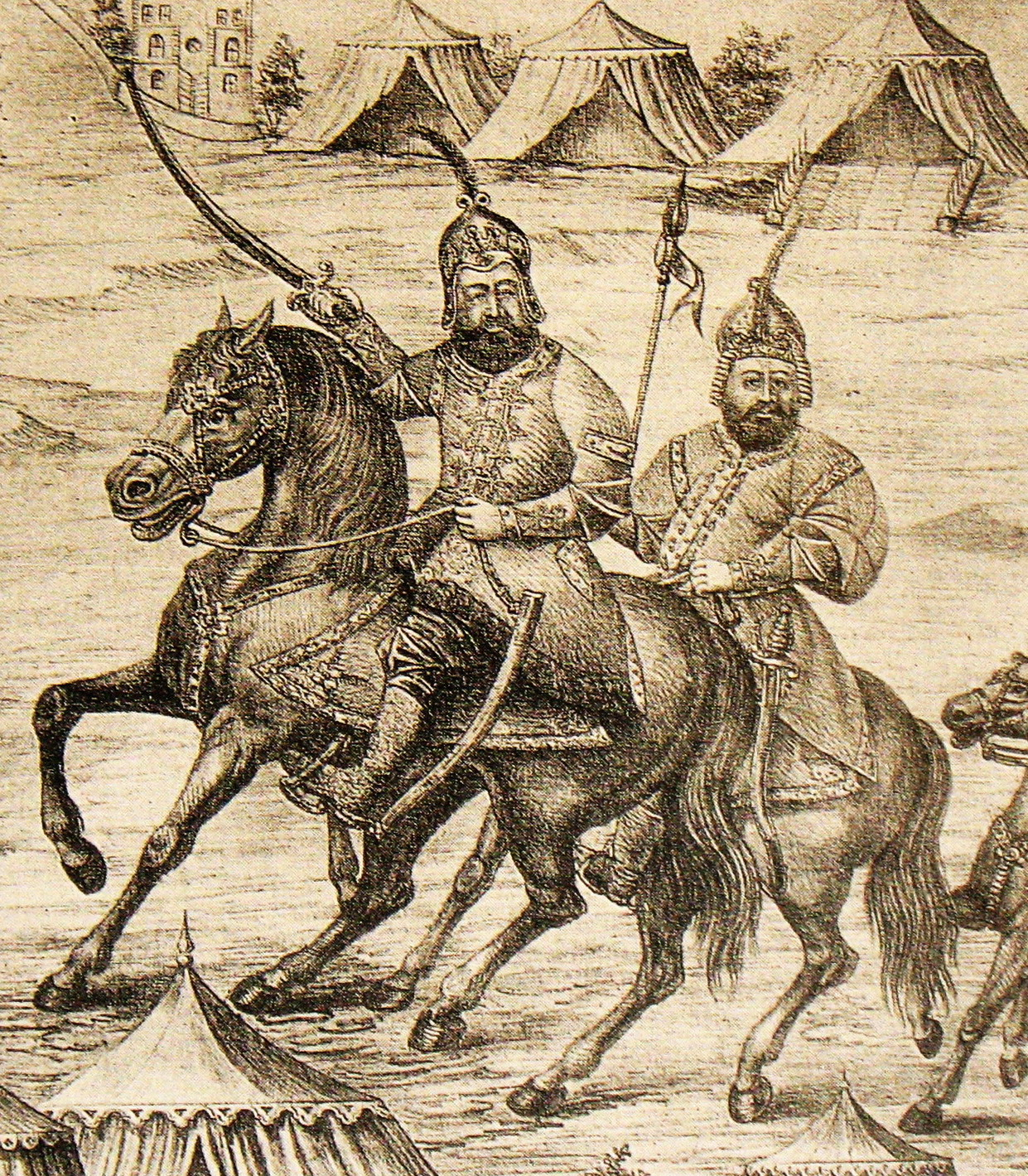
- Two Turkish generals prior to the large battle
Date	1372
Location	Sofia valley, today Bulgaria
Result	Bulgarian victory: Bulgarians repulse Ottoman forces from Sofia; Heavy casualties on both sides; Final Ottoman retreat; Severe weakening of Bulgarian Empire

Belligerents
(Second Bulgarian Empire) Bulgarian Empire	Ottoman Empire

Commanders and leaders
(Second Bulgarian Empire) Ivan Shishman	Shahin Pasha

Casualties and losses
(Second Bulgarian Empire) Heavy	Heavy

The Battle of Sofia valley took place in 1371 or 1372, near what is today Sofia, after the battle of Maritsa and the fall of Bitola to the Ottoman Turks. The result of the battle is a Bulgarian victory.

Soon after the battle of Maritsa, the armies of Murad I embarked on another campaign overrunning Northern Thrace and forcing the new Bulgarian tsar Ivan Shishman to retreat north of the Balkan Mountains. After prolonged and fierce sieges many fortresses fell: the town of Diampol, managed to resist for a prolongued time against the forces led by Timurtash, however, the defenders of the fortress werè eventually forced to surrender because of food shortage. The Ottomans conquered most of the Rhodopes, Kostenets, Ihtiman, and Samokov. After the conquest of Bitola, Lala Şahin planned to seize Sofia but before he could reach the city, the Ottomans encroached with the Bulgarians on the Sofia Valley. In the bloody clash both sides suffered heavy casualties, but the Ottomans were repulsed and forced to retreat. In 1373 Ivan Shishman was forced to negotiate a humiliating peace treaty: he became an Ottoman vassal strengthening the union with a marriage between Murad and Shishman's sister Kera Tamara. As a compensation, the Ottomans returned some of the conquered lands, including Ihtiman and Samokov. In his popular work Istoriya Slavyanobolgarskaya, Paisius of Hilendar gives an information about the battle:

“When Ivan Alexander died, three of his sons remained – Sratsimir, Shishman and Asen. Ivan Shishman became tsar. Then Murad broke the peace and went on a campaign against Bulgaria. In the great battle, the Bulgarians won, but Asen died.”

According to professor Nikolay Ovcharov, that "Asen" is the own Ivan Asen V of Bulgaria.
