= Desislava of Bulgaria =

Princess of Bulgaria (fl. c. 1300s)

Desislava
- Princess of Bulgaria
- Manuscript miniature of Desislava (Tetraevangelia of Ivan Alexander).
- Born: Circa 1301; Bulgaria
- Died: Unknown
- Burial: Unknown
- Spouse: Prince Constantine
- House: Sratsimir
- Father: Ivan Alexander
- Mother: Sarah-Theodora siblings: Vasilisa, Kera Tamara, Ivan Shishman, Ivan Asem, Kera Maria.

Desislava of Bulgaria (Bulgarian: Десислава) (fl. c. 1300s) was a 14th-century Bulgarian princess. She was the youngest daughter of Tsar Ivan Alexander of Bulgaria and his second wife Theodora, a converted Jewish woman.
