= Dionisiy Divniy =

Dionisiy Divniy (Bulgarian: Дионисий Дивний) was a Bulgarian writer and translator of the second half of the 14th century. He was a Tarnovo Literary School representative.

Dionisiy was a disciple of the cleric and noted hesychast Theodosius of Tarnovo. Records for his work are contained in the Passional for Theodosius of Tarnovo written by the Patriarch of Constantinople Callistus I. Dionisiy was mentioned received much attention among the most notable disciples of Theodosius. His skills in translation of books from Greek to Bulgarian was emphasized and hence his nickname Divniy, meaning marvelous or wonderful. Callistus wrote that Dionisiy translated many books. It is also mentioned in the passional that he was present in the council against the heretics in Tarnovo, organized by emperor Ivan Alexander in 1360.

When in 1469 Vladislav the Grammarian made a copy of the works of John Chrysostom, he specified that the translation was made by Dionisiy Divniy.
