= Kira Maria =

Empress consort of Bulgaria
- Tenure: 1371–138?
- Born: Unknown; Bulgarian Empire
- Spouse: Ivan Shishman

Kira Maria (Bulgarian: Кира Мария), or only Maria, was a Bulgarian empress consort, first wife of Ivan Shishman (r. 1371–1395). There are almost no historical sources about her. Her name is mentioned in the Boril obituary in the following manner:

...To Kira Maria, the pious empress
to the great emperor Ivan Shishman, eternal memory.
To mistress Desislava, mother of the pious
empress Maria - to the great emperor Ivan Shishman, called in angel's form Debora, eternal memory...

The interpretation of the cited extract is not certain. It is possible that Maria and Kira Maria were two different women. It is known that Ivan Shishman had a second wife - Dragana, daughter of Prince Lazar of Serbia and Milica. Prince Lazar did not have a wife called Desislava and therefore it is possible that the name of the emperor's first wife was only Maria, while Dragana could have been called Kira Maria, unless there was a mistake in the paragraph and the places of the two empresses were changed.

Another possibility is that the two names were of one person, the first wife of the emperor, mentioned once as Kira Maria and then as Maria. That option, however, raises the question why is the name of the second wife of Ivan Shishman omitted.

It has been suggested that Kira Maria descended by an important noble family from the capital Tarnovo. The names of children produced by the first marriage of Ivan Shishman are unknown. He had two sons Alexander and Fruzhin but it is unknown from by wife they were born. It is likely that he had other children that died in their infancy and were mentioned in the Boril obituary.

== Footnotes ==
Kira Maria Born: ? Died: ?
Royal titles
| Preceded by Sarah-Theodora | Empress consort of Bulgaria; 1371–138? | Succeeded by Dragana |
