= Keratsa of Bulgaria =

Byzantine Empress consort (1348 – c. 1400)

Keratsa-Maria
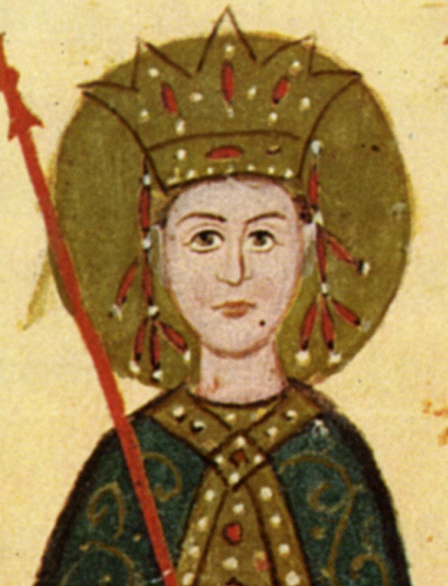
- Manuscript miniature of Keratsa (Tetraevangelia of Ivan Alexander).

Byzantine Empress consort
- Tenure: 1362 – 1 July 1379
- Tenure: May 1381 – June 1385
- Tenure: 1399 – 1400
- Born: 1348; Bulgaria
- Died: c. 1400; Byzantine Empire
- Spouse: Andronikos IV Palaiologos
- Issue: John VII Palaiologos
- House: House of Shishman; House of Palaiologus
- Father: Ivan Alexander
- Mother: Sarah-Theodora

Keratsa of Bulgaria (1348 – c. 1400) was a Bulgarian princess and Byzantine empress consort as the wife of Andronikos IV Palaiologos. She was the mother of John VII Palaiologos.

== Early life ==
Keratsa was born in 1348 as the princess of Bulgaria, daughter of Tsar Ivan Aleksandar of Bulgaria. She spent her early years at the Bulgarian court and remained there during the empire's final periods of stability, which came about as a result of Ivan Aleksandar's expansion of Bulgaria's territory and improvement of its economy. She left the country in 1356 when she was about seven or eight.

Based on her depiction, Keratsa was not particularly prominent, exemplified by the image of her brother Ivan Asen's funeral, where Keratsa is seen placed in the background. In another family portrait, which features her father and three brothers, she is absent. However, a third family portrait has her included and prominently placed alongside Ivan Alexander, her sisters, and the husband of her sister Kera Tamara. Lilyana Yordanova, an art historian, argues that Keratsa's red dress and green mantle on one of the portraits suggests she was already betrothed in 1355.

== Marriage to Andronikos IV ==
According to Byzantine historian Nicephorus Gregoras, Keratsa was married to the Byzantine Emperor Andronikos IV Palaiologos, the porphyrogenitus of Emperor John V Palaiologos, some time between 1355-1357 when they were both approximately eight or nine. Bulgaria and Byzantium had gone to war about fifteen years earlier, and the marriage was part of a peace treaty between the two nations. At the time, Byzantium was struggling due to attacks from the Turks, Serbs, and Bulgarians, as well as civil wars and the Black Plague. By forming a marriage alliance with Bulgaria, Byzantium protected itself from further military conflicts with Bulgaria and secured an ally against the Turks. However, the Byzantines eventually became dissatisfied with the union, sparking a conflict between the two nations in 1364.

The poem "Vatican cod. gr. 1851" is suspected to have been written about Keratsa's child marriage to Andronikos IV, which took place immediately after her arrival in Byzantium by ship. The poem opens with the King (Ivan Aleksandar) of a Western land (Bulgaria) debating whether or not he should give Keratsa to Byzantium; he decides to do it for the sake of the empire. The king then sends a messenger to Byzantium, and all the Byzantines rejoice when they hear the news. Then the princess arrives in the great city, and the emperor sends all female courtiers to receive her and prepare to be the empress.

Upon arrival in Byzantium, Keratsa changed her name to Keratsa-Maria and was educated among the children of the palace alongside her husband. Keratsa and Andronikos grew up together and became close, and Keratsa was often at the side of her husband. She remained by her husband's side throughout many hardships, including war, exile, imprisonment, and difficulties conceiving. They had one child together, John VII, in 1370.

== Historical context and politics ==
Keratsa was empress by marriage to Andronikos IV Palaiologos from 1376 to 1379 and from 1381 to 1385. She became empress, as Byzantium was recovering from recent civil wars and the Black Plague and rapidly losing territory to the Turks, Serbs, and Bulgarians. Keratsa contributed to the stability of Byzantium and helped prevent the empire's collapse during these difficulties.

Much of Keratsa's life took place during the struggles of Andronikos IV and her son, John VII Palaiologos. The historian Petra Melichar writes extensively about Keratsa-Maria's life. Melichar says that Keratsa would have accompanied Andronikos IV and John VII in important diplomatic missions throughout the civil disputes as a loyal wife and mother, and that she would have played an active role in the disputes. The Spanish traveler R.G Clavijo says that when Andronikos had been blinded by John V with hot vinegar in 1373, Keratsa partially healed the blindness. According to the Vita Caroli Zeni, Maria had a jailor's wife tortured in 1376, because she held Venetian plans to rescue John V from Tenedos. By doing this, she foiled the Venetians' plans to escape.

Melichar also asserts that Maria likely governed Selymbria in 1390 in John VII's absence on a military campaign. In 1392, Keratsa-Maria gave a Gospel book to Peter Philargos (who later became Antipope Alexander V). It reads thus: "This most holy Gospel Book was given to me, Brother Peter… [I received it] from the exalted and illustrious lady of the Romaioi, Empress Maria, who took the name Makaria, after she came with her son, the most exalted and illustrious emperor of the Romaioi, Lord John Palaiologos ... in the year 1392."

== Widow, nun, and senior empress ==
Sometime before 1392, but after Andronikos' death, Keratsa-Maria became a nun, taking the name Makaria. According to Alice-Mary Talbot, taking this status after becoming a widow was not uncommon at the time to ensure financial security. Additionally, becoming a nun gave wealthy women opportunity to recover control of their dowries to use them for pious purposes. Perhaps this was how Keratsa was able to exercise charity to the extent she did while being an empress. When Keratsa became senior empress in 1399, she was still a nun. (Note: Although certainly not the historical norm, some Byzantine empresses became nuns and then went back to ruling. In 1055, Theodora Porphyrogenita, the last Macedonian dynasty ruler, came out of retirement from the monastery on two separate occasions: in 1042 and 1055. In 1042, she was installed by a mob to co-rule with her sister Zoe. In 1055, she voluntarily came out of retirement in the monastery to take the vacant throne for herself.)

In 1399, Keratsa's son John VII was entrusted with co-emperorship, ruling over Constantinople. Since John VII's wife Eirene was young and inexperienced, Maria assumed the position of senior empress. As empress in Constantinople, Keratsa was moved by the plight of her subjects. She and her son provided a dowry for Tzykandylina, the daughter of Anna Palaiologina, whose mother had died. That same year, Maria helped a monk Methodios, who had fallen on hard times due to the multiple sieges of Constantinople. For help, Methodios appealed to the Patriarch and Maria. Additionally, Maria reduced the rent of the Church of St. Euphemia for the Patriarch, Matthew I.

In May 1399, Empress Maria put John Kallikrinites in charge of her monastery, Bassos. Melchar says that the document verifying this event is a rare evidence that late Byzantine empresses had courts of their own. Hill and Liz argue that Byzantine Empresses did not have any official power before more modern ones like Keratsa. Instead, they relied on personal influence to achieve the results they wanted.

== Death ==
Keratsa-Maria died around 1400 and was most likely buried next to her husband at the Pantokratoros Monastery. She is known for her role in the diplomatic relations between Bulgaria and Byzantium during a turbulent period, as well as being featured in a famous manuscript miniature from the Tetraevangelia of Ivan Alexander, a Bulgarian illuminated manuscript.

== Works cited ==
- Crampton, R. J. A Concise History of Bulgaria. 2nd ed. Cambridge, UK ; Cambridge University Press, 2005.
- Georgieva, Sashka. “Marital Unions as a Tool of Diplomacy between Bulgaria and Byzantium from 1280 to 1396.” Bulgaria Mediaevalis 5, no. 1 (2014): 453–78.
- Gregoras, Nicephorus. Byzantina Historia: Graece et Latine. Translated by J. Reisacker and N. Rosenstein. Vol. 3. Bonn: Weber, 1829.
- Hennessy, Cecily, “A child bride and her representation in the Vatican Epithalamion, cod. gr. 1851” Byzantine and Modern Greek Studies, 30, no. 2 (2006): 115–150
- Hilsdale, Cecily, “Constructing a Byzantine 'Augustu:’ A Greek Book for a French Bride” The Art Bulletin, 87, no. 3 (2005): 458–483
- James, Liz; Hill, Barbara (1999). "Women and Politics in the Byzantine Empire: Imperial Women". Women in Medieval Western European Culture (1st ed.). Routledge. doi:10.4324/9780203054871-13.
- Kalavrezou, Ioli, Angeliki E Laiou, Arthur M. Sackler Museum., and Harvard University. Art Museums. Byzantine Women and Their World. Cambridge: Harvard University Art Museums, 2003.
- Kaldellis, Anthony. The New Roman Empire: A History of Byzantium. New York, NY: Oxford University Press, 2024.
- Melichar, Petra. Empresses of Late Byzantium: Foreign Brides, Mediators and Pious Women. Berlin: Peter Lang, 2019.
- Vasiliev, A. A. History of the Byzantine Empire 324-1453. Madison: The Univ. of Wisconsin Press, 1961.
- Talbot, Anne-Marie. Varieties of Monastic Experience in Byzantium 800-1453. University of Notre Dame Press. 2019.
- Treadgold, Warren. A History of Byzantine State and Society. Stanford University Press. 1997.
- Yordanova, Lilyana. “The Story Behind the Image: The Literary Patronage of Tsar Ivan Alexander of Bulgaria between Ostentation and Decline?” In Late Byzantium Reconsidered: The Arts of the Palaiologan Era in the Mediterranean. Routledge, 2019. https://doi.org/10.4324/9781351244831.

Keratsa of Bulgaria Shishman Born: 1348 Died: 1390
Royal titles
Preceded by Helena Kantakouzene	Byzantine Empress consort 1376–1379	Succeeded by Helena Kantakouzene
