= Euthymius of Tarnovo =

Patriarch of Bulgaria from 1375 to 1393

Свети Патриарх Евтимий Търновски Saint Euthymius of Tarnovo
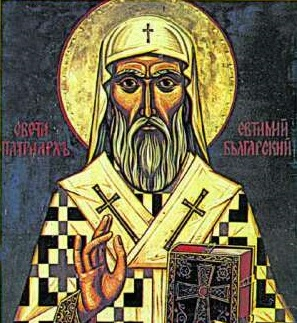
- Icon of Saint Euthymius of Tarnovo

Patriarch of All Bulgaria
- Born: c. 1325; Tarnovo, Bulgarian Empire
- Died: c. 1402–1404; Bachkovo Monastery
- Venerated in: Eastern Orthodox Church
- Feast: 20 January

Saint Euthymius of Tarnovo (also Evtimiy; Bulgarian: Свети Евтимий Търновски, romanized: Sveti Evtimiy Tarnovski; c. 1325 – c. 1402/1404) was Patriarch of Bulgaria between 1375 and 1393. Regarded as one of the most important figures of medieval Bulgaria, Euthymius was the last head of the Bulgarian Orthodox Church in the Second Bulgarian Empire. Arguably the best esteemed of all Bulgarian patriarchs, Euthymius was a supporter of hesychasm and an authoritative figure in the Eastern Orthodox world of the time.

== Early years ==
Born around 1325 (between 1320 and 1330) and possibly an offspring of the eminent Tsamblak family of the capital Tarnovo, Euthymius was educated at the monastery schools in and around the city and became a monk. He joined the Kilifarevo Monastery around 1350, attracted by the fame of Theodosius of Tarnovo. Theodosius appointed him his first assistant in 1363 and the two went together to Tsarigrad, with Theodosius dying soon afterwards.

Euthymius then consecutively joined the Studion monastery and the Great Lavra of Athanasius the Athonite on Mount Athos. He was influenced by outstanding scholars and reformers of Southeastern Europe's spiritual life, such as Gregory the Sinaite, Gregory Palamas, Callistus Philotheus and John Kukuzelis. He was sent into exile on the island of Lemnos by Byzantine Emperor John V Palaiologos and, upon his release, returned to the Bulgarian Zograf Monastery on Mount Athos. It was there that he first reflected on the spelling reforms and planned corrections to the translations of the clerical books.

== Activity in Bulgaria ==
Around 1371 Euthymius returned to Bulgaria and founded the Holy Trinity Patriarchal Monastery near Tarnovo, where he grounded the Tarnovo Literary School. He established orthographic rules and corrected inaccurately translated religious books by comparing them to the Greek originals. These corrected texts became models for the Orthodox churches using Church Slavonic language: Bulgaria, Serbia, Romania, and Russia. Gregory Tsamblak, his biographer, compared Euthymius' work to that of Moses and Egyptian king Ptolemy I.

In 1375, following the death of Patriarch Joanicius, Euthymius was elected to become his successor. A supporter of asceticism, Euthymius aimed to persecute heresies and moral decay. Euthymius became a prominent figure in the Orthodox world and a number of metropolitans and hegumens addressed him to interpret theological matters.

There are 15 known works by Euthymius, including liturgical books, laudatory works, passionals and epistles. Among his literary disciples are Gregory Tsamblak, Metropolitan of Kiev; Cyprian, Metropolitan of Moscow; Joasaph of Bdin and Constantine of Kostenets.

== Establishment of Tarnovo Literary School and language reform ==
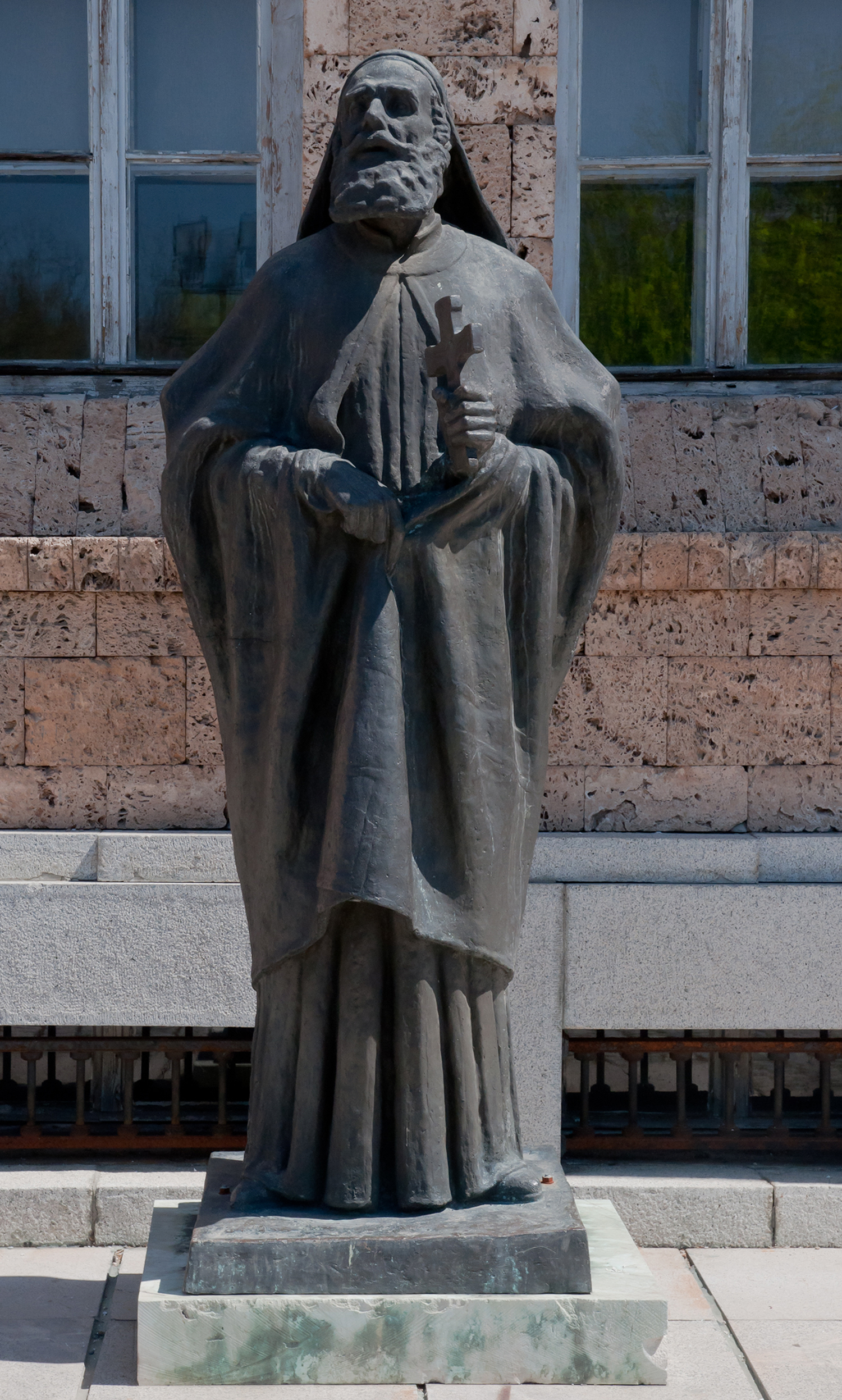
Statue of Patriarch Evtimiy at the Veliko Tarnovo town gallery.

During the time of patriarch Theodosius of Tarnovo Euthymius founded and ran the Tarnovo literary school, which was to quickly become an important cultural center of the Slavic Christian world.

Euthymius initiated a language reform in Old Bulgarian that was widely influential to the standardized literary languages of Serbia, Walachia, Moldova, and the Russian principalities. Gregory Tsamblak describes Euthymius' language reform in the following manner.

When he [Euthymius] had destroyed all the old [books], this second lawgiver, descending from the top of the spiritual mountain and carrying in his hands [the books] (similar to the Tablets written by God) at which he had labored, delivered to the Church in truth a heavenly treasure – all new, all true, in accord with the Gospel, unshakable in the force of the dogmas, like the water of life for the souls of the pious, like a knife for the tongues of the heretics, like fire for their [heretics’] faces. And he cried out with Paul: ‘The old has passed away. Behold! Everything has become new’ [2 Cor. 5:17].

== Works ==
Partial list of works:

- Hagiographies
  - "Hagiography of St. Ivan of Rila"
  - "Hagiography of St. Ilarion Maglenski"
  - "Hagiography of St. Philothea Temnishka"
  - "Hagiography of St. Petka of Tarnovo"
- Praises
  - "Praise for Mikhail Warrior"
  - "Praise for Ioan Polivotski"
  - "Praise for St. Nedelya"
  - "Praise for St. Constantine and Helena"
- Letters
  - "Letter to Cyprian"
  - "Letter to metropolitan Arsenius"
  - "Letter to Nikodim – monk of Tismana"

== Fall of Tarnovo and its consequences ==
In the spring of 1393 the son of Ottoman Sultan Bayezid I, Suleyman Çelebi, laid siege to the Bulgarian capital Tarnovo with his sizable forces. With Tsar Ivan Shishman out of the city (leading the remnants of his troops to the fortress of Nikopol), Euthymius was the one entrusted with the defense of Tarnovo. After a three-month siege on 17 July 1393, the Ottomans captured the capital despite its ferocious resistance; Gregory Tsamblak several years later suggested the conquest was due to treason from one of the non-Christian neighborhoods of Tarnovo.

Joasaph of Bdin, Metropolitan of Vidin, a contemporary of the event, described it as follows: "A great Muslim invasion happened and total destruction was done with this city and its surroundings." According to Gregory Tsamblak, churches were turned into mosques, priests were expelled and substituted with "teachers of shamelessness." 110 noted citizens of Tarnovo and boyars were massacred, but Patriarch Euthymius was reprieved and sent into exile in the theme of Macedonia (contemporary Thrace), possibly in the Bachkovo Monastery. He is supposed to have died there in 1402–1404. The Tarnovo Patriarchate thereupon ceased to exist as the Bulgarian church lost its independence and became subordinate to the Patriarchate of Constantinople until 1870.

Patriarch Euthymius has been canonized and his memory is honored on the same day as that of his namesake Euthymius the Great, 20 January.

== Commemoration ==
St. Evtimiy Crag on Livingston Island in the South Shetland Islands, Antarctica is named after Patriarch Euthymius of Bulgaria.

== Sources ==
- Ivanova, Kl. (1986) (in Bulgarian). Патриарх Евтимий. С.
- Патриарх Евтимий Търновски и неговото време. Материали от националната научна сесия за 600 г. от заточението на св. Евтимий, патриарх Търновски, Велико Търново, 6 октомври 1993 г. Ред. кол. Георги Данчев и др. Велико Търново, 1998 (Проглас).

Preceded by Patriarch Joannicius II	Patriarch of Bulgaria; 1375–1393	Succeeded by Office abolished
