= Tarnovo Literary School =

One of the 366 miniatures of the Tetraevangelia of Ivan Alexander (1355-1356) - one of the most famous works of the Tarnovo Literary School.

The Tarnovo Literary School (Bulgarian: Търновска книжовна школа) of the late 14th and 15th centuries was a major medieval Bulgarian cultural academy with important contribution to the Medieval Bulgarian literature established in the capital of Bulgaria Tarnovo. It was part of the Tarnovo School of Art which was characteristic of the culture of the Second Bulgarian Empire.

With the orthographic reform of Saint Evtimiy of Tarnovo and prominent representatives such as Gregory Tsamblak or Constantine of Kostenets the school influenced Russian, Serbian, Wallachian and Moldavian medieval culture. It is well known in Russia as the second South Slavic influence.

== Origin and development ==
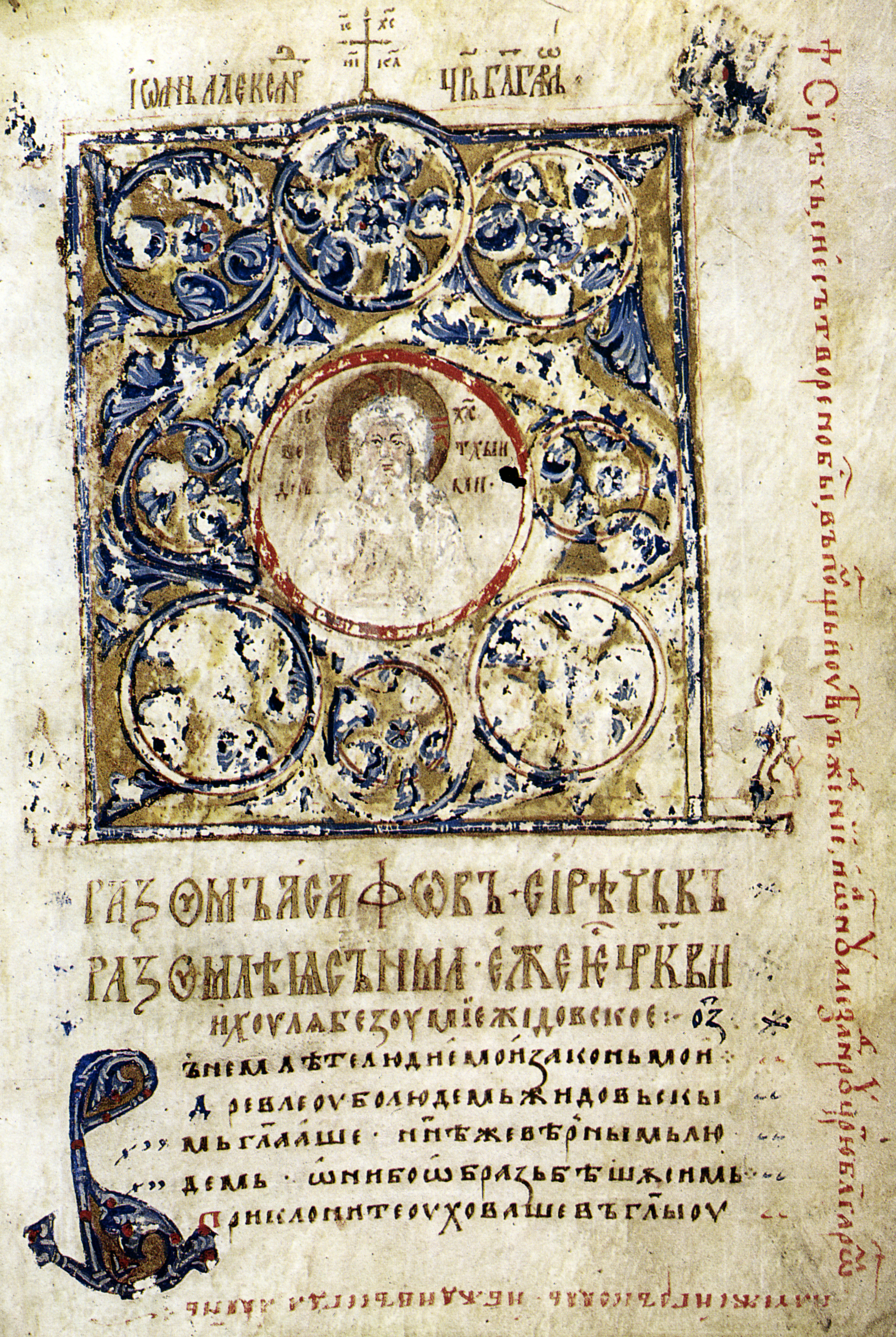
Sofia Psalter produced in 1337 belonged to the royal family of Tsar Ivan Alexander of Bulgaria, early work of the Tarnovo Literary School.

The main prerequisite for the Tarnovo Literary School was the cultural revival of the late 14th century. It was largely due to the interest of Emperor Ivan Alexander (1331–1371) in literature and art and the traditions that he left to his sons and successors Ivan Shishman and Ivan Stratsimir in that direction. Patriarch Theodosius of Tarnovo also had some credit to the establishment of the school.

The school was established in the capital of the Bulgarian Empire Tarnovo by Saint Evtimiy of Tarnovo. It established his orthographic and linguistic reform rules for the Bulgarian language and wrongly translated texts were corrected, becoming models for the Orthodox churches of Bulgaria, Serbia, Wallachia, Moldavia and Russia that also used the Church Slavonic language.

The main work of the writers of the Tarnovo Literary School included writing original literature, translating books from Greek and creating compilations.

== Characteristics ==
The literature of the Tarnovo literary school is divided into two major parts - religious and secular. The religious literature is represented by praising epistles, passionals, hymns and others. The main task for the authors of the passionals was to glorify the saints and there is a marked stress on the element of miracles which is compulsory for that genre used by most of the writers, such as Evtimiy and Tsamblak. The attitude to the different heretic movements like Bogomilism, Barlaamism or Adamism is very hostile which mirrored the official position of the Tarnovo Patriarchate.

The secular literature include a short stories, novels, novelettes, poetry and chronicles. According to the type of stories the novelettes can be divided into three main parts: antique ("Alexandria", "Troyanska pritcha" (Trojan legend) and others, which depicting scenes from the history of ancient Greece), Eastern novelettes ("Varlaam and Yoasaf", "Akir Premadry" - texts from the Indian and Assyrian-Babylonian literature) and medieval ("Teophana - The proprietress" and events in the history of Bulgaria and Byzantium). The novels are very diverse, but also can be divided into three groups: the chronicles (stories about historical events), patherical texts (short stories with one story) and ancient - folklore ("Tales of Aesop", "By the Origin of Samodivas" with themes from Bulgarian mythology and ancient history).

Stories for movement of saints' relics were very wide spread, but there is no agreement whether these stories can be considered for sequels of the passionals or a separate genre. Along with the consolidation of the miraculous properties of the relics, the authors praised the rulers who took care of their movement and safe-keeping which always contain short but valuable historical information.

== Representatives ==
The main representatives of the Tarnovo Literary School include:

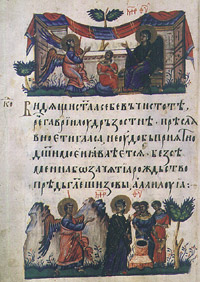
A page of the Tomić Psalter produced around 1360.

- Evtimiy of Tarnovo – a disciple of Theodosius of Tarnovo. He was a creator and head of the Tarnovo Literary School, as well as a teacher. He was author of passionals, praising epistles, breves and others. Except for his reform, Evtimiy introduced a new genre in the Orthodox literature which included features of both passionals and praising epistles.
- Grigoriy Dobropisets – a disciple of Theodosius of Tarnovo, author of the passional of the Bulgarian saint Romil of Vidin.
- Dionisiy Divniy – a disciple of Theodosius of Tarnovo. He was famous for translating books from Greek to Bulgarian and thus won his nickname Divni, meaning marvelous.
- Cyprian – a disciple of Theodosius of Tarnovo. Author of passionals, hymns and other works and translator.
- Gregory Tsamblak – a disciple of Evtimiy. With his work in Visoki Dečani, Moldavia and the Russian principalities, he spread the ideas of his teacher and the influence of the Tarnovo Literary School. He was author of numerous works including Praising epistle for Evtimiy which contains valuable data for the Patriarch and the Bulgarian history and Book of Gregory Tsamblak which is the only collection with works of a Slavic writer from that time.
- Constantine of Kostenets – a disciple of Andrey who was a direct follower of Evtimiy. He lived and worked in the court of the Serbian despot Stefan Lazarević. He established in the Pomoravie region the Resava Literary School.
- Joasaph of Bdin – the teacher of the bishop of Vidin was unknown but his work Praising epistle for the movement of St Philotea relics from Tarnovo to Vidin contained all features of the Tarnovo Literary School. The author demonstrated great respect to Evtimiy of Tarnovo.
- Vladislav the Grammarian – a late representative. He was a translator, compilator, transcriber and calligrapher. His only known author work is Rila novellete which is a sequel to Passional of St John of Rila by Evtimiy. The work contains important date for the reestablishment of the Rila Monastery in the second half of the 15th century and the transfer of the relics of St John of Rila in the monastery in 1469.
- Dimitar Kantakuzin – a late representative. He was a descendant of the Kantakouzenos family. He wrote in Bulgarian and Greek language. Kantakuzin was author of many works such as Passional and short praising of John of Rila, Geographic description, Epistle to domestikos Isay, poetic works with Christian theme.

== See also ==
- Art School of Tarnovo
- Architecture of the Tarnovo Artistic School
- Painting of the Tarnovo Artistic School
- History of Bulgaria
- Second Bulgarian Empire
- Preslav Literary School
- Ohrid Literary School
- Patriarch Evtimiy
- Pliska–Preslav culture
- Cyrillic script
- Medieval Bulgarian literature
- Golden Age of medieval Bulgarian culture
- Third Rome

== Sources ==
- „Страници из историята на Търновската книжовна школа“, Георги Данчев, издателство „Наука и изкуство“, София, 1983 г.
- „Григорий Цамблак“, Константин Мечев, издателство „Наука и изкуство“, София, 1969 г.
- "Старобългарска литература", БАН, София, 1971
