= Kera Tamara =

Princess of Bulgaria (c. 1340 – c. 1389)

- Princess of Bulgaria
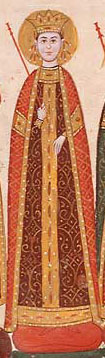
- Manuscript miniature of Kera Tamara (Tetraevangelia of Ivan Alexander).
- Born: c. 1340; Second Bulgarian Empire
- Died: c. 1389 (aged 48-49); Ottoman Empire
- Burial: Bursa
- Spouse: Despot Constantine (m. ? - dead before 1370) Murad I (m. 1378)
- House: Sratsimir
- Father: Ivan Alexander
- Mother: Sarah-Theodora

Kera Tamara (Bulgarian: Кера Тамара; c. 1340 - c. 1389, known also as Tamara Hatun) was a Bulgarian princess, the daughter of the Bulgarian Emperor Ivan Alexander and his second wife Sarah-Theodora, and the legal wife of the Ottoman Sultan Murad I.

== Life ==
Kera Tamara was a sister of Ivan Shishman and Ivan Sratsimir. She was born probably around 1340 and originates from the Sratsimir dynasty.

The first husband of Kera Tamara was despot Constantine. According to one theory he was the despot of Velbazhd Constantine Dragash whose daughter Helena Dragash married the Byzantine Emperor Manuel II and became mother of the last Byzantine Emperor Constantine XI. However, that theory has been dismissed by the historians because in 1371 Kera Tamara was already a widow while Constantine Dragash died in 1395. Therefore, despot Constantine who was depicted in the Tetraevangelia of Ivan Alexander next to the Bulgarian princess was another man.

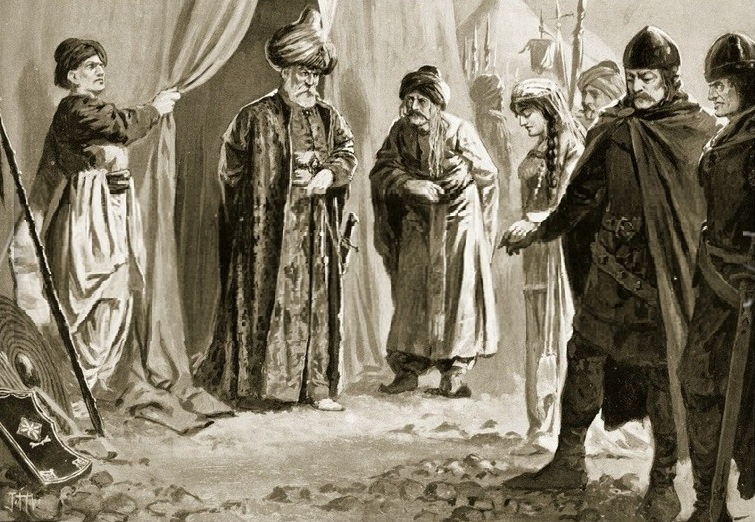
Tsar Shishman delivers up his sister to sultan Murad I

As early as 1371 when Ivan Alexander died and Ivan Shishman inherited the throne, in the capital Tarnovo arrived ambassadors from the Ottoman Sultan Murad I to arrange. Bulgarian Emperor Ivan Shishman married his sister, Kera Tamara, to Sultan Murad I in order to secure his throne and guarantee peace between the two countries. Ivan Shishman managed to divert his demand and prolonged his decision for seven years. On that occasion an anonymous Bulgarian chronicle from the 15th century records:

...And on the throne came Shishman, son of Alexander. Amorat [Murad] sent to him men to ask for his sister, but he did not want to give his sister, Tsarina Kera Tamara...

However, in 1378 when his attempts to stop the Turks failed, Ivan Shishman reluctantly sent Kera Tamara in the harem of the Sultan in the Ottoman capital Bursa. She had no known children. She kept her Christian faith. In the Boril Synadnik her fate was praised as a self-sacrifice:

...For Kera Tamara, daughter of the great Emperor Ivan Alexander, great princess, wife of the great emir Amurat, to whom she was given for the sake of the Bulgarian people. And she, when she arrived there, kept her True faith, freed her people, lived well and pious and died in peace, may her memory live forever...

The grave of Kera Tamara remains today in Bursa in the family tomb of the Ottoman dynasty next to the grave of Murad I and the visitor know it as the place of "the Bulgarian Empress Maria". According to Kera Tamara's will, her tomb remained uncovered and barley was sowed on her grave.

== Sources ==
- Queens of Tarnovo, Plamen Pavlov, 2006
