= Șoimoș =

Șoimoș Solymos-patak
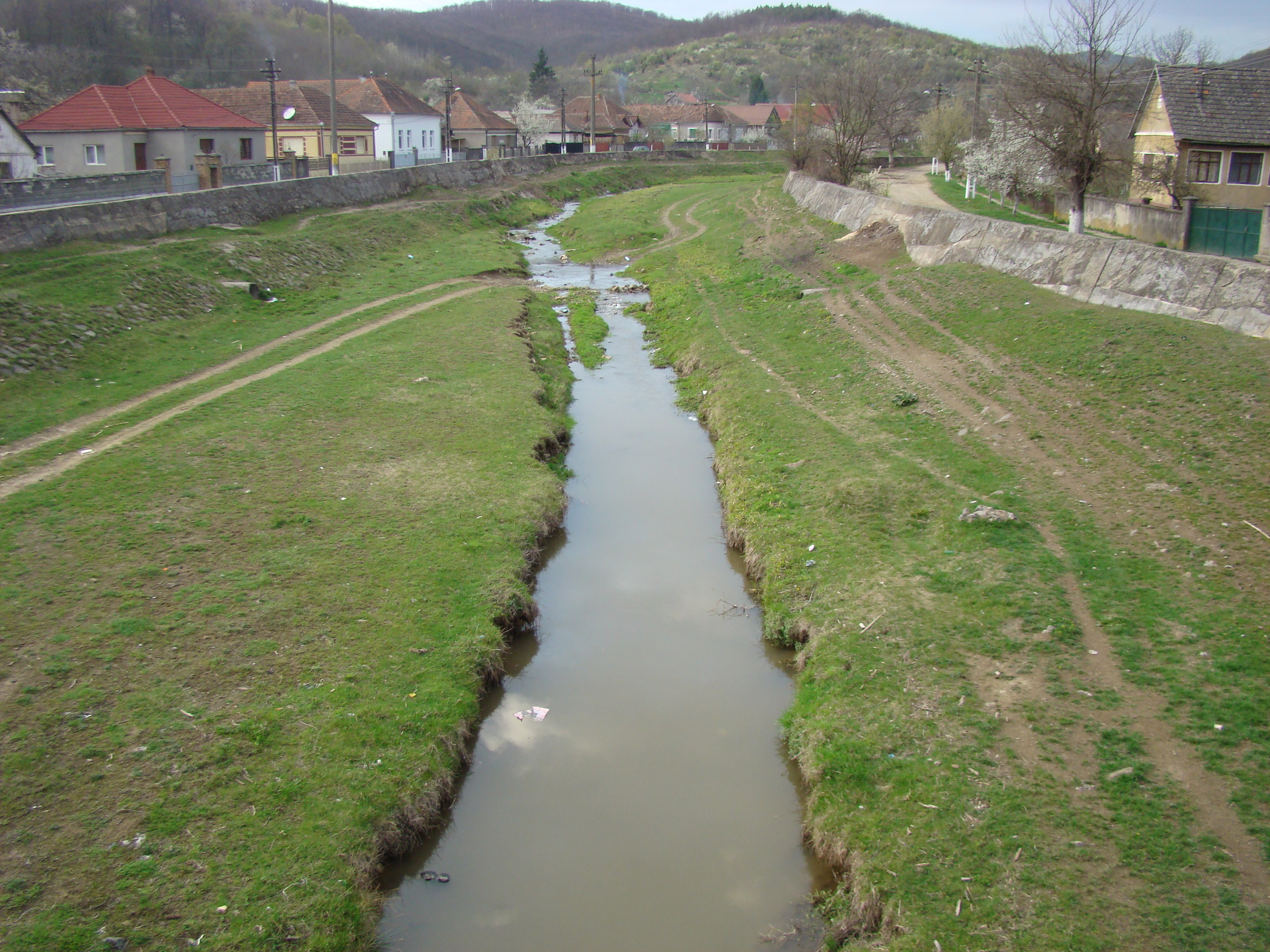

- Location within Romania

Location
- Country: Romania
- Counties: Arad County
- Villages: Șoimoș

Physical characteristics
- Mouth: Mureș
  - location: Șoimoș
  - coordinates: 46.1034°N 21.7193°E
- Length: 11 km (6.8 mi)
- Basin size: 22 km^{2} (8.5 sq mi)

Basin features
- Progression: Mureș→ Tisza→ Danube→ Black Sea

The Șoimoș (Hungarian: Solymos-patak) is a right tributary of the river Mureș in Romania. It discharges into the Mureș in the village Șoimoș. Its length is 11 km (6.8 mi) and its basin size is 22 km^{2} (8.5 sq mi). The Hungarian name means "Hawkish Creek". The Romanian name derives from that.
