= Alexander (son of Ivan Shishman) =

Bulgarian prince (died 1418)

Alexander (Bulgarian: Александър), subsequently Iskender (Ottoman Turkish: اسكندر) (died 1418), was the eldest son of Bulgarian tsar Ivan Shishman (r. 1371–1395). Alexander was possibly made co-emperor by his father before the Ottoman conquest of the Tarnovo Tsardom in 1395. After the subjugation of Ivan Shishman's realm and his execution, Alexander converted to Islam to avoid his father's fate. He was made governor of Samsun, where he remained until 1402. From 1413 to 1418, when he was killed in a battle against a local rebel, Alexander was in charge of Smyrna (İzmir).

== Biography ==
There is no information about Alexander's early life in the contemporary sources. Indeed, the only hint as to his existence in a Bulgarian source is an anonymous reference in Ephraim's Prayer Canon to the Tsar, where he is only mentioned as “the son of the tsar”. It is uncertain whether Alexander was born to Ivan Shishman's first wife, Kira Maria, or to his second wife, a daughter of Prince Lazar of Serbia (r. 1371–1389).

Due to Alexander's first-born status, Bulgarian historian Petar Nikov conjectures that at some point before 1395, Alexander was made co-ruler by his father Ivan Shishman. This would have been in line with a custom that dates to the reign of Ivan Alexander (r. 1331–1371), Ivan Shishman's own father. Alexander had a younger brother, Fruzhin, who, in contrast to Alexander, was a staunch opponent of the Ottomans and a Hungarian subject. In addition to Fruzhin, Alexander had other brothers and sisters, of whom practically nothing is known.

The Fall of Tarnovo in 1393 and the subsequent subjugation of the entire Tarnovo Tsardom in 1395 resulted in the execution of Ivan Shishman by Sultan Bayezid I (r. 1389–1402). Though his successor Alexander was spared by the Ottomans, he was forced into accepting Islam and was exiled to Asia Minor so as to keep him far from his father's previous domains. Alexander, subsequently referred to as Iskender in Ottoman sources, was installed as governor of Samsun and the neighbouring territories (“the land of Canik”). These lands lay along the southern Black Sea coast, between Sinope and Trebizond, and had been recently conquered by Bayezid. Alexander possibly remained governor of Samsun until 1402, when this region was conquered by the Timurids in the wake of the Battle of Ankara on 20 July of that year. After the Timurid victory, the Samsun region came under the rule of the Seljuk prince İsfendiyar.

Alexander's subsequent fate is unknown until the end of the Ottoman Interregnum in 1413, when Mehmed I (r. 1413–1421) had established himself as ruler of the Ottoman Empire and had retaken the region of Smyrna on the eastern Aegean coast. Until then, Smyrna had been ruled by Cüneyt, the bey of Aydin, who was exiled as governor of the previously Bulgarian city of Nikopol on the Danube. Alexander was installed as the ruler of Smyrna in Cüneyt's place. He remained in charge of the city until 1418, when he attempted to suppress a rebellion to the south of Smyrna headed by Sheikh Bedrettin's follower Börklüce Mustafa. However, Alexander's forces proved insufficient for the purpose. His army was ambushed in a mountain gorge and suffered a great defeat, during which Alexander was killed.

According to the theory of Bulgarian historian Plamen Pavlov, during his time as governor of Smyrna, Alexander may have been in active contact with his possible half-brother, the future Patriarch Joseph II of Constantinople. From 1393 to 1416, Joseph was the metropolitan bishop of Ephesus, another city on the eastern Aegean coast located not far from Smyrna. Pavlov conjectures that Joseph's selection as patriarch may have been influenced by his ties to Mehmed I via Alexander. In Pavlov's opinion, it is also possible that titular Bulgarian tsar Constantine II's support for Mehmed was in some way related to his relative Alexander's position as an Ottoman governor.

== Sources ==
- Андреев, Йордан; Лазаров, Иван; Павлов, Пламен (1999). Кой кой е в средновековна България [Who is Who in Medieval Bulgaria] (in Bulgarian). Петър Берон. ISBN 978-954-402-047-7.
- Бакалов, Георги (2003). История на българите: В 8 тома. Късно средновековие и Възраждане [History of the Bulgarians: In 8 Volumes. Late Middle Ages and National Revival] (in Bulgarian). София: Труд. ISBN 978-954-528-467-0.
- Божилов, Иван (1994). Фамилията на Асеневци (1186–1460). Генеалогия и просопография [The Family of the Asens (1186–1460). Genealogy and Prosopography] (in Bulgarian). София: Издателство на Българската академия на науките. ISBN 954-430-264-6.
- Павлов, Пламен (2008). Българското средновековие. Познато и непознато [The Bulgarian Middle Ages. Familiar and Unknown] (in Bulgarian). Велико Търново: Абагар. ISBN 978-954-427-796-3.
