= Siege of Tarnovo =

1393 capture of the Bulgarian city of Tarnovo by the Ottoman Empire

Coordinates: 43°05′N 25°39′E

Siege of Tarnovgrad
- Part of the Bulgarian–Ottoman wars
| Date | April – 17 July 1393 (3 months) |
| Location | Tarnovo, Bulgaria |
| Result | Ottoman victory |
| Territorial changes | Tarnovo annexed by the Ottomans |

Belligerents
| (Second Bulgarian Empire) Bulgarian Empire | Ottoman Empire |

Commanders and leaders
| (Second Bulgarian Empire) Euthymios | (Ottoman Empire) Bayezid I (Ottoman Empire) Süleyman Çelebi (Ottoman Empire) İsa Çelebi (Ottoman Empire) Mustafa Çelebi (Ottoman Empire) Mehmed Çelebi (Ottoman Empire) Musa Çelebi |

The siege of Tarnovgrad occurred in the spring of 1393 and resulted in a decisive Ottoman victory. With the fall of its capital, the Bulgarian Empire was reduced to a few fortresses along the Danube.

== The battle ==
In the spring of 1393, Bayazid I gathered his troops from Asia Minor, crossed the Dardanelles, and joined his western army, which likely included some Christian rulers from Macedonia. He entrusted the main command to his son Celebi, and ordered him to depart for Tarnovo. Suddenly, the town was besieged from all sides. The Turks threatened the citizens with fire and death if they did not surrender.

The great siege lasted for about three months, following an attack from the direction of Tsarevets, on July 17, 1393, the fortress fell to the Ottomans. The Patriarch's church "Ascension of Christ" was turned into a mosque, the rest of the churches were also turned into mosques, baths, or stables. All palaces and churches of Trapezitsa were burned down and destroyed. The same fate was expected for the tzar palaces of Tsarevets; however, parts of their walls and towers were left standing until the 17th century.

In the absence of Tsar Ivan Shishman, who was with the remnants of his troops in the fortress of Nikopol, the main Bulgarian leader in the town was Patriarch Evtimiy. He went to the Turkish camp with the intention of assuaging the Turkish commander, who listened politely to his pleas, but afterwards fulfilled very little of his promises. After a fierce battle, the town was captured by the Turks under Celebi.

Celebi left the town after appointing a local commander. The new governor gathered all eminent citizens and boyars under a pretense and had them all killed. According to legend, Evtimiy was sentenced to death but saved at the last minute by a miracle. It is said that Evtimiy was sentenced to beheading but as the executioner raised the sword, his hands were miraculously paralysed, and the blade fell to the ground. After leaving behind a Turkish commander to govern the town, Celebi left and joined up his army with the main army led by his father Bayazid I and they went on to capture the fortress of Nikopol. This rapid success by the Turks led a great deal of panic throughout the rest of Europe and the Pope called for a Crusade. This Crusade would be fought at Nikopol three years later in the Battle of Nicopolis.
