= Gospels of Tsar Ivan Alexander =

14th-century manuscript of the Gospels

A miniature from the Tetraevangelia depicting the tsar and the royal family

The Gospels of Tsar Ivan Alexander, Tetraevangelia of Ivan Alexander, or Four Gospels of Ivan Alexander (Bulgarian: Четвероевангелие на (цар) Иван Александър, transliterated as Chetveroevangelie na (tsar) Ivan Aleksandar) is an illuminated manuscript Gospel Book, written and illustrated in 1355–1356 for Tsar Ivan Alexander of the Second Bulgarian Empire. The manuscript is regarded as one of the most important manuscripts of medieval Bulgarian culture, and has been described as "the most celebrated work of art produced in Bulgaria before it fell to the Turks in 1393".

The manuscript, now in the British Library (Add. MS 39627), contains the text of the Four Gospels illustrated with 366 miniatures and consists of 286 parchment folios, 33 by 24.3 cm in size, later paginated with pencil. The language of the text is variously described as Bulgarian, Middle Bulgarian, Slavonic, and Church Slavonic.

== Contents and binding ==
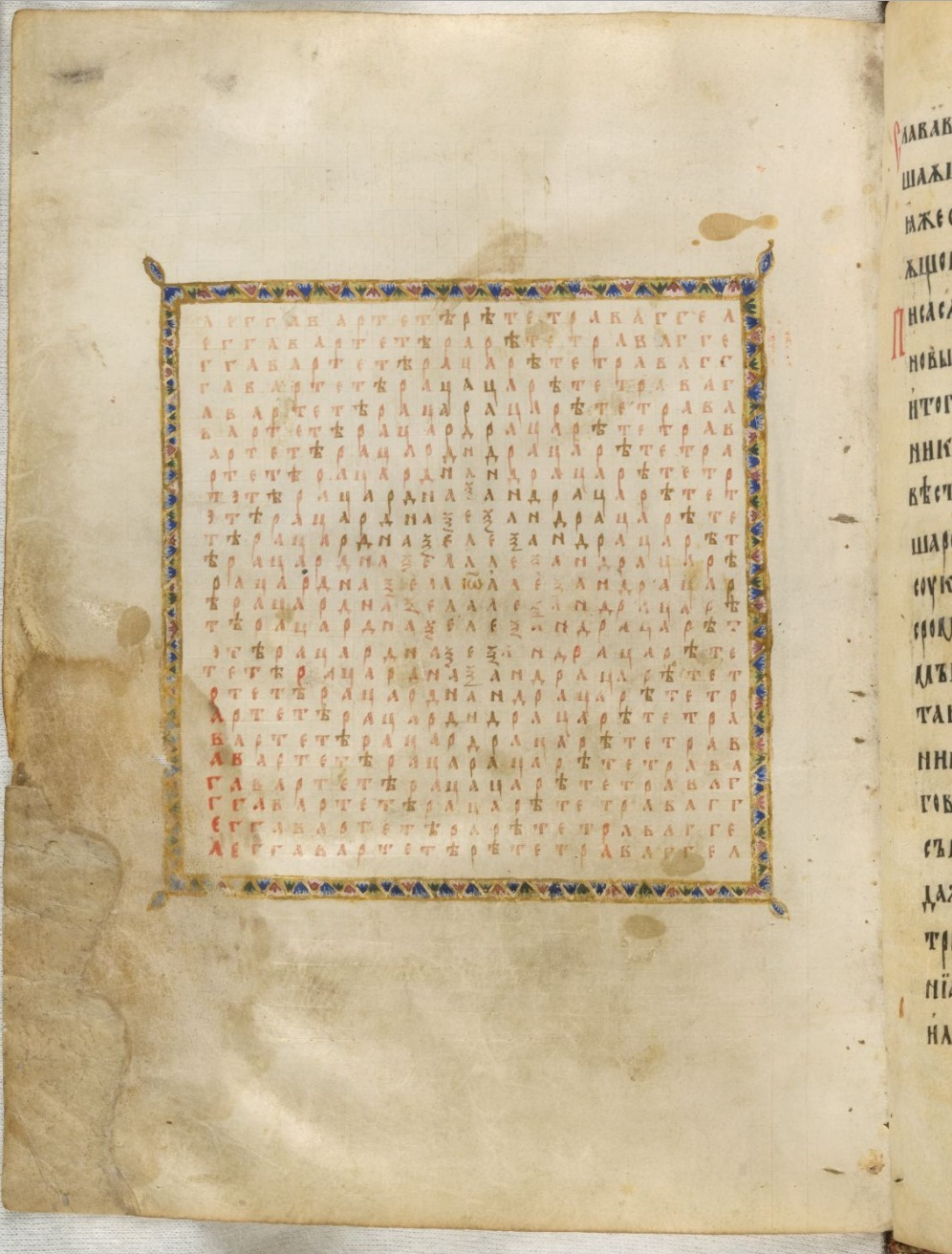
The magic square on f.273v

The book contains the four Gospels and some other texts, so is a true gospel book rather than an evangeliary, but there are markings showing which passages were to be read in the liturgy, as well as a list at the end of the book. The bookbinding of red leather over wooden boards is original, but the elements of a metalwork treasure binding, probably decorated with gold, gems and pearls on top of this, have disappeared. The nail holes where these were fixed on are evident, but it would not have covered all the binding, even on the front, as the leather is stamped with patterns and a griffin.

The last gathering, with ff. 276–284, is a later insertion with a smaller page size, containing a menology or liturgical calendar of feast days and the appropriate gospel readings for them, and a synaxaria or calendar listing saints' feast days. There is also a short guide on studying the scriptures. Before this, at the end of the original book on f. 273v, is a magic square of a grid with 625 squares containing letters, in which the name of the book, as "Io Alexander Tsarya Tetravaggel" is spelled out several times, a unique feature in such a manuscript. The centre square contains the "Iῶ" from which all readings begin. Folio 74, which probably contained a miniature illustrating the Last Judgment, has been cut and stolen in modern times.

== Miniatures ==
The gospels are very heavily illuminated by the standards of the West European Late Middle Ages, following Byzantine traditions, going back to Early Byzantine luxury manuscripts of the scriptures such as the Vienna Genesis. Most pages have small "frieze" images in a landscape format taking the width of the written page. These are interspersed in the text, with between none and three per page, the number and placement in the text depending on the story at that particular point. Other images are near-squares, with the text wrapping round them, and there are larger or whole page miniatures at a few key points.

Several scenes are shown more than once as they appear in the different gospels. Many images contain more than one scene side by side, or sometimes one above the other. The images probably follow closely a lost Greek model, perhaps of the 11th or 12th century. The miniatures are mostly very close to those in a Greek manuscript made in the 11th century in the Monastery of Stoudios, the largest in Constantinople (now in Paris as BnF, cod grec 74), and were probably very largely copied from this or another Byzantine exemplar in the same tradition.

The colophon, unusually, refers to but does not name the artists (in the plural) who worked on the book. The hands of three main masters can be detected, as well as other less competent stretches which were probably the work of less experienced trainees. All would probably have been monks. The main master, responsible for the royal portrait and other major scenes on a larger scale, has been claimed to be very innovative in his technique, while a second master partly followed his style, and the third was more conservative. However non-Bulgarian historians regard the style as a somewhat conservative one which "adhered closely to Byzantine models". According to Robin Milner-Gulland, "All the painters use saturated colours, relish picturesque details and confidently handle a linear, basically twelfth-century Byzantine manner that is distinctly archaic by the standards of the fourteenth century."

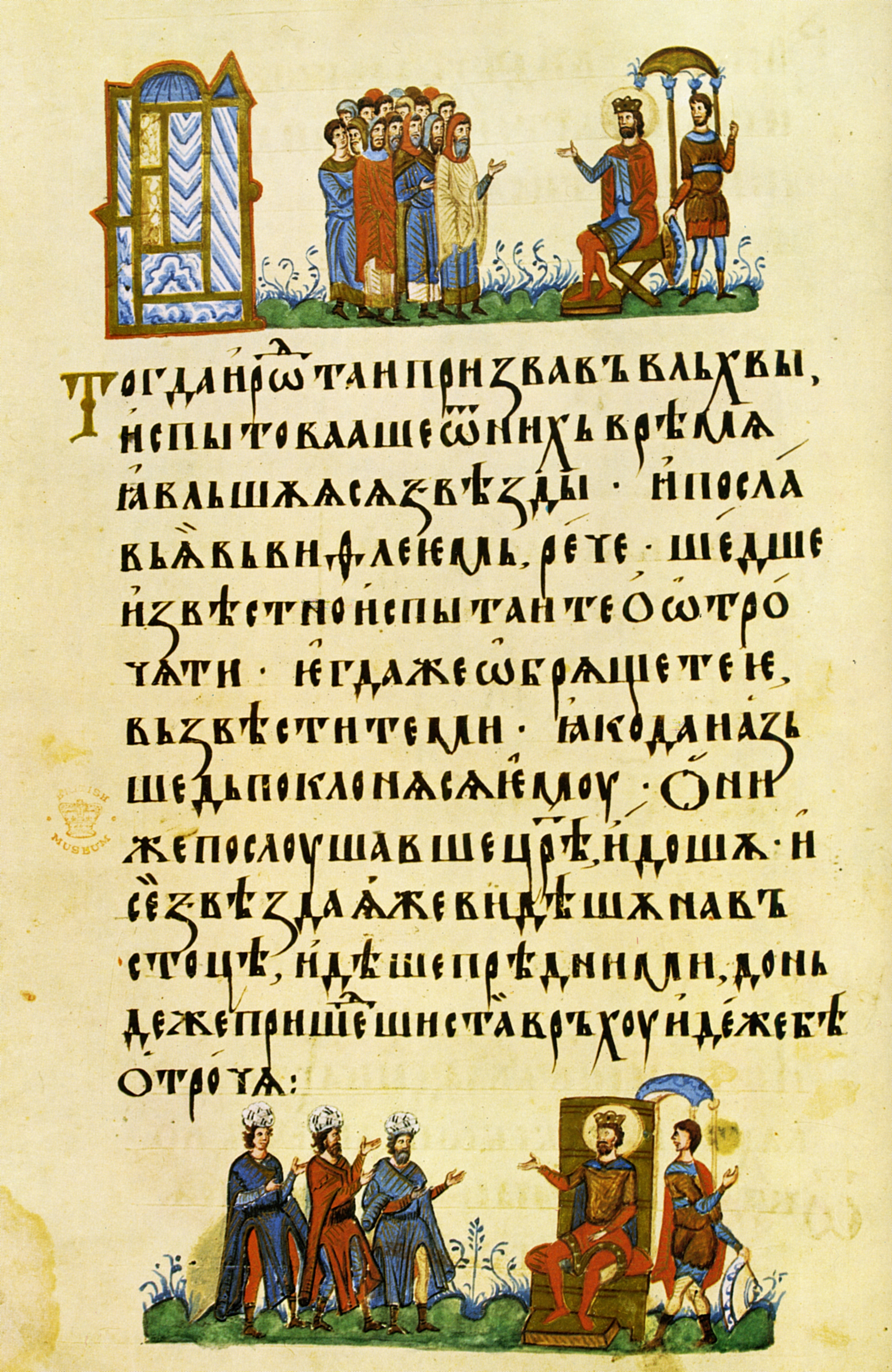
Folio 9; Matthew 2:7-9, Herod takes advice, and calls the Three Magi to him

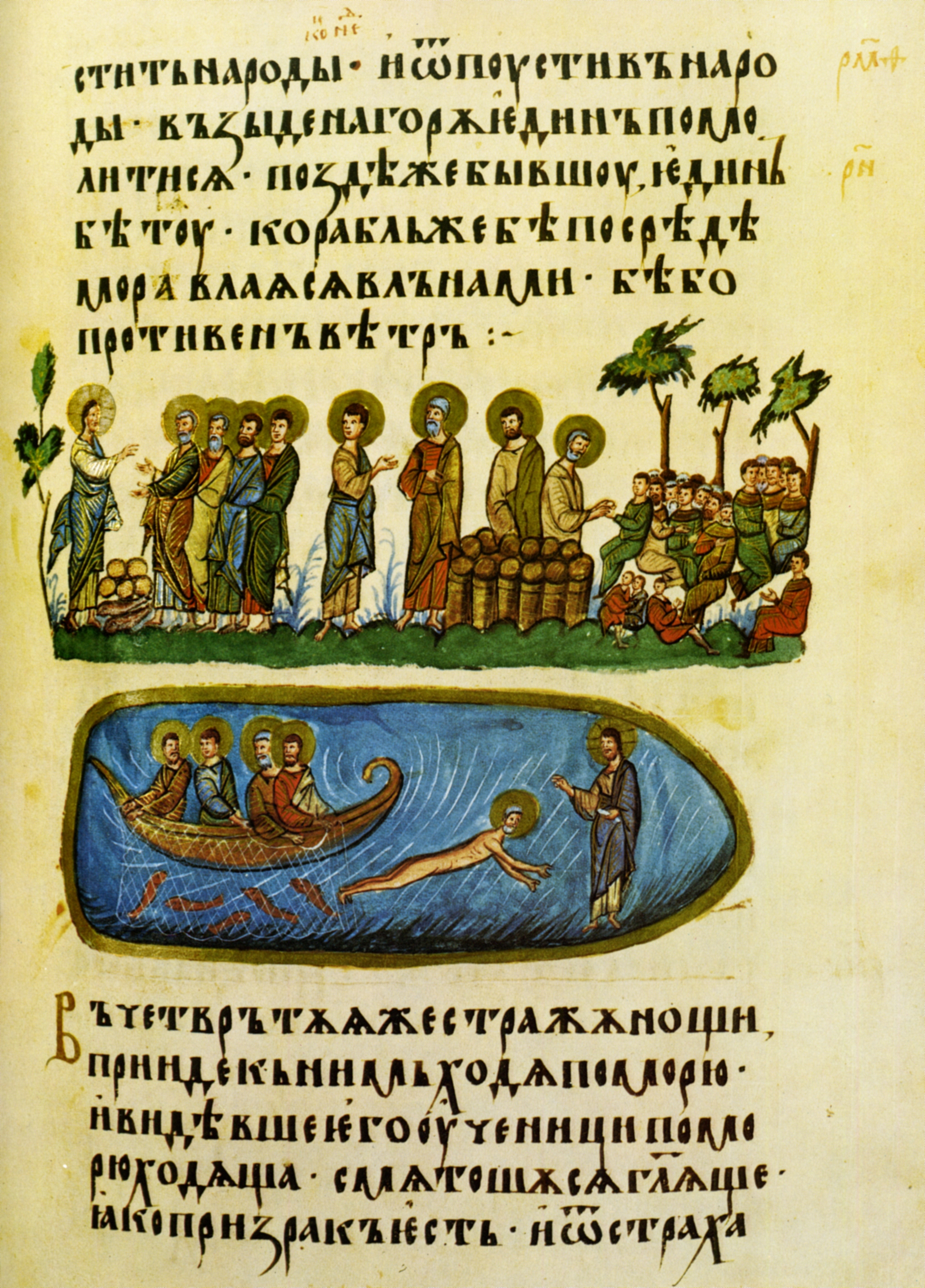
Folio 45; Matthew 14:22-26, the Feeding of the Five Thousand and Second miraculous catch of fish

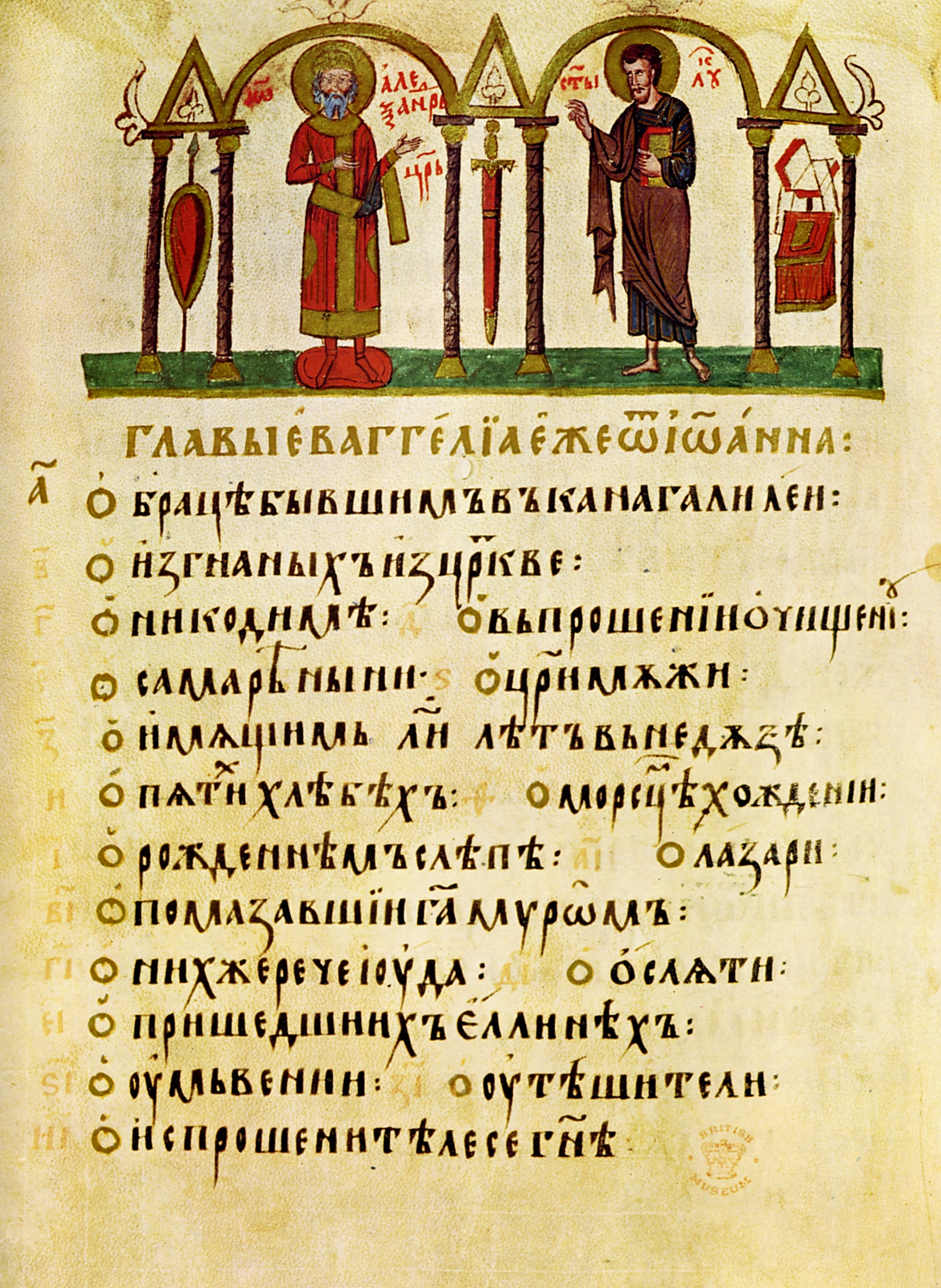
Folio 212v; summary of the chapters of John, with the Tsar and the (barefoot) evangelist

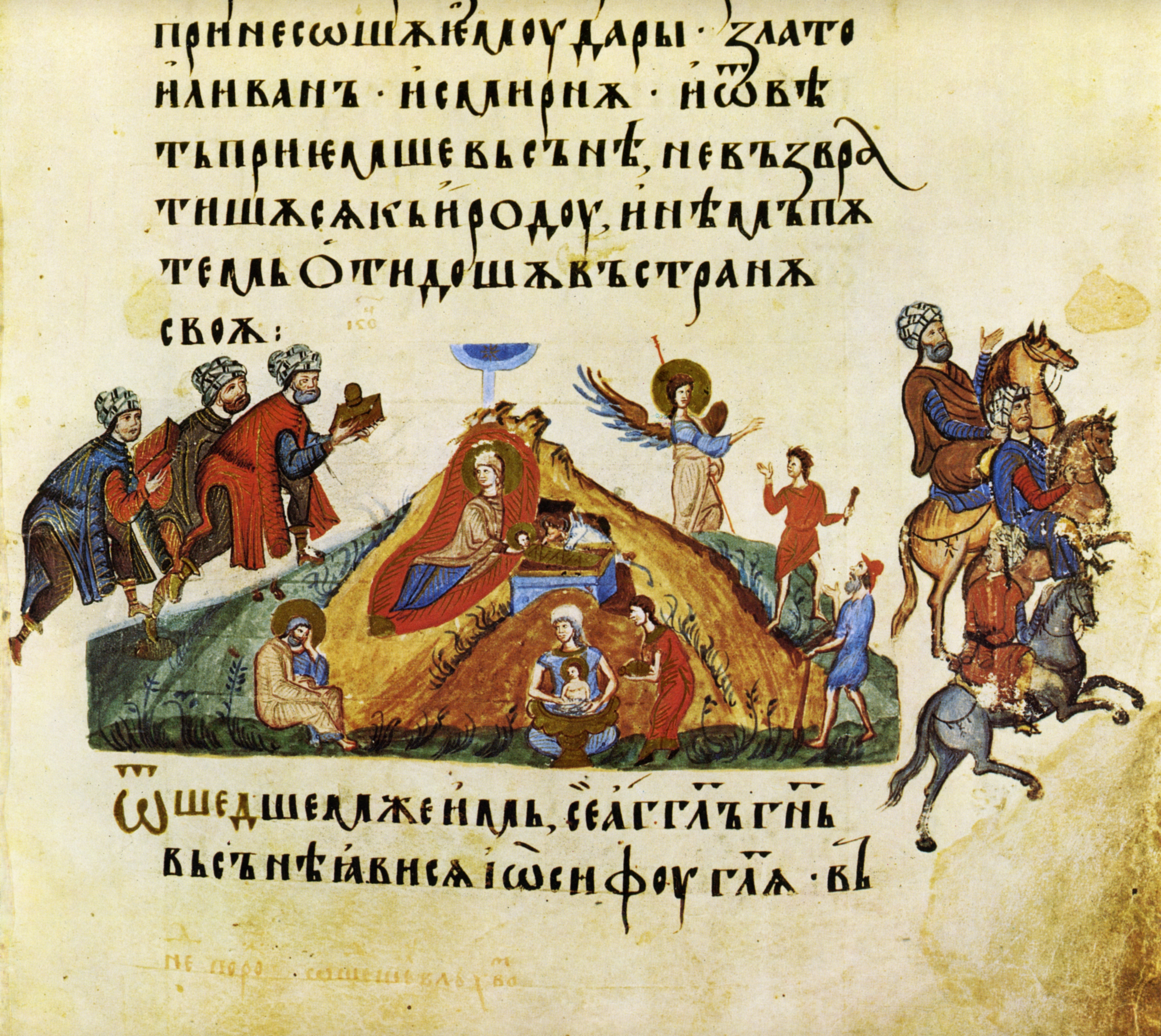
Folio 10, detail - Nativity, with the Magi appearing twice

=== The royal portraits ===
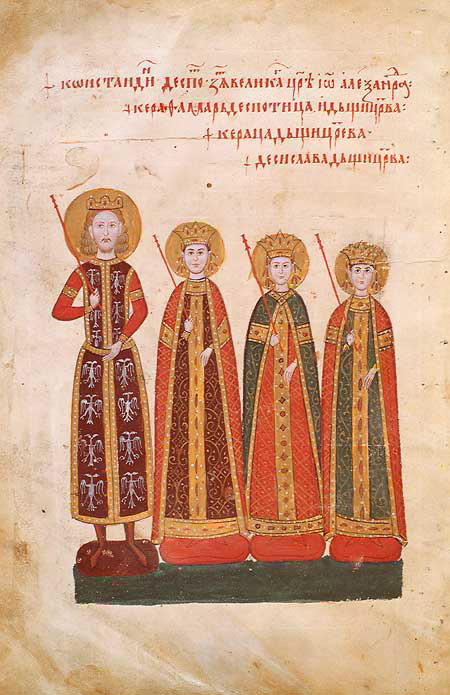
Folio 2v, with the tsar's son-in-law and daughters

Folios 2v and 3r include a double spread miniature of the Tsar, his second wife, and his five children from both marriages, with his son-in-law on the far left, all identified by inscriptions. Each member of the family is depicted as wearing crowns with halos, and carrying sceptres. Above the Tsar and his wife there is a double Hand of God. The tsar and his eldest son, standing to the left of him, wear a form of loros, a cloth strip embroidered with gold thread and studded with gems that was an important part of the imperial insignia of Byzantine emperors. The face of the tsar is carefully painted and attempts a realistic likeness. These conventions follow imperial portraits of Orthodox Rulers from the previous century, such those of Serbia, Georgia and the Armenian Kingdom of Cilicia.

There are a number of other portraits of the tsar; at the end of each gospel he is shown at small size in an arcade with the evangelist, and he appears in a large scene of the Last Judgement. In the Paris Greek gospel book with similar images, the equivalent images at the end of each gospel show the evangelist with the abbot.

== History ==
The text of the manuscript was all written by a monk named Simeon in 1355–1356 on the orders of Ivan Alexander, probably for use in his private chapel. Simeon gives his name in the colophon on f. 275. It is not certain whether Simeon also illuminated the Tetraevangelia or simply was a scribe and calligrapher, or indeed whether he devised the magic square. Probably at least three different artists worked on the miniatures, but as was usual no names are given. The handwriting of the manuscript shows definite similarity with that of the Manasses Chronicle (1344–1345), a product of the Tarnovo Literary School of the time.

After the fall of Tarnovo to the Ottomans in 1393, the manuscript was transported to Moldavia possibly by a Bulgarian fugitive, marking the last time for nearly half a millennium it would be in its native Bulgaria. It spent a number of years there and was later bought on the orders and with the resources of Prince Alexander I of Moldavia (also a "John Alexander"), which is evidenced by a red-ink marginal note on folio 5. The later fate of the manuscript until its arrival in monastery of Agiou Pavlou (St Paul) on Mount Athos is uncertain, but the document was recorded as part of the monastery's collection in the 17th century.

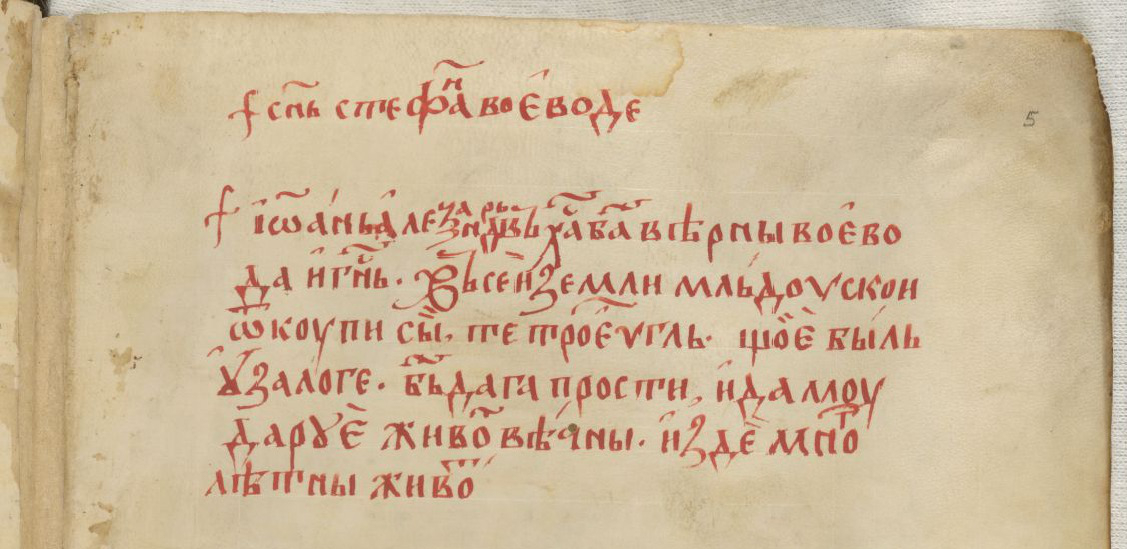
Inscription on f. 5.r., recording the purchase by Prince Alexander in Moldavia

The English traveller and collector Robert Curzon (later 14th Baron Zouche, 1810–1873), who visited the monastery in 1837, was given the Tetraevangelia as a present by the abbot. This was to his surprise and delight, according to his own account; Milner-Gulland describes it as "shamelessly cadged" from the abbot. This probably saved the manuscript from being destroyed by the fire that burnt down the monastery library in 1905. Curzon released an inventory of his collection of manuscripts in 1849, the first time the Tetraevangelia was presented to the academic world. Direct work with the original was, however, impossible, which caused speculation, supposition and rumours related to the manuscript. His son placed his collection on permanent loan in the British Museum in 1876, and after her death, his entire collection was given to the museum in 1917 by his daughter Darea, 16th Baroness Zouche (1860–1917), which enabled more detailed examination of the book. When the British Library was created in 1973, the manuscript was transferred to the British Library.

In 2017 the manuscript has been added to UNESCO's Memory of the World international register as a document of global significance.

== See also ==
- Sofia Psalter, 1337
- Tomić Psalter, c. 1360

== Sources ==
- Dimitrova, Ekaterina, The Gospels of Tsar Ivan Alexander, 1994, British Library, ISBN 0712303499
- Evans, Helen C. (ed.), Byzantium, Faith and Power (1261–1557), # 27, 2004, Metropolitan Museum of Art/Yale University Press, ISBN 1588391140, Fully online from the Metropolitan Museum of Art (and see McKendrick)
- McKendrick, Scot, in Evans, Helen C. (ed.), Byzantium, Faith and Power (1261–1557), # 27, 2004, Metropolitan Museum of Art/Yale University Press, ISBN 1588391140, Fully online from the Metropolitan Museum of Art
- Milner-Gulland, R.R. "Review of The Gospels of Tsar Ivan Alexander by Ekaterina Dimitrova", The Slavonic and East European Review, Vol. 74, No. 2 (Apr., 1996), pp. 302–304, Modern Humanities Research Association and University College London, School of Slavonic and East European Studies, JSTOR
- Zhivkova, Lyudmila (1980). Chetveroevangelieto na tsar Ivan Aleksandar (in Bulgarian). Sofia: Nauka i Izkustvo. OCLC 45937154.
- "Gospels of Tsar Ivan Alexander". British Library website. Archived from the original on 2006-02-13.
- British Library Manuscripts Catalogue entry, and fully digitized with 579 images
