= Wallachian campaign (1369) =

1369 Hungarian invasion of Wallachia

- Part of the Hungarian–Wallachian War
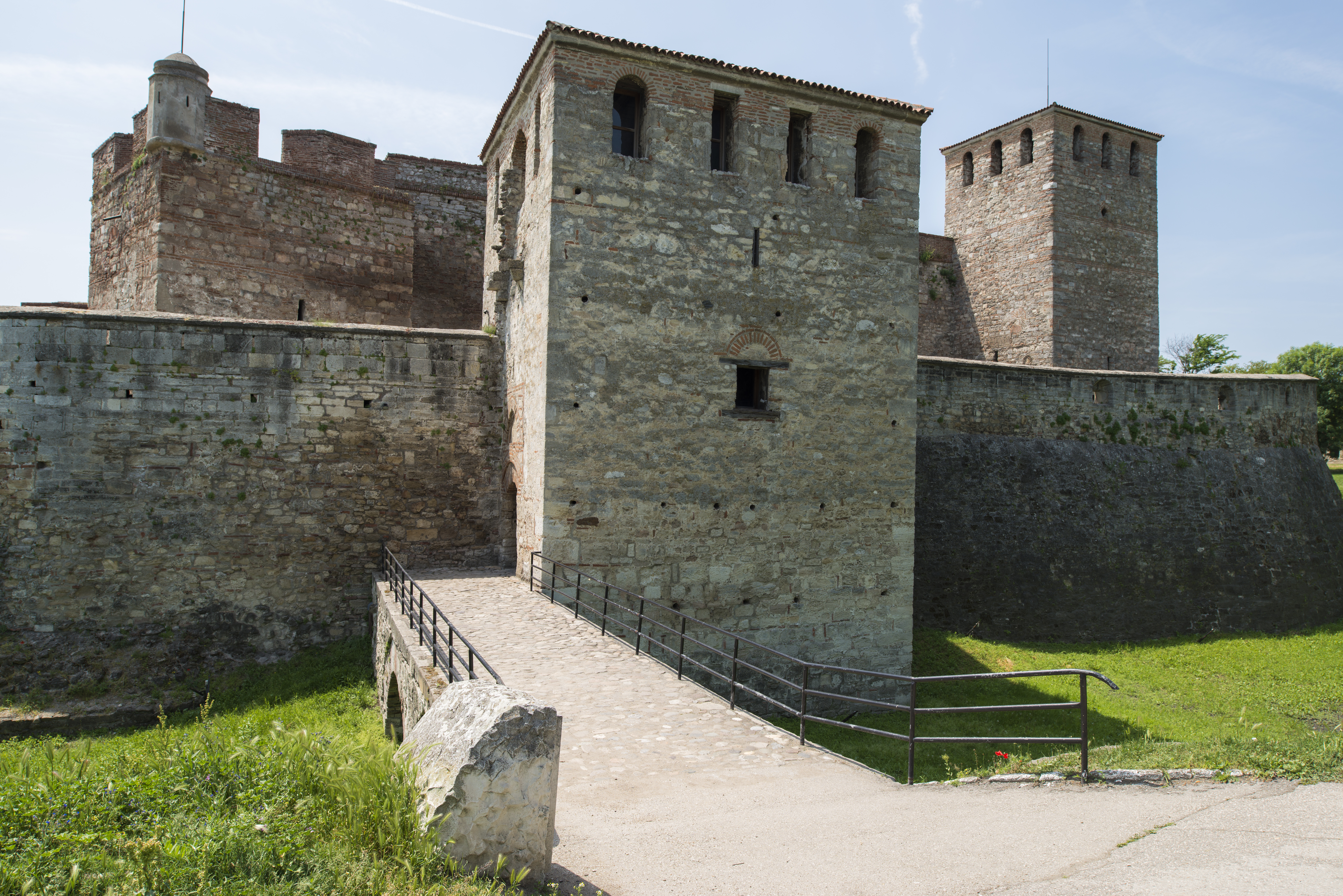
- Baba Vida fortress in Vidin, northwestern Bulgaria
Date	Summer 1369
Location	Wallachia
Result	Hungarian victory
Territorial changes	Hungary re-establishes suzerainty over Wallachia; Ivan Sratsimir restored as Tsar of Vidin under Hungarian suzerainty

Belligerents
Hungary	Wallachia

Commanders and leaders
Louis I	Vladislav I

The Wallachian campaign of 1369 was a military invasion by the Hungarian army of king Louis I with the goal of re-establishing suzerainty over Wallachia ruled by Voivode Vladislav I, as a response to the latter's capture of Vidin. It took place in the summer of 1369.

== Background ==
=== Hungarian occupation of Vidin ===
In 1356, Ivan Sratsimir was proclaimed Tsar of Vidin and shortly after, he secured an alliance with Wallachia by marrying Anna, daughter of Voivode Nicholas Alexander. In 1365, King Louis I of Hungary, styling himself as King of Bulgaria, demanded that Sratsimir recognize his suzerainty and become his vassal. After Sratsimir's refusal, the King of Hungary invaded and captured Vidin, taking the Bulgarian Tsar into captivity and forcing him to convert to Catholicism. The province was turned into a Banate with Denis Lackfi appointed as Ban.

Under the Hungarian occupation, an attempt was made to forcibly convert the population of Vidin to Catholicism through the use of Franciscan friars. Ivan Alexander, the Tsar of Bulgaria and father of Ivan Sratsimir, did not initially attempt to stop the Hungarians. Several years later, he organized an Orthodox coalition to recapture Vidin after the conclusion of the Savoyard crusade on the Bulgarian Black Sea Coast. In this coalition, he enlisted the help of Dobrotitsa, the despot of the Principality of Karvuna, and Voivode Vladislav I Vlaicu of Wallachia, who had previously came under the suzerainty of king Louis I in 1365 following Hungarian military threats. In this sense, Vlaicu supposedly received 180 000 florins from Ivan Alexander and the Byzantine Emperor John V Palaiologos to capture Vidin and cede the city to Ivan Alexander.

Despite the events, relations between Hungary and Wallachia remained good until the summer of 1368, when the king ordered a military campaign against Wallachia to subdue the rebellious Wallachian voivode. In the autumn of that year, an army under the command of Transylvanian voivode Nicholas Lackfi invaded Wallachia. The Transylvanian army was defeated, however, while crossing the valley of the Ialomița River, with the Transylvanian voivode being killed during the Wallachian ambush.

=== Wallachian occupation of Vidin ===
By December, the remnants of the Hungarian army had been dispersed from Wallachia. Following this, the Wallachian army went on the offensive during the winter of 1368–1369. Vidin was captured in early 1369. During the Wallachian occupation, Vladislav allowed the massacre of the Franciscan friars by the Greek missionaries and the locals who had been subjected to abuses by the friars, and perhaps as a response to the earlier campaign launched against him by King Louis.

Vladislav continued to rule Vidin until August 1369, when the Hungarians to launched another campaign into Wallachia.

== Campaign ==
In the summer of 1369, the Hungarian king attacked Wallachia from two directions. Louis I personally led the Hungarian army from the direction of Bulgaria, where they confronted by Wallachian archers. However, the Wallachians were defeated in this confrontation. As a result, the Hungarian army was able to enter Banate of Severin and occupy Szörény castle. The victories of the Hungarian forces ended the Wallachian control over Vidin and brought Vladislav to negotiations.

== Aftermath ==
In the aftermath of the Hungarian campaign, Vladislav agreed to return Wallachia under the Hungarian suzerainty. In return, King Louis renounced his claims over Vidin and reappointed Ivan Sratismir as Tsar under Hungarian vassalage in the autumn of 1369. The king of Hungary also appointed Vladislav as a ruler of Țara Făgărașului and Severin. Shortly after Sratismir was restored as Tsar of Vidin, Tsar Ivan Alexander attempted to seize the city for himself using Ottoman support. The Bulgarian-Ottoman army was defeated by Vladislav Vlaicu in November–December 1369. Two years later, in February–March 1371, Vladislav also participated in a crusade launched by King Louis and Ivan Sratismir against the Ottomans and the new Tsar of Tarnovo, Ivan Shishman. The result was the capture of Sofia.

Conflicts between Wallachia and Hungary would later resurface in 1374 due to religious tensions and rumors that Vladislav had occupied Nicopolis. A new campaign was launched by the Hungarians, which ended in the occupation of Severin in 1375. The Wallachians recaptured it in early 1377, and the war continued under the new voivode, Radu I until the winter of 1377–1378. Relations between the two countries were normalized by 1382.
