= Dorothea of Bulgaria =

Queen of Bosnia (died 1390)

Queen consort of Bosnia
- Tenure: 1377 – c. 1390
- Died: c. 1390
- Spouse: Tvrtko I of Bosnia
- House: Sratsimir
- Father: Ivan Sratsimir of Bulgaria
- Mother: Anna of Wallachia

Dorothea of Bulgaria (Bulgarian: Доротея, Serbo-Croatian: Doroteja, Доротеја; died c. 1390), also called Doroslava (Cyrillic: Дорослава), was the first Queen of Bosnia. Daughter of the Bulgarian tsar Ivan Sratsimir, Dorothea was held hostage by King Louis I of Hungary, who married her off to Ban Tvrtko I of Bosnia in 1374. She became queen in 1377 and may have been the mother of King Tvrtko II.

== Captivity ==
Dorothea was the daughter of Ivan Sratsimir, Tsar of Bulgaria. Her mother was Ivan Sratsimir's first cousin and second wife, Anna of Wallachia, the daughter of the Wallachian voivode Nicholas Alexander Basarab. She is the sister of Constantine II Asen, the last ruler of the Tsardom of Vidin. On her father's side she belongs to the Bulgarian royal dynasty Shishman and is the granddaughter of Tsar John Alexander. On her mother's side she belongs to the Wallachian dynasty Basarab. She is the niece of the Wallachian voivodes John Radul I and John Vladislav I and a cousin of Dan I and Mircea the Old.

Dorothea was captured along with her parents and sister in 1365 by the army of King Louis I of Hungary following his conquest of Ivan Sratsimir's capital city, Vidin. The family was held captive in Humnik Fortress in Bosiljevo, Croatia. They spent four years in the fortress, and were forced to convert from Bulgarian Orthodoxy to Roman Catholicism.

Ivan Sratsimir was released and restored as Louis's vassal in 1369, but Louis retained Dorothea and her sister at the Hungarian court as honored hostages to ensure their father's loyalty. Dorothea was placed in care of the queen, Elizabeth of Bosnia, and queen mother, Elizabeth of Poland. According to Mavro Orbini, Dorothea was a lady-in-waiting to the Hungarian queen. While her sister died in childhood, Dorothea fell in favour of the King.

== Queenship ==
Ban Tvrtko I of Bosnia, another vassal of King Louis, probably first heard about Dorothea during her captivity in Croatia. Louis eventually suggested that Tvrtko marry her. The negotiations were carried out by Louis on Dorothea's behalf. The marriage that made Dorothea Banness of Bosnia was celebrated in Hungarian-held Syrmia in early December 1374, either in Đakovo or in Ilinci; the wedding festivities doubtlessly took place in Ilinci.

In October 1377, Tvrtko was crowned King of Bosnia and Dorothea became the country's first queen. As such, Dorothea was consulted in state affairs. She witnessed her husband's charters and took oaths to respect them, initially alongside her mother-in-law, Jelena Šubić. Queen Dorothea is mentioned in a 1382 charter to the Republic of Ragusa alongside the King and the King's son, presumably her son too. This child may have been the future King Tvrtko II.

Queen Dorothea died shortly before 1390, when her husband was negotiating a remarriage into the House of Habsburg.

== Bibliography ==
- Ančić, Mladen (1997). Putanja klatna: Ugarsko-hrvatsko kraljevstvo i Bosna u XIV. stoljeću (in Serbo-Croatian). Hrvatska akademija znanosti i umjetnosti.
- Andreev, Jordan; Lazarov, Ivan; Pavlov, Plamen (1999). Кой кой е в средновековна България [Who is Who in Medieval Bulgaria] (in Bulgarian). Petar Veron. ISBN 978-954-402-047-7.
- Babić, Anto (1972). Iz istorije srednjovjekovne Bosne (in Serbo-Croatian). Sarajevo: Svjetlost.
- Вожилов (Bozhilov), Иван (Ivan); Гюзелев, Васил (1999). История на средновековна България VII-XIV век (History of Medieval Bulgaria 7th-14th centuries) (in Bulgarian). София (Sofia): Анубис (Anubis). ISBN 954-426-204-0.
- Bozhilov, Ivan; Gyuzelev, Vasil (1999). История на средновековна България VII-XIV век (History of Medieval Bulgaria 7th-14th centuries) (in Bulgarian). Sofia: Anubis. ISBN 954-426-204-0.
- Ćorović, Vladimir (2001). Istorija srpskog naroda. Janus.
- Fine, John Van Antwerp Jr. (1994). The Late Medieval Balkans: A Critical Survey from the Late Twelfth Century to the Ottoman Conquest. Michigan: University of Michigan Press. ISBN 0-472-08260-4.
- Živković, Pavo (1981). Tvrtko II Tvrtković: Bosna u prvoj polovini xv stoljeća (in Serbo-Croatian). Sarajevo: Institut za istoriju. ISBN 0-472-08260-4.

Dorothea of Bulgaria Shishman dynasty
Royal titles
Vacant Title last held by Elizabeth of Kujawia	Banness consort of Bosnia; 1374–1377	Became queen
New title	Queen consort of Bosnia; 26 October 1377–1390	Vacant Title next held by Jelena Gruba
