= Anna of Wallachia, Empress of Serbia =

Ana

Empress consort of Serbia
- Tenure: c.1360–1371
- Spouse: Stefan Uroš V of Serbia
- House: Basarab
- Father: Nicholas Alexander of Wallachia
- Mother: Clara Dobokai

Ana (Serbian Cyrillic: Ана), Anka (Анка) or Anča (Анча), was one of the daughters of Nicolae Alexandru, Prince of Wallachia and wife of the Serbian Emperor Stefan Uroš V. Her sister, Anna, was the wife of Bulgarian Emperor Ivan Stratsimir.

She most likely married Uroš in the summer of 1360. She took monastic vows, becoming a nun, and adopted the name Jelena.
