= Clara Dobokai =

Princess consort of Wallachia (before 1330 – after 1370)

Doamna Clara Dobokai

Princess consort of Wallachia
- Reign: 1352-November 1364
- Predecessor: Doamna Marghita
- Successor: Doamna Ana
- Born: before 1330
- Died: after 1370
- Spouse: Nicholas Alexander of Wallachia
- Issue: Anna of Wallachia; Radu I of Wallachia; Anka of Wallacia
- Father: John Dobokai

Clara Dobokai (before 1330 – after 1370) was the second wife of Nicholas Alexander, Voivode of Wallachia.

== Origins ==
Clara was the daughter of a Hungarian nobleman, John Dobokai, whose domains were located in Transylvania. Her mother's name and family are unknown. Clara's father was present at a trial in 1312, showing that he was of age at that time. Clara was most probably born in the 1310s or 1320s, according to historian Mihai Florin Hasan. Hasan says that she was given in marriage to Nicholas Alexander of Wallachia in the early 1340s.

== Wife of Nicholas Alexandru ==
Nicholas Alexandru was the son of Basarab, the first independent ruler of Wallachia. Clara and Nicholas Alexandru had three children:

- Anna married to tsar Ivan Stracimir, Bulgarian ruler of Vidin Tsardom, and mother of Konstantin II Asen and Dorothea, Queen of Bosnia
- Voievode Radu I of Wallachia, succeeded his half brother Vladislav as voievode
- Anka Basaraba, married to Serbian Tsar Stefan Uros V, son of Stefan Dusan and Elena of Bulgaria

== Sources ==
- Hasan, Mihai Florin (2013). "Aspecte ale relațiilor matrimoniale munteano-maghiare din secolele XIV-XV [Aspects of the Hungarian-Wallachian matrimonial relations of the fourteenth and fifteenth centuries]". Revista Bistriţei (in Romanian). XXVII. Cumplexul Muzeal Bistrița-Năsăud: 128–159. ISSN 1222-5096.
