= Constantine II of Bulgaria =

Tsar of Bulgaria from 1397 to 1422

Constantine II

Emperor of Bulgaria
- Reign: 1397 – 1422
- Predecessor: Ivan Sratsimir
- Successor: Position abolished Mehmed I (as ruler of Ottoman Bulgaria); Alexander I (as prince of Bulgaria after the 1878 Treaty of Berlin)
- Born: 1369; Vidin, Tsardom of Bulgaria
- Died: 17 September 1422 (aged 52–53); Belgrade
- House: Sratsimir
- Father: Ivan Sratsimir
- Mother: Anna Basarab

Constantine II (Bulgarian: Константин, romanized: Konstantin) ruled as emperor (tsar) of the Tsardom of Vidin from 1397 to 1422. He was born in the early 1370s and died in exile at the Serbian court on 17 September 1422. Constantine II claimed the title Emperor of Bulgaria and was accepted as such by foreign governments, but he is often omitted from listings of rulers of Bulgaria.

== Life ==
Constantine II Asen was the son of Ivan Sratsimir (Ivan Sracimir) of Bulgaria by Anna, daughter of prince Nicolae Alexandru of Wallachia. He was crowned co-emperor by his father in or before 1395 when he was sent on a mission to the old Bulgarian capital Tarnovo. He had two sisters, one of whom, Dorothea, became the wife of Tvrtko I Kotromanić and the first queen of Bosnia. On his father's side, Constantine belonged to the Bulgarian royal dynasty of Shishman. His grandfather was Tsar Ivan Alexander. On his mother's side, he belonged to the Wallachian ruling dynasty of Basarab. His uncles were John Radul I and John Vladislav I, and Mirco the Elder was his first cousin.

Very little is known about Constantine II's circumstances after his father's arrest and imprisonment by Sultan Bayezid I in 1396. At that time, Ivan Stratsimir was contributing with soldiers to assist the Christian nations' bid to resist the advance of the Ottoman Empire. Following the Battle of Nicopolis, Vidin finally fell under the sphere of the Ottomans led by Bayezid I.

In a letter to Philip the Bold, Duke of Burgundy dated 16 April 1404, King Sigismund of Hungary listed 'renowned/illustrious Constantine, magnificent emperor of Bulgaria', alongside Stefan Lazarević and Mircea the Elder, as having returned to his protection and authority ["ad sinum majestatis nostrae sub nostra obedientia reversi sunt"].

Some Bulgarian historians, such as Plamen Pavlov and Ivan Tyutyundzhiev, suppose that Tsardom of Vidin's most western territories may have remained under Constantine II's rule almost until his death in 1422. Together with his cousin Fruzhin, son of Ivan Shishman. Constantine II took advantage of the Ottoman Interregnum to raise an anti-Ottoman revolt in northwestern Bulgaria. Constantine II was also allied to the Serbian despot Stefan Lazarević and the Wallachian voivode Mircea I. The anti-Ottoman rebellion lasted for half a decade (1408–1413) and spread to much of Bulgaria until the rebels were defeated by the Ottoman Sultan Musa.

The Bulgarians attempted to make up for their losses by siding with Musa's brother and rival Sultan Mehmed I, but the latter's victory did little to improve their situation. After Mehmed I's victory in 1413, Constantine II spent much of his life in Hungary and Serbia. His last possessions in Bulgaria were annexed by the Ottomans under Murad II in 1422, and shortly afterwards Constantine II died at the Serbian court on September 17, 1422.

Constantine II was the last emperor of Bulgaria, and his dispossession and death in 1422 marks the end of the Second Bulgarian Empire. The Ottoman conquest had begun in earnest half a century earlier, in 1369, and their rule lasted until 1878.

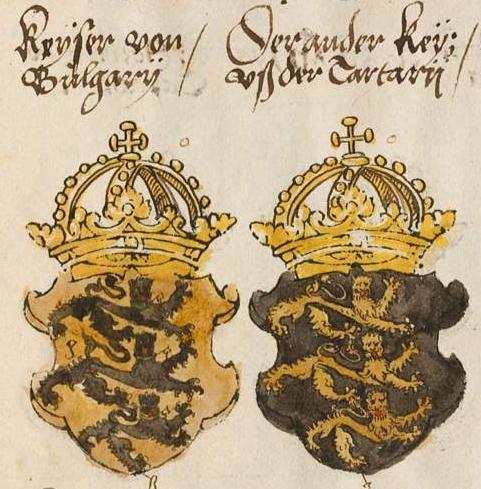
coat of arms on last bulgarian rulers Fruzhin and Konstantin II Asen in Bayerische Staatsbibliothek, München

== Honours ==
Konstantin Buttress on Nordenskjöld Coast in Graham Land, Antarctica, is named after Constantine II of Bulgaria.

== Notes ==
Regnal titles
Preceded by Ivan Sratsimir	Emperor of Bulgaria; 1397–1422	Vacant Annexation by Ottoman Empire Title next held by Alexander as Prince of Bulgaria
