= Princely Church of Saint Nicholas, Curtea de Argeș =

Romanian Orthodox religious building

Princely Church of Saint Nicholas
- Biserica Domnească din Curtea de Argeș
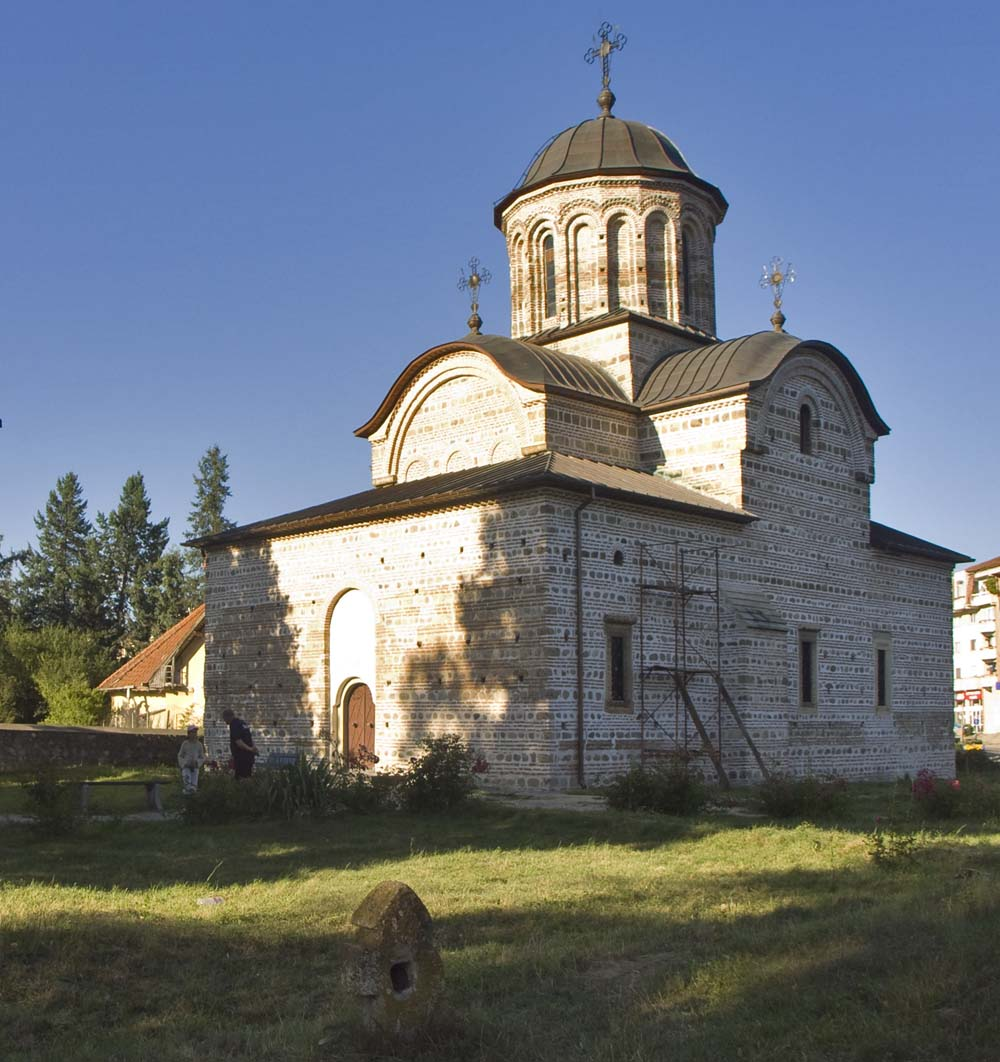
- Saint Nicholas' Princely Church

Religion
- Affiliation: Eastern Orthodox
- Ecclesiastical or organisational status: Cathedral
- Leadership: Archdiocese of Argeș and Muscel
- Patron: Saint Nicholas
- Status: Active

Location
- Location: Argeș(Romania)
- Interactive map of Princely Church of Saint Nicholas
- Coordinates: 45°08′N 24°41′E

Architecture
- Type: Church
- Style: Byzantine
- Founder: Basarab I
- Groundbreaking: 1352
- Completed: 1369

The Princely Church of Saint Nicholas in Curtea de Argeș was founded by Basarab I (1310 - 1352), completed in 1352, in the perimeter of the 13th century voievodal court. The church, a complex inscribed Greek cross monument, is one of the most representative monuments of medieval Romanian architecture, being the oldest voivode funded religious monument in Wallachia. The interior murals are from 1364 - 1369. The church is included on the new list of Romanian historical monuments: AG-II-m-A-13647.01 and in the UNESCO Indicative List.

== History ==
The construction of the church began under the reign of Basarab I, with it being continued by Nicolae Alexandru (1352 - 1364) and finished once with the mural painting, mostly preserved until today, under the reign of Vladislav I of Wallachia (1364 - 1377).

== Architecture ==
The architecture of the church is of the Byzantine type, the plan of the church belonging to the Cross-in-square type, ending with three apses to the east. The carved stone frames of the windows date back to the 17th century when the church was renovated. This church founded by the Basarabs in Curtea de Argeș is large: the rectangle in which the outer contour of its plan is inscribed is 14.55x23.50 m, and the height, measured at the top of the roof of the tower, reaches 23.00 m. The inner volume, well balanced, comprises three distinct rooms: a narrow narthex (2.80 m), a spacious nave (11.80 x 12.40 m) and the altar consisting of a large, central apse, framed by two apses. The nave, the main and most characteristic room of the church, has four pillars in the middle, arranged in a square shape. Through them, the interior is divided into three long compartments, three naves: one medium, wide, and two lateral, narrower, each extended to the east with an apse.

== Gallery ==
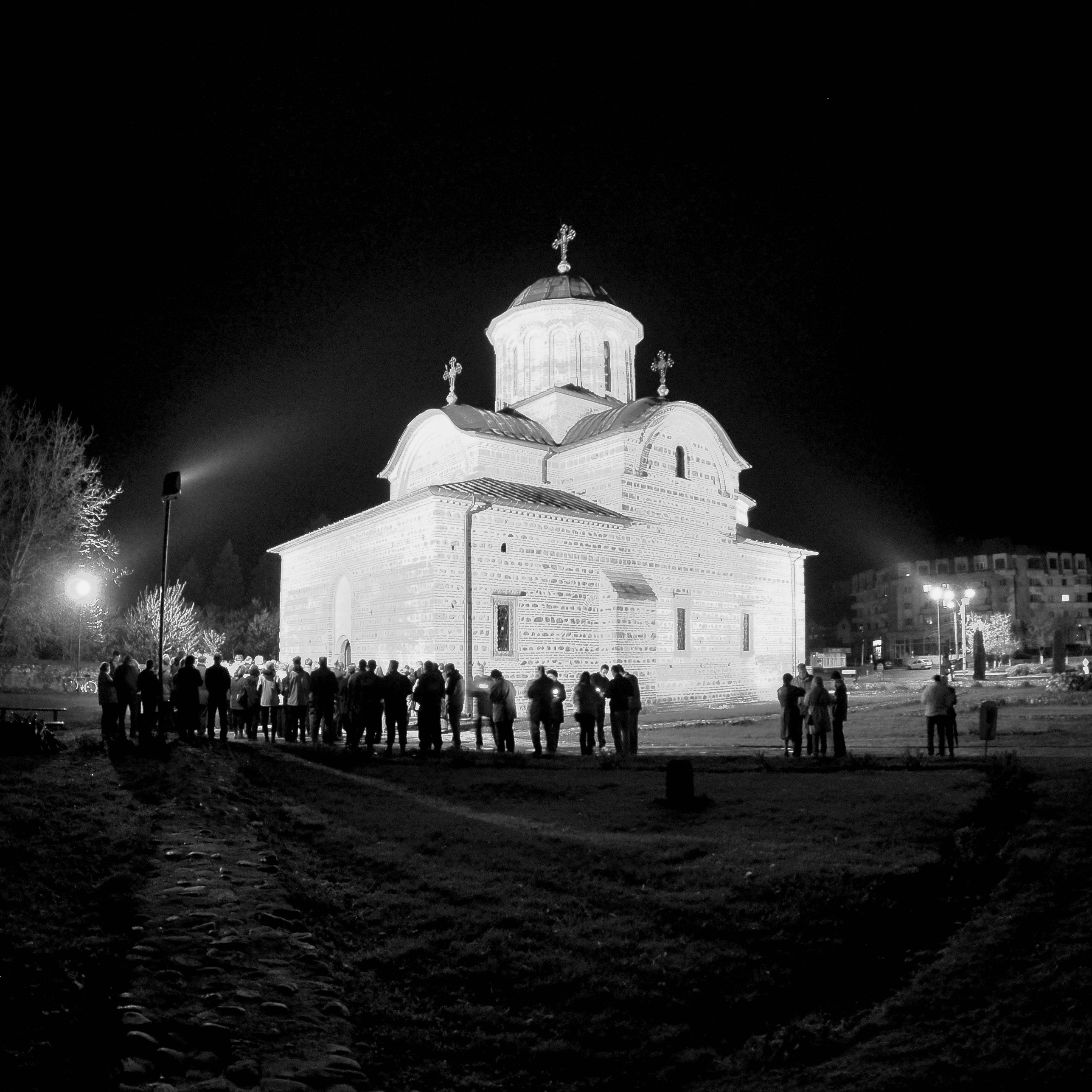

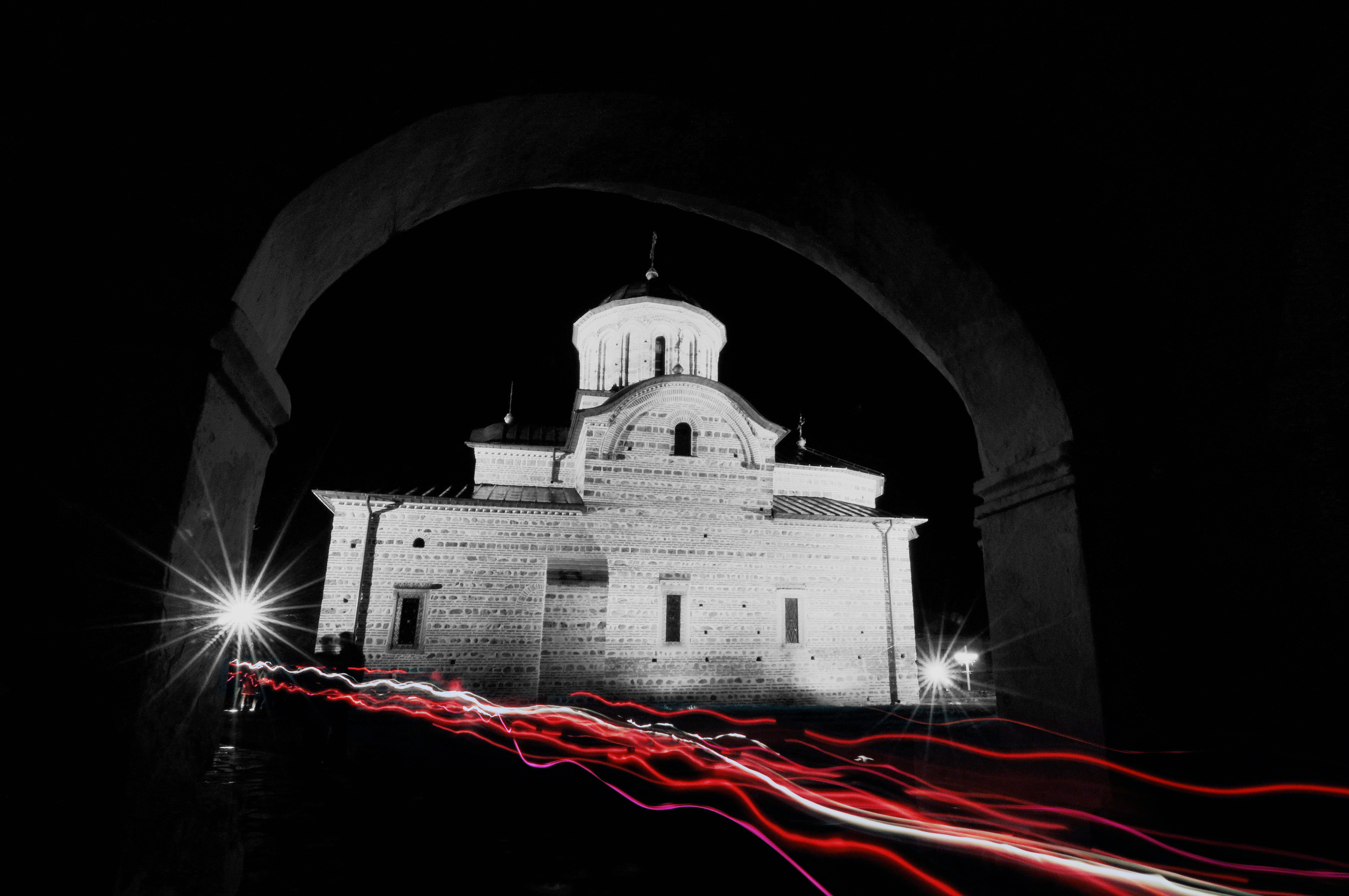

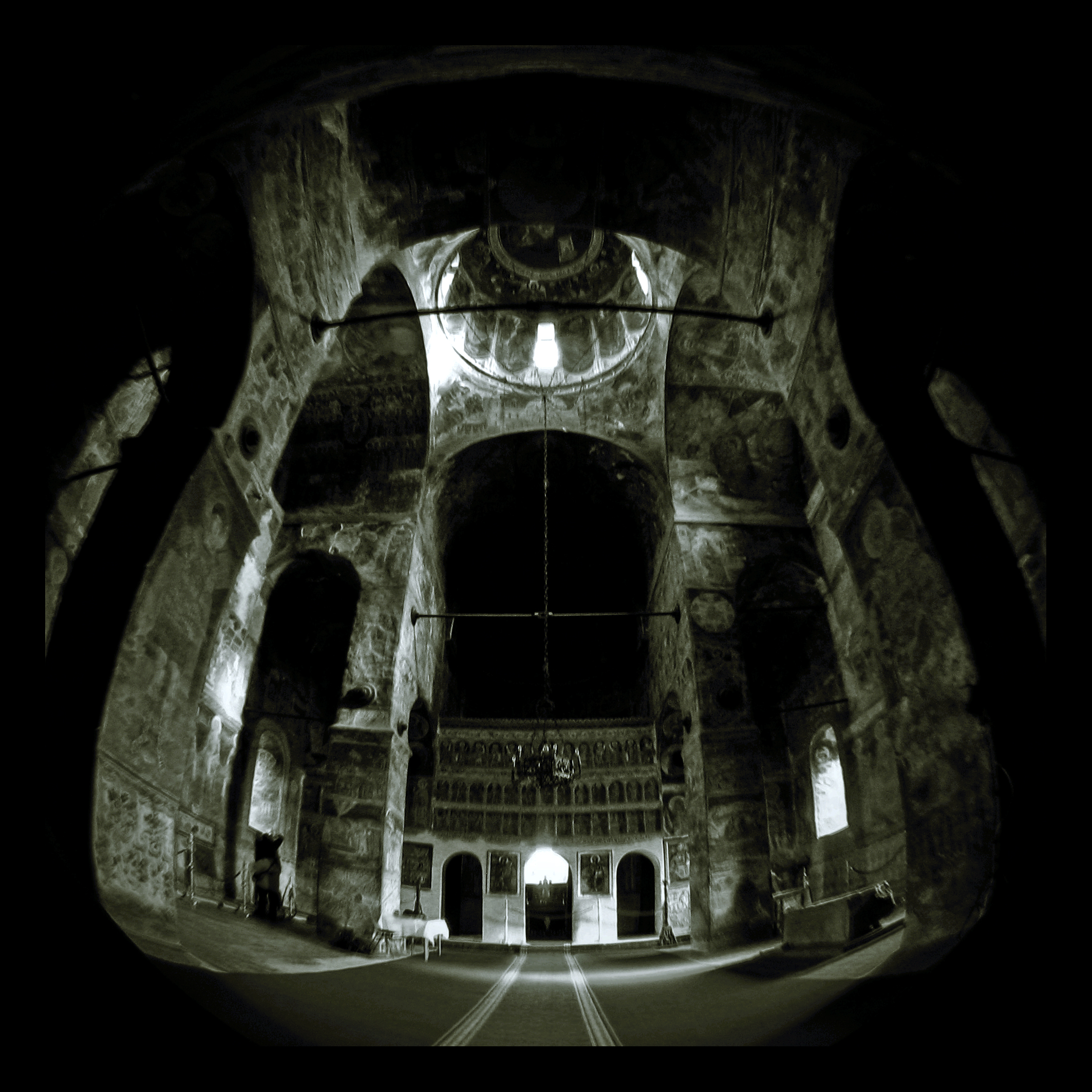

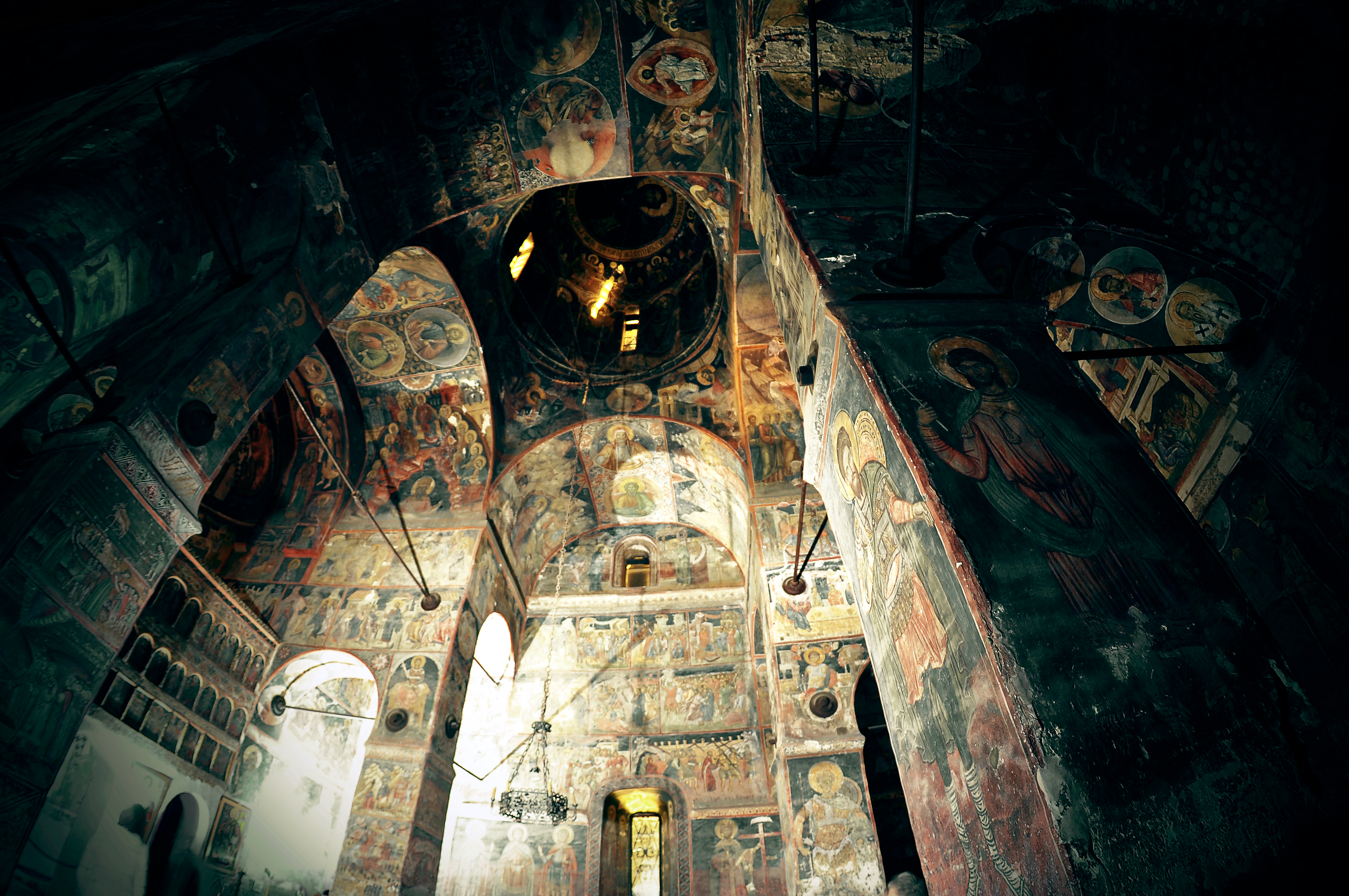

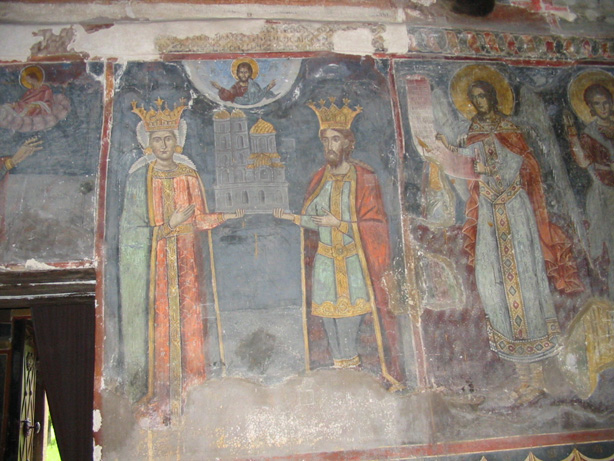

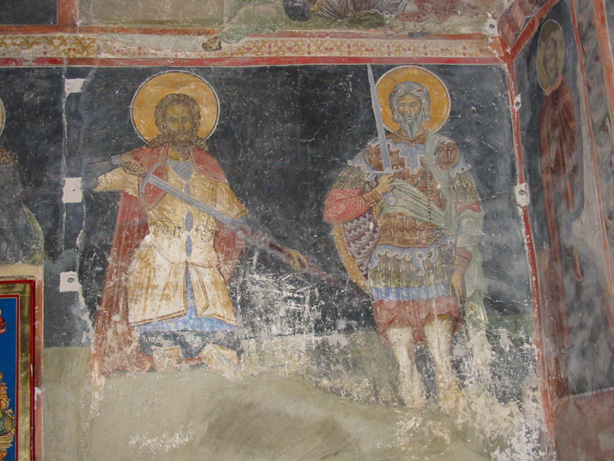

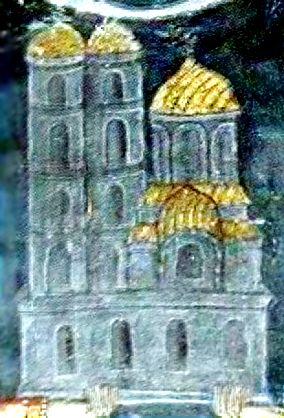

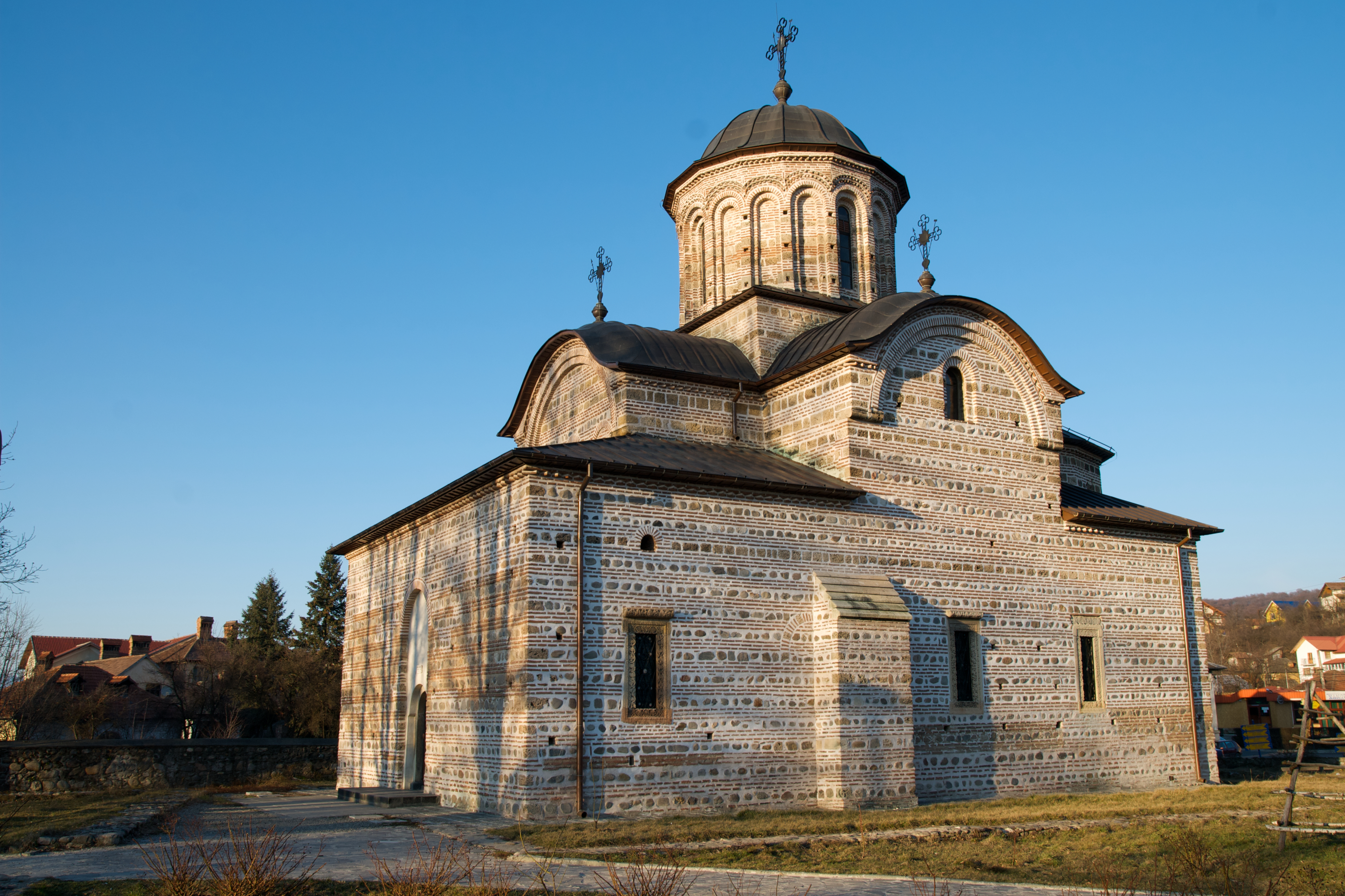

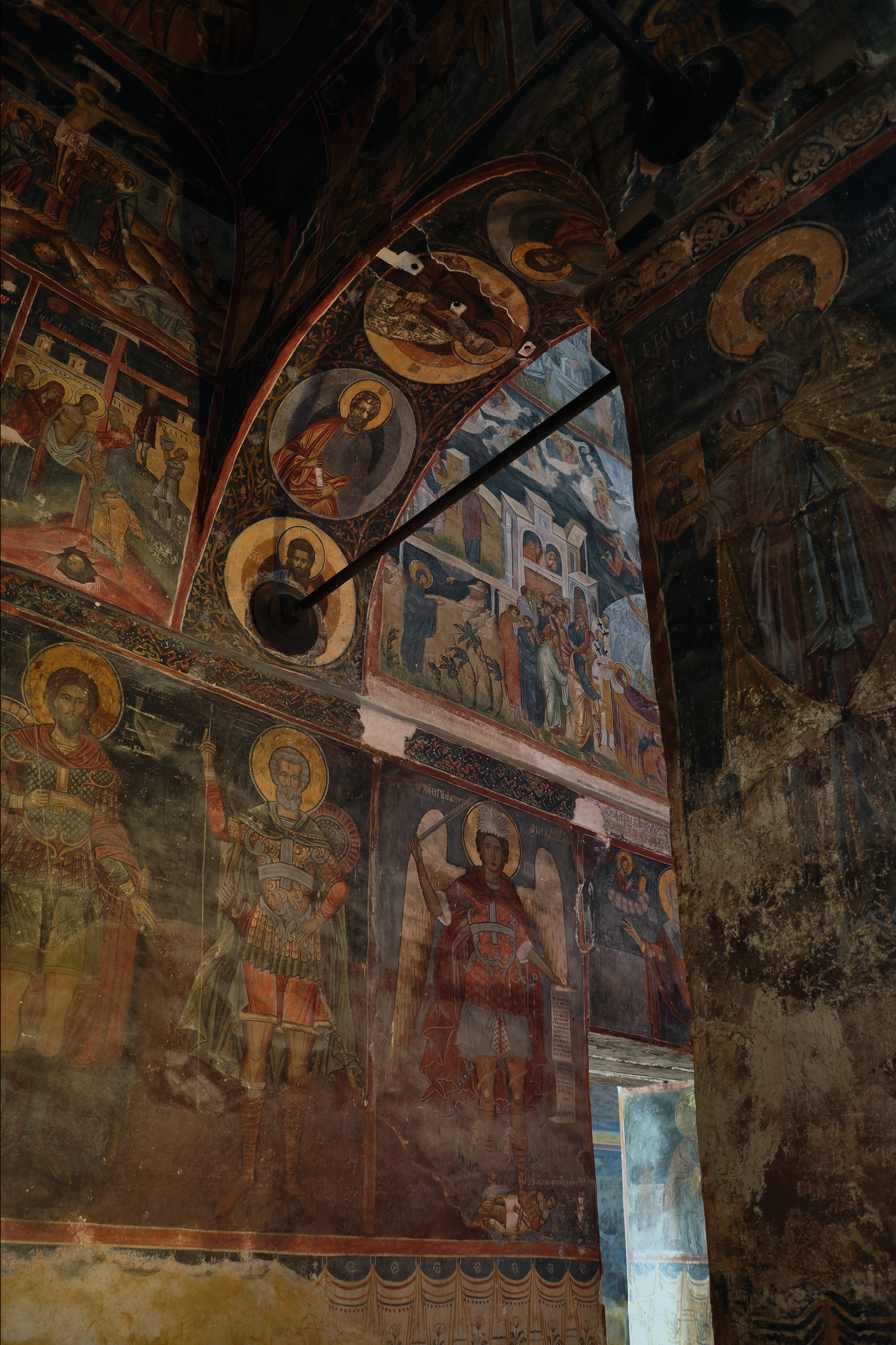

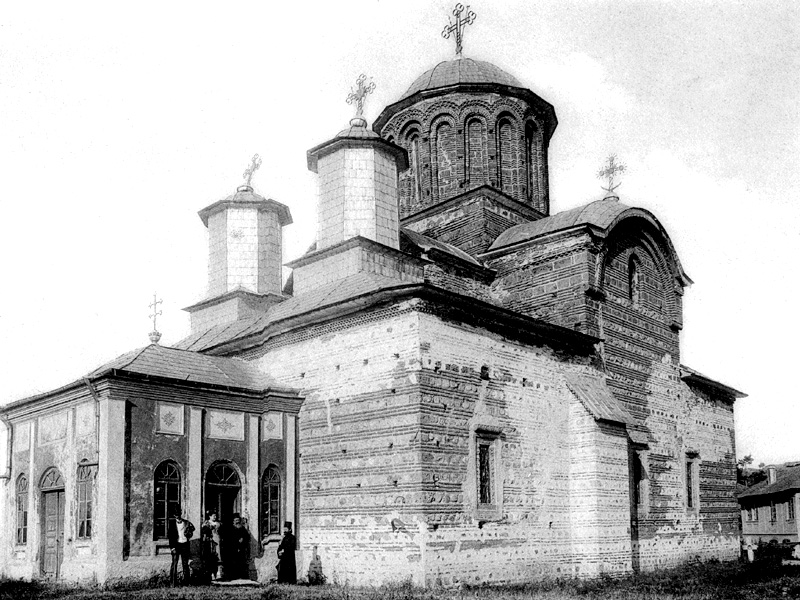
