= Radu Negru =

Legendary founder and first ruler of Wallachia

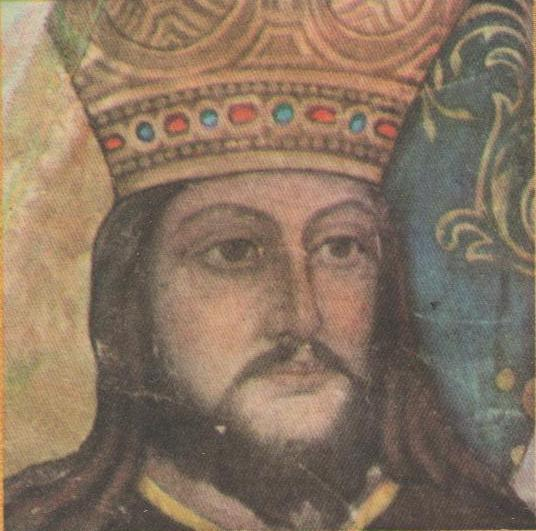
Fantasy portrait of Negru Vodă by Pierre Bellet

Radu Negru, also known as Negru Vodă ("The Black Voivode"), was a legendary voivode of Wallachia. He is a folk hero and the central figure behind the founding of Wallachia, which he would have ruled around 1290. His character and authenticity is typically regarded to be a blend of truth and fable, as many other similar and contemporary historical figures share his traits.

== Legend and Historicity ==
Radu Negru was first mentioned in the 17th-century Cantacuzino Annals, which also state that the prince built large churches in Câmpulung and Curtea de Argeș, successive capitals of Wallachia. The annals most likely refer to Radu I of Wallachia, who reigned from 1377 to 1383. There are no contemporary documents that correspond to a Wallachian voivode of his name ruling the area between the Southern Carpathians and the Danube river, however oral tradition as well as contemporary events do correlate to fragments of truth that can be detected in his legend.

According to the legend, Radu Negru is described as "hailing from Făgăraș" in Southern Transylvania. He was born sometime in the late 1260s and migrated south with fellow Wallachian boyars, clergy and peasants around 1290 due to his disdain of Hungarian rule, where he would found the Wallachian state and its first ruling dynasty. He settled Câmpulung and Curtea de Argeș, building important churches and fortification, as well as uniting local Vlach knezes under his authority. He would hold the Wallachian throne until 1304, after which Basarab I of Wallachia would usurp him in the following years.

Modern historians agree on a few key points, including a real migration of Romanian elites and people to the Curtea de Argeș and Câmpulung area, due to the fact that these areas were out of direct Hungarian control. In this case, the legend likely preserves a real process, but not necessarily a real person. The actual founder of Wallachia was almost certainly Basarab I, since he is the earliest documented ruler of Wallachia, who succeeded his father Thocomerius in 1310.

Radu Negru in the modern day is most likely considered to be a composite character, blending the historicity of multiple, attested early Vlach rulers and used by later chroniclers to provide Wallachia with a more noble origin story, akin to that of Romulus. In the various folk traditions and legends, Radu Negru's image blends with that of the following rulers:

- Thocomerius, father of Basarab I
- Basarab I (c. 1270–1351/52), First Voivode of Wallachia
- Nicolae Alexandru, Second Voivode of Wallachia (c. 1352 – 1364)
- Radu I, Voivode of Wallachia (c. 1377 – c. 1383)
- Neagoe Basarab, Voivode of Wallachia (1512-1521)

== See also ==
- Foundation of Wallachia
