= Queen Dorothea =

Queen Dorothea may refer to:

- Dorothea of Bulgaria, Queen consort of Bosnia (died in cca. 1390)
- Dorothea of Brandenburg, Queen consort of Denmark, Sweden and Norway (1430/31–1495)
- Dorothea of Saxe-Lauenburg, Queen consort of Denmark and Norway (1511–1571)
