= Hungarian–Wallachian War =

Hungarian–Wallachian War may refer:

- Battle of Posada (1330)
- Wallachian Campaign (1369)
- Hungarian–Ottoman War (1375–1377)
