= Dan I of Wallachia =

Dan I

Voivode of Wallachia
- Reign: 1383–1386
- Predecessor: Radu I of Wallachia
- Successor: Mircea the Elder
- Born: 1354
- Died: 23 September 1386; Bulgaria
- Spouse: Doamna Maria of Serbia
- Issue: Dan II of Wallachia
- House: House of Basarab (originally) House of Dăneşti
- Father: Radu I of Wallachia
- Mother: Doamna Ana

Dan I (1354 – 23 September 1386) was the ruler of Wallachia from 1383 to 1386. He was the son of Radu I of Wallachia and the half-brother of Mircea I of Wallachia.

The primary sources on his death agree that Dan was assassinated, but disagree on who killed him. He was either killed by his stepbrother Mircea I or by agents of Ivan Shishman of Bulgaria.

== Assassination ==
The circumstances surrounding his death are unclear. Laonikos Chalkokondyles claims that he was assassinated by his stepbrother Mircea I in collusion with a boyar party. However, the Anonymous Bulgarian Chronicle states that Dan I was assassinated during a campaign fought between 1384–1386 against Ivan Shishman of Tarnovo purportedly in favour of his half-brother Ivan Sratsimir of Vidin, but ultimately part of the early Wallachian rulers' attempts to expand their rule south of the Danube.

== Descendants ==
Dan I's descendants were members of the House of Dăneşti, one of the two factions descended from Basarab I, that were claimants to the voivodeship of the Principality of Wallachia in subsequent centuries. The other rival faction was the House of Drăculeşti.

Dan I of Wallachia House of Basarab Died: 23 September 1386
Regnal titles
Preceded by Radu I	Voivode of Wallachia c. 1383–1386	Succeeded by Mircea I
