= Ivan Asen IV =

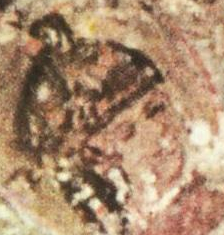
- Ivan Asen, Manasses Chronicle.
- Born: 1326
- Died: 1349 (aged 22–23)
- Spouse: Unknown
- Issue: 2 daughters
- House: Sratsimir
- Father: Ivan Alexander
- Mother: Theodora

Ivan Asen (Bulgarian: Иван Асен), also known as Ivan Asen IV, was a Bulgarian Prince, third son of Emperor Ivan Alexander from his first wife Theodora of Wallachia. He was born c. 1326.

Little is known about him. In the eighteenth year of the reign of Ivan Alexander - i. e. 1349 - he and his troops faced a 20,000-strong Ottoman army under the command of Murad I's elder brother Süleyman. The fierce battle between Bulgarians and Turks took place in the area around Sofia. According to the Anonymous Bulgarian chronicle, "the Turks killed Asen and a great number of Bulgarians"; according to Ottoman chronicles "many janissaries perished" in the battle. That shows that the battle claims many casualties from both sides and Ivan Asen perished fighting bravely for his country. It seems that despite the great losses the Bulgarians had repulsed the enemy as the next recorded Ottoman invasion occurred 6 years later, in 1355, when in the battle of Ihtiman the Ottoman Turks killed Asen's eldest brother, Michael Asen.

Ivan Asen IV married a Wallachian princess from the Basarab dynasty and had two daughters.

== Sources ==
- Andreev, Jordan (1993). Bǎlgarija prez vtorata četvǎrt na XIV v. (in Bulgarian). Veliko Tarnovo: Sv. Kliment Ohridski. OCLC 69163573.
