= Radu I of Wallachia =

Voivode of Wallachia (died 1383 or 1385)

Radu I
- Voivode of Wallachia
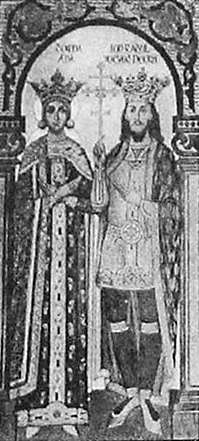
- Radu I and Doamna Ana, Curtea de Argeș mural (19th century)

Voivode of Wallachia
- Reign: c. 1377 – c. 1383/1385
- Predecessor: Vladislav I of Wallachia
- Successor: Dan I of Wallachia
- Died: 1383/1385
- Spouse: Doamna Ana; Doamna Calinichia
- Issue: Dan I of Wallachia; Mircea I of Wallachia; Jupan Staico
- House: Basarab
- Father: Nicolae Alexandru of Wallachia
- Mother: Doamna Clara Dobokai?

Radu I (died 1383 or 1385) was a Voivode of Wallachia (c. 1377 – c. 1383/1385). His year of birth is unattested in primary sources. He was the son of Nicolae Alexandru and half-brother and successor to Vladislav I. He is identified by historians as the name origin of the legendary Radu Negru, a mythical voievode of the early medieval state Wallachia, founder of the state's institutions and ruler.

== Beginning of reign ==
Radu was the only son of Nicholas Alexander of Wallachia by his second wife, Clara Dobokai. He was co-ruler with his half-brother Vladislav I at least from 1372. He may have started his reign as sole ruler after 9 July 1374 when the last documentary mention of his brother as being alive is dated. Unfortunately, there aren't any internal documents that could attest his reign. There are a few external mentions of him, primarily documents of the Kingdom of Hungary, a contemporary Italian chronicle, a late pisanie, an inscription on the walls of the Curtea de Argeș Princely Church and an important quantity of coins (ducati, dinari and bani) which were emitted by the voievod.

== Conflicts with the Kingdom of Hungary ==
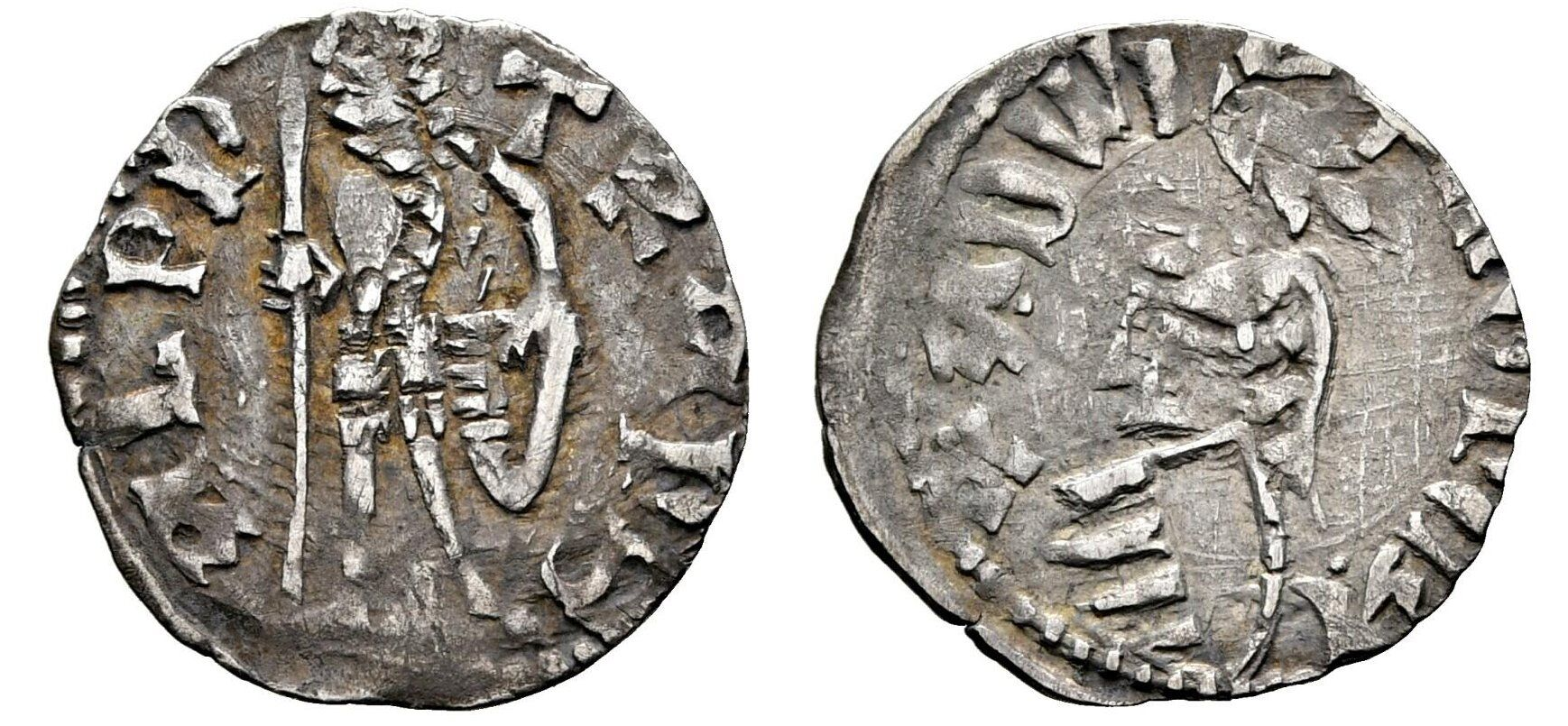
One type of coin emitted by Radu I

The relations with the Hungarian kingship during his reign remained tense, resulting in armed conflicts. The details of these fights remain unclear. An Italian chronicle "Cronaca Carrarese" tells about an expedition of the Hungarian king Louis the Great between 5 July - 14 August 1377 with the intention of subduing a one "Radano principe di Bulgaria infedele", identified with Radu I. These tense relations which preceded the fight are confirmed by the registers of the Venetian Republic where, in the same year, a large order of full-equip armors made by the Wallachian voievod appears. These armors were to be worn by those "armadura da cavali", 10.000 at number who were defeated in battle against the Hungarian king although the battle itself may have been inconclusive and without a clear result

It is hard to tell whether the troops of the Wallachian voievod were truly defeated, as from the internal documents of the Kingdom of Hungary which were published in the next period, it appears that the Hungarian king still had the intention of subduing the unfaithful voievod. Thus on 19 November of the same year, the king promised the Saxon traders of Transylvania from Brașov that if Wallachia becomes his possession he reduces the dues. On the contrary, in an order given to the landlord of Orșova in 1382 through which he was obliged to forbid any foreign trader to enter Wallachia with merchandise and to keep guard of the border "day and night" reporting everything that happened, there is no mention of a Hungarian ban of Severin, and Orșova appears as border point thus suggesting that the Eastern part of Banat was annexed by the Wallachian voievod Radu I.

Maybe linked to this fact is the strange name given to the voievod in the biography of Sigismund of Luxembourg in which, speaking of Vlad Dracul, it is said that he was the son of "Merzeweydan" (Mircea) and grandson of "Pankraz dem Weisen" (Pankraz the Wise). The name Pankraz (Pancratius) is explained from the deterioration of the name Radu Ban (ban of Severin, title taken after the conquest of the territory). Nevertheless, the Wallachian voievod, in another Hungarian document which is contemporary with the events of 1377, bears the name "Godon" as well strange and unclear.

== Other accomplishments ==
An important event linked to the reign of Radu I is the move of the remains of Saint Filofteia from Tarnovo to Argeș, event which happened app. in 1384 when the scene is painted on the walls of the Curtea de Argeș Church that became the guardian of the Saint and whose ctitor was the voievod with his brother and father. His activity as ctitor of religious establishments makes him one of the most active rulers of Wallachia, building a large number of churches with Tismana, Cozia and Cotmeana being the most important. Also, during his reign the two Catholic cathedrals from Severin (a. 1380) and Argeș (9 mai 1381) are built and following the tradition, a Catholic monastery in Târgoviște.

Another important and controversial moment of his reign is represented by his, not well supported by evidences, ruling/having a protector role over the smaller of the two Bulgarian states in that moment - the Tsardom of Vidin.At the basis of this theory stands an illegible inscription on the walls of Curtea de Argeș Cathedral in which, some researchers, identified the title „domn singur stăpânitor al Ungrovlahiei, al Vidinului și al oblastiei Vidinului“ ("sole ruler of Ungrovlahia, Vidin and the Oblast of Vidin"). It is true that the relations between the Wallachian rulers Vladislav I and Radu I and the Bulgarian Tsars from Tarnovo and Vidin, Shishman and Ivan Sratsimir were very tensed, the latter being themselves in conflicts for the succession of the paternal throne. Once, Vladislav I managed to annex Vidin, but he later gave it to the rightful ruler. It is possible that the same thing was done by Radu I.

== Death and tomb ==
The exact date of his death, as well as his tomb, remain unknown. While some place the date of his death in 1383, historian Constantin Rezachevici places it in early 1385 instead, based on a mention from 3 October 1385, during Dan I's reign. Archaeological digs carried out in 1920 around the voievodal necropolis (in the grounds of the Princely Church of Curtea de Argeș), have revealed a rich tomb dating from the end of the 14th century, presumed to be that of Radu I. More recent research however has determined that the tomb does not belong to Radu, but to a son of Basarab I.

Radu I of Wallachia House of Basarab Died: 1383/1385
Regnal titles
Preceded by Vladislav I	Voivode of Wallachia c. 1377 – c. 1383	Succeeded by Dan I
