= Theodora of Wallachia =

Theodora

Empress consort of Bulgaria
- Tenure: 1331–1345
- Born: Wallachia
- Died: Bulgaria
- Spouse: Ivan Alexander of Bulgaria
- Issue: Michael Asen IV; Ivan Sratsimir; Ivan Asen IV
- Dynasty: Basarab
- Father: Basarab I of Wallachia
- Mother: Doamna Margareta
- Religion: Bulgarian Orthodox

Theodora (Bulgarian: Теодора) of Wallachia was the daughter of Basarab I of Wallachia (r. 1310–1352) and Lady Margareta. She married Ivan Alexander of Bulgaria as his first wife. This marriage produced four children — Michael Asen, Ivan Sratsimir, Ivan Asen and Vasilisa. In 1345 Tsar Ivan Alexander divorced Tsaritsa Theodora and sent her into a monastery as a nun under the name Teofana.

She is considered the first known nun in Romanian history and in 2022 she was canonized by the Romanian Orthodox Church under the name of Venerable Theopahno Basarab. Her feast day was chosen to be 28 October.

Preceded by Theodora Palaiologina	Empress consort of Bulgaria; 1331–1345	Succeeded by Sarah-Theodora
