= Anna of Wallachia =

Empress consort of Bulgaria
- Tenure: 1356/1357 – ?
- Predecessor: unknown
- Successor: Elizabeth of Bosnia
- Born: Wallachia
- Spouse: Ivan Sratsimir
- Issue: Dorothea; Constantine II; Unknown daughter
- Dynasty: Basarab
- Father: Nicholas Alexander of Wallachia
- Mother: Clara Dobokai

Anna of Wallachia or Anna Basarab (Bulgarian: Анна Басараб) was a Wallachian princess and Empress consort of Bulgaria in Vidin, second wife of Emperor Ivan Sratsimir.

She was the daughter of Nicholas Alexander of Wallachia and his Catholic second wife, the Hungarian Clara Dobokai. Her younger sister, Anka, married the Serbian king Stephen Uroš V. Her father's sister was Theodora, the first wife of Emperor Ivan Alexander (r. 1331–1371) and mother of Ivan Sratsimir - thus, Ivan and Anna were first cousins.

She married Ivan Sratsimir in 1356–1357. The marriage was a reaction to Ivan Alexander's divorce from Theodora and was aimed at weakening the position of the new empress, Sarah-Theodora. It is not known whether Theodora had any role in the arrangement of the wedding between her son and her niece or whether it was done on her initiative.

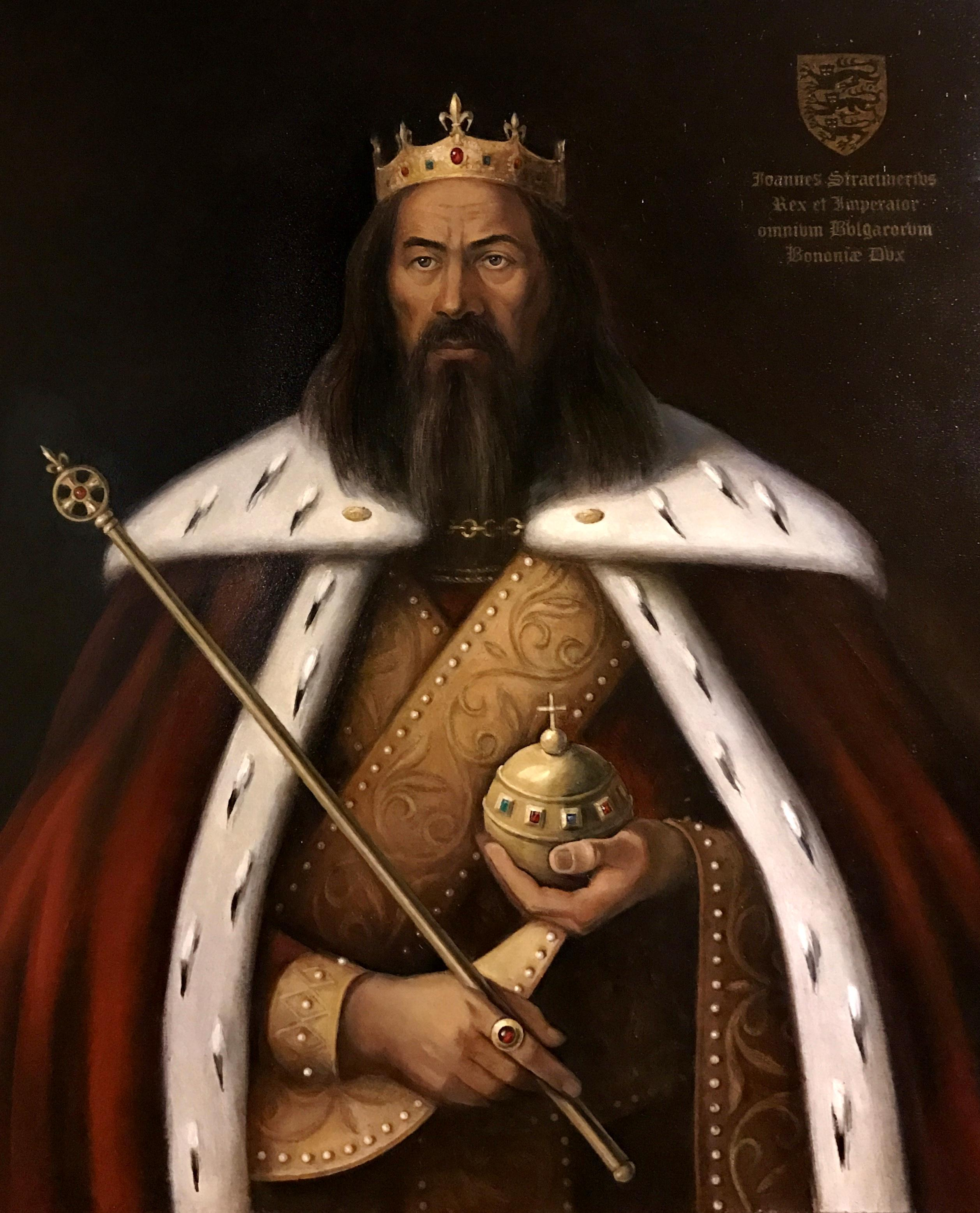
Portrait of Anna's husband Ivan Sratsimir, 19th century

Between 1365 and 1369, Vidin was occupied by the Kingdom of Hungary. The ruling family was held captive in the castle of Humnik (in Bosiljevo, Croatia), where they were forced to convert to Catholicism. They were later released but Anna's daughters remained in Hungary. One of them died at a young age but Dorothea married the Ban (and later King) of Bosnia Tvrtko I.

Anna is also known to have ordered the Vidin Psalter of 1359–1360. The empress was raised a Catholic. It is unknown whether she became Eastern Orthodox in Bulgaria but the book she ordered contains only hagiographies of Orthodox saints, which is a hint that she most likely converted to Orthodoxy.

== Family ==
The marriage produced three children – a son and two daughters:

- Constantine II, who claimed his father's title Emperor of Bulgaria after the fall of Vidin
- Dorothea of Bulgaria, who became Queen consort of Bosnia
- An unknown daughter

== Sources ==
- Божилов, Иван. Фамилията на Асеневџи (1186–1460), София, 1985
