= Calinichia =

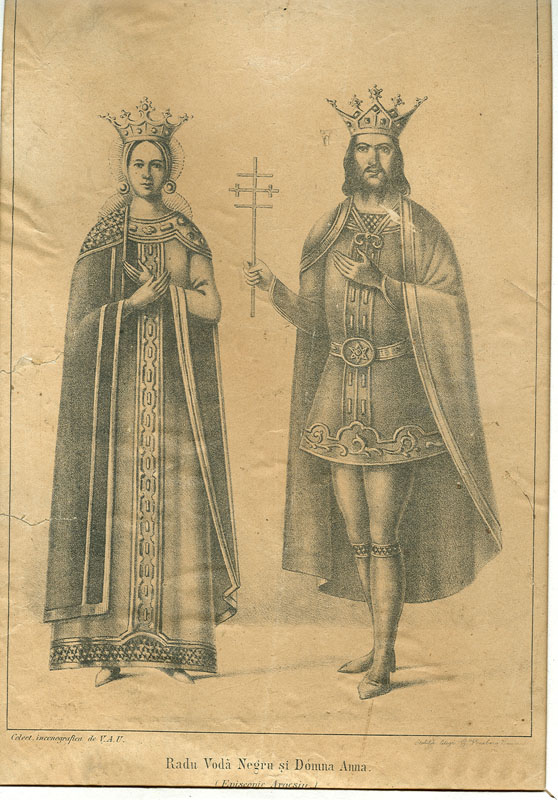
- Calinichia (left) with her husband, Radu (right)
- Died: c. 1439
- Spouse: Radu I of Wallachia
- Issue: Mircea I of Wallachia

Calinichia (died c. 1439), better known as Lady Calinica and sometimes as Kalinikia (Romanian: Calinichia, Calinița or Ana-Călina; Middle Bulgarian: Калиникіѧ, Kalinikĭę), was the second wife of Radu I, a 14th-century Wallachian voivode (ruler). Calinichia was of Greek origin, and was the mother of Mircea I of Wallachia. She was a Byzantine princess of Komnenos family.
