= Tsardom of Vidin =

Medieval tsardom in Bulgaria centered in Vidin

Tsardom of Vidin Видинско Царство (Bulgarian) Vidinsko Tsarstvo
- 1369–1396
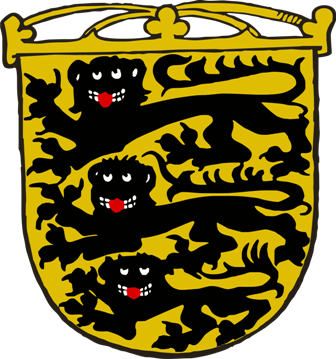
- Flag Coat of arms of the House of Shishman

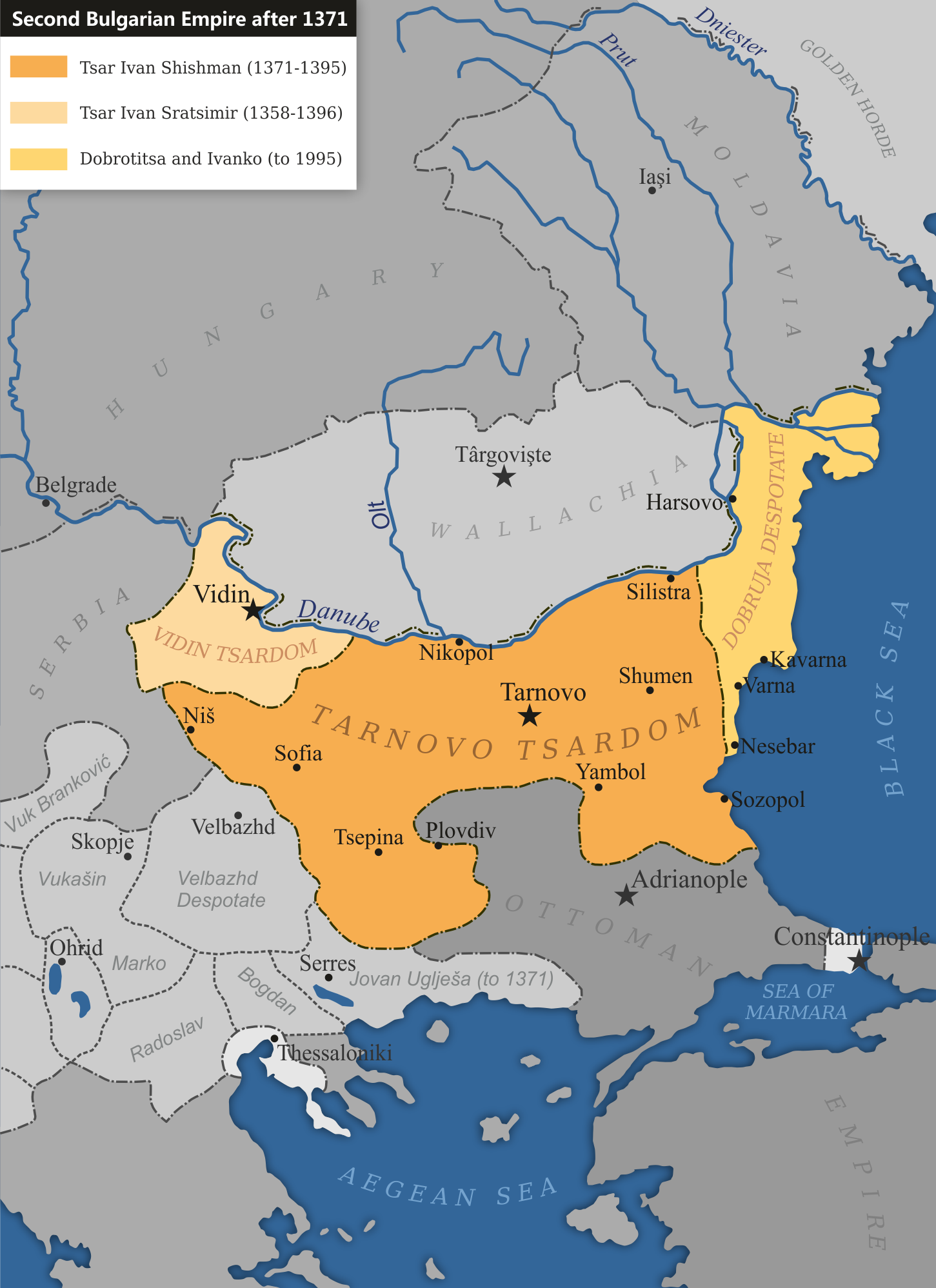
- The Tsardom of Vidin
- Status: Tsardom; Despotate; Hungarian rule (1365–1369)
- Capital and largest city: Vidin
- Common languages: Bulgarian
- Other languages: Middle Bulgarian
- Religion: Orthodox Christianity
- Government: Monarchy
- Tsar / Despot
- Historical era: Middle Ages
  - Established: 1369
  - Disestablished: 1396
Preceded by	Succeeded by
Second Bulgarian Empire	Ottoman Empire
- Today part of: Bulgaria; Serbia

The Tsardom of Vidin (Bulgarian: Видинско Царство, romanized: Vidinsko Tsarstvo) was a medieval Bulgarian state centred in the city of Vidin from 1369–1396.

== Early history ==
In 1257, Rostislav Mikhailovich attacked the Bulgarian capital of Tarnovo, but failed to take it, so he retreated to Vidin where he established himself, claiming the title of Tsar of Bulgaria, and the Hungarians recognized him with this title.

Since the middle of the 13th century, the area of Vidin had been autonomous under ineffective Bulgarian overlordship, and was ruled successively by Yakov Svetoslav (died 1276), Shishman (died between 1308 and 1313), and then his son Michael Shishman, who received the high courtly title of despotēs from his cousin, Theodore Svetoslav, and was referred to in a contemporary Venetian source as a Despot of Bulgaria and Lord of Vidin.

Jacob Svetoslav was the ruler of a widely autonomous domain of the Second Bulgarian Empire most likely located around Sofia. Seeking further independence and claiming the title of Emperor of Bulgaria, he twice changed allegiance from Bulgaria to the Kingdom of Hungary and vice versa, and the Hungarians recognized his Bulgarian royal rank as their vassal and ruler of Vidin (medieval Bdin).

By 1261, he had become a despot, a high-ranking noble in the Bulgarian hierarchy. The title was awarded to him probably by his own suzerain, the ruler of Bulgaria, rather than a Byzantine emperor, possibly Constantine Tih. Jacob Svetoslav was close to the Bulgarian court and pledged loyalty to Constantine. Thus, the tsar made him the ruler of a domain usually considered to have been south of the Vidin region in the west of the Bulgarian Empire. Byzantine sources indicate his possessions lay "near Haemus", thus close to Sofia, between the Hungarian possessions to the north and Macedonia to the south.

The death of Stephen V in 1272 meant that he was succeeded by his infant son Ladislaus IV, with the widowed consort and mother of the boy, Elizabeth, as his regent. At the time, Jacob Svetoslav still held Vidin as a Hungarian vassal. Possibly in 1273, Hungarian rule in Braničevo, west of Jacob's domain, was put to an end by two Cuman–Bulgarian nobles, Darman and Kudelin. Cut off from his Hungarian suzerains and facing the menace of a Bulgarian attack from the east, Jacob Svetoslav once again submitted to Bulgarian rule. He arrived in the capital Tarnovo to negotiate his submission with Constantine's consort Maria Palaiologina Kantakouzene, who was the dominant figure in the empire at the time due to the Tsar's paralysis. There, Jacob was formally adopted by the much younger Maria as her second son, after the infant heir Michael Asen II. This adoption solidified Jacob's ties to the court and meant that he could safely retain his autonomous domain as a Bulgarian vassal. He also harboured hopes to ascend to the throne by ousting Michael when Constantine died. Suspicious of these disloyal intentions of Jacob's, Constantine's consort Maria is thought to have poisoned him, and he died in 1275 or 1276/1777, shortly before the Uprising of Ivaylo.

While the fate of the city of Vidin itself is unclear, at least part of Jacob's possessions were certainly restored to direct Bulgarian rule in the wake of his death. One such territory was the Svrljig region lying southwest of Vidin, which in 1278 was documented as belonging to Bulgaria.

Shishman of Vidin, Bulgarian nobleman (boyar), ruled the semi-independent despotate based out of the Danubian fortress in the late 13th and early 14th century (1270s/1280s - before 1308/1313). Shishman was bestowed the title of "despot" by Bulgarian emperors Theodore Svetoslav of Bulgaria and George Terter I. By early 1290s Serbia expanded towards the vicinity of Vidin. In 1291, it came under Golden Horde ("Tatar") suzerainty and in 1292 he was in charge of an unsuccessful campaign against neighboring Serbia. Even though the Serbs captured Vidin in their counter-offensive, perhaps thanks to Tatar influence Shishman was placed once more as the ruler of the region. As his son and successor as despot of Vidin Michael Shishman acceded to the Bulgarian throne in 1323, Shishman was the progenitor of the last medieval Bulgarian royal dynasty, the Shishman dynasty.

Born between 1280 and 1292 Michael Shishman was the son of the despot Shishman of Vidin by an unnamed daughter of the sebastokrator Peter and Anna (Theodora), herself daughter of Ivan Asen II (r. 1218-1241) and Irene Komnene of Epirus. He was also a distant cousin of his predecessors on the Bulgarian throne, Theodore Svetoslav (r. 1300-1321) and George Terter II (r. 1321-1322). After the peace between his father and Stefan Milutin in 1292, Michael Shishman was engaged to Milutin's daughter Anna Neda and they married in 1298 or 1299.

After Serbian king Stefan Milutin´s death, in 1321 in Serbia occurred a period of civil war. Michael Shishman was able to follow a more active policy in the Bulgarian capital Tarnovo. He soon became a leading noble in the internal affairs of the country and, on the childless death of young George Terter II in 1323, Michael Shishman was elected emperor of Bulgaria by the nobility. According to some historians he was chosen because he was a descendant of the Asen dynasty and interpret his ascencion to the throne not as the beginning of a new dynasty but rather as a continuation of the House of Asen. His half-brother, Belaur, succeeded him as last despot of Vidin.

== Tsardom of Vidin ==
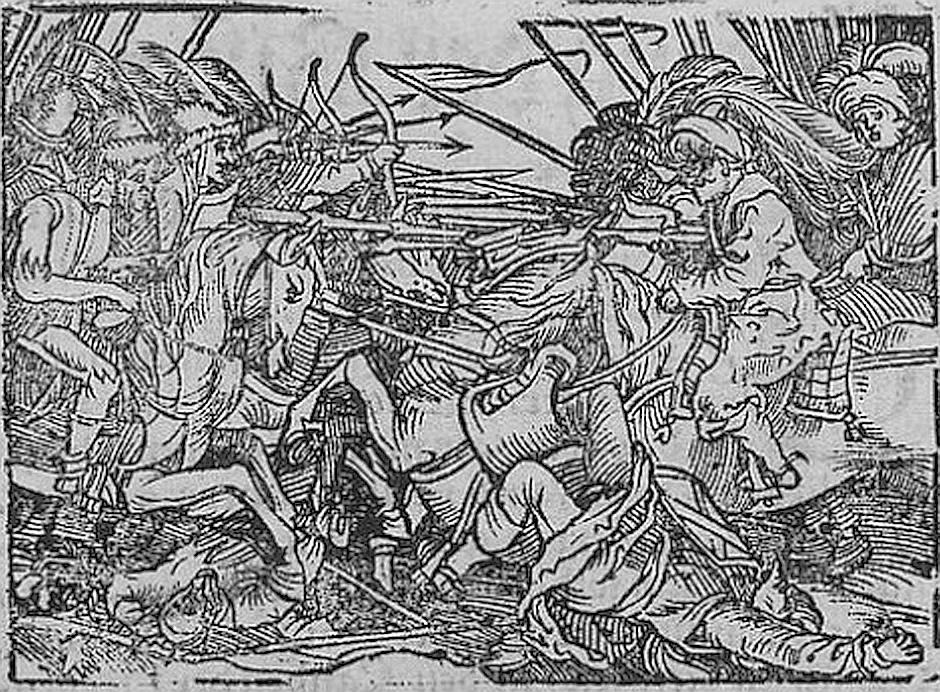
Battle between Magyarian and Turkish forces near Vidin 1396

In 1356, Bulgarian tsar Ivan Alexander isolated Vidin from the Bulgarian monarchy and appointed his son Ivan Stratsimir (1356–1396) as absolute ruler, the first Tsar of the domain of Vidin.

In 1365, the state was occupied by Hungarian crusaders, but the occupation was short-lived. Although the initial campaign was not entirely successful because the Hungarians seized the city back, the ensuing negotiations between the Kingdom of Hungary and Ivan Alexander's allies, Vladislav I Vlaicu and Dobrotitsa, the despot of the semi-independent Dobrujan Principality of Karvuna, led to the return of the city to Bulgarian possession. It is thought that Ivan Sratsimir was reinstalled as the region's ruler in the autumn of 1369. In 1393 the whole of Bulgaria, along with the rest of the surrounding region, fell to the Ottoman Empire. This brought an end to Bulgaria's medieval state empire. Vidin was now the only region controlled by the indigenous Bulgarian population and not the invading Ottoman Turks.

The Ottomans went on to conquer the despotates of Dobruja, Prilep, and Velbazhd as well. Vidin's independence did not last long. In 1396, Stratsimir contributed soldiers to assist the Christian nations' bid to overturn the Ottoman Empire. Following defeat at the hands of the Ottomans outside the city of Nicopolis, Vidin finally fell under the sphere of the Ottomans led by Bayezid I. However, some historians, such as Plamen Pavlov and Ivan Tyutyundzhiev, assume that Constantine II succeeded his father as Tsar (1397–1422), and controlled part of the Bulgarian lands, including Vidin, as a vassal, with some countries recognizing him as Tsar of the Bulgarians.

== Despots and Tsars of Vidin ==
- Shishman, despot (duke), later tsar (self-proclaimed) (1280 — 1308), the founder of Shishman dynasty
- Michael I, despot (1308 — 1323), son of Shishman, elected to tsar of Bulgaria and used the name Michael III.
- Belaur, despot (1323 — 1336), brother of Michael III, removed by Ivan Alexander.
- Ivan IV Asen, prince and co-tsar (1337 — 1349), son of tsar Ivan Alexander
- Michael IV Asen, prince and co-tsar (1337 — 1349), son of tsar Ivan Alexander
- Shishman II, claimant in exile
- Ivan Sratsimir, tsar (1356 — 1365), son of Bulgarian tsar Ivan Alexander
- Hungarian rule (1365 — 1369).
- Sratsimir, tsar (1369 — 1396) second reign
- Constantine II, tsar (1396 — 1422)
- Ottoman conquest
