= House of Basarab =

Wallachian noble family

- Princely noble house
- Country: Wallachia
- Founded: 1310; 716 years ago
- Founder: Basarab I of Wallachia
- Final ruler: Alexandru Coconul (Drăculești, 1623–27); Moise (Dănești, 1529–30)
- Titles: Prince (Voivode; Hospodar)
- Estate: of Wallachia
- Cadet branches: House of Dănești; House of Drăculești

The House of Basarab (sometimes spelled as Bazarab, Romanian: Basarab pronounced [basaˈrab]) was a ruling family that established the Principality of Wallachia, giving the country its first line of Princes, one closely related with the Mușatin rulers of Moldavia. Its status as a dynasty is rendered problematic by the official elective system, which implied that male members of the same family, including illegitimate offspring, were chosen to rule by a council of boyars (more often than not, the election was conditioned by the military force exercised by candidates). After the rule of Alexandru I Aldea (ended in 1436), the house was split by the conflict between the Dănești and the Drăculești, both of which claimed legitimacy. Several late rulers of the Craiovești claimed direct descent from the House after its eventual demise, including Neagoe Basarab, Matei Basarab, Constantin Șerban, Șerban Cantacuzino, and Constantin Brâncoveanu.

Rulers usually mentioned as members of the House include (in chronological order of first rule) Mircea the Elder, Dan II, Vlad II Dracul, Vlad III the Impaler, Vlad the Monk, Radu IV the Great, and Radu of Afumați.

== Name and origins ==
The dynasty was named after Voivode Basarab I (r. around 1320 – 1352), who gained the independence of Wallachia from the Kingdom of Hungary.

The origin of the family is highly disputed, with theories suggesting either a Vlach, Cuman, or Slavic background. However, there is no scholarly consensus on their actual origin. The Cuman hypothesis is largely based on the origin of Basarab's name, but remains unproven. At least four royal charters from the 14th century refer to Basarab as a 'Vlach' and in his lifetime Basarab would have certainly considered himself as a member of the Romanian elite of Wallachia.

The name Basarab is of Cuman or Pecheneg Turkic origin and most likely meant "conquering or reigning father"; Bas was the present participle of the verb "to rule", while the second part is believed to derive from the honorary title -aba "father", recognizable in many Cuman names, such as Terteroba, Arslanapa, and Ursoba. Besides the Cumans, the name was also common among Romanians in medieval Wallachia and Transylvania. Basarab's baptismal name was most likely "Ioan" or "Ivanco", as noted in the preface to the Dušan Code and other Serbian and Bulgarian documents. Basarab's "possible" father Thocomerius likely bore a Latin rendering of the Slavic name "Tihomir", a common name amongst Vlachs and South Slavs in the Middle Ages. Alternatively, the name is identified as Toq-tämir, a Cuman and Tatar name attested in the 13th century. Some historians consider the name's origin a weak argument to support the Dynasty's Cuman origin, while they believe contemporary documents that universally regard Basarab as "Vlach" to be of greater relevance.

== Genealogy ==
The following genealogical tree is a simplified version, meant to show the ruling princes, their documented brothers and sisters, and the spouses/extramarital liaisons of those who had ruling heirs, following the conventions:

- Ruling princes have their name emphasized and their ruling years in Wallachia.
- Several members of House of Basarab ruled in Moldavia; those reigning years are marked with M.
- Small numbers at the end of each name are meant to indicate the mother of each offspring.
- There are two branches of the dynasty: Drăculeşti (DR) and Dăneşti (DA)
- If the prince died while ruling, the last year is preceded by a cross.
- Spouses and extramarital liaisons are separated by a horizontal line.

House of Basarab

Basarab I 1310-†1352	Margareta
Theodora of Wallachia	Ivan Alexander of Bulgaria	Nicolae Alexandru; 1352-†1364	Maria Lackfy^{1} Clara Dobokai^{2} Maria Dabkai^{3}
Royal dynasty of Bulgaria	Vladislav I^{1} 1364-†1377	Radu I^{1} 1377-†1383	Ana^{1} Kalinikia^{2}	Vladislaus II of Opole With Catarine Elis^{1}	Elisabeth of Wallachia	Vojislav^{1}	Anna of Wallachia ^{2}	Ivan Sratsimir of Bulgaria	Anca^{2}	Stephen Uroš V of Serbia
Dan I^{DA1} 1383-†1386	Maria of Serbia	Staico^{2}	Mircea I^{2} 1386-1394; 1397-†1418	Maria Tolmay ^{1} Anca^{2}	Royal dynasty of Silesia	Royal dynasty of Bulgaria	Royal dynasty of Serbia
Dan II ^{DA} 1422-1427; 1427-†1431	?	Ioan	Vlad I?1394-†1397	Mihail I^{1} 1418-†1420	?	Radu II^{1} 1420-1422 †1427	Alexandru I^{1} 1431-†1436	Vlad II Dracul^{DR,1} 1436-1442; 1444-†1447	?^{1} Vassilissa of Moldavia^{2} Călţuna^{3} ?^{4}
Basarab II^{DA} 1442-1444	Maria	Dan III of Wallachia Stanciul	Vladislav II^{DA} 1447-1448; 1448-†1456	Neacşa	Basarab III^{DA} 1473; 1474; 1475-1476; 1476-1477	Radu Mihail	Mircea II^{DR,1} 1442	Vlad IV Calugarul^{DR}	Radu III the Fair^{DR}	Alexandra^{2}	Vlad III the Impaler^{DR}	Mircea (Illegitimate)^{DR,4} 1480
Basarab the Young	Vladislav	Radu IV the Great	Vlad cel Tânăr	Mihnea cel Rău
Neagoe Basarab; CRAIOVEŞTI	Vladislav III of Wallachia	Radu of Afumați	Radu Bădica	Radu Paisie	Mircea the Shepherd	Vlad Vintilă de la Slatina	Vlad VI Înecatul	Mircea III Dracul
Teodosie of Wallachia	Stephen IV of Moldavia	Radu of Afumați	Moise of Wallachia	Radu Ilie Haidăul	Pătrașcu the Good	Peter the Younger	Alexander II Mircea	Peter the Lame

== A printed family tree ==
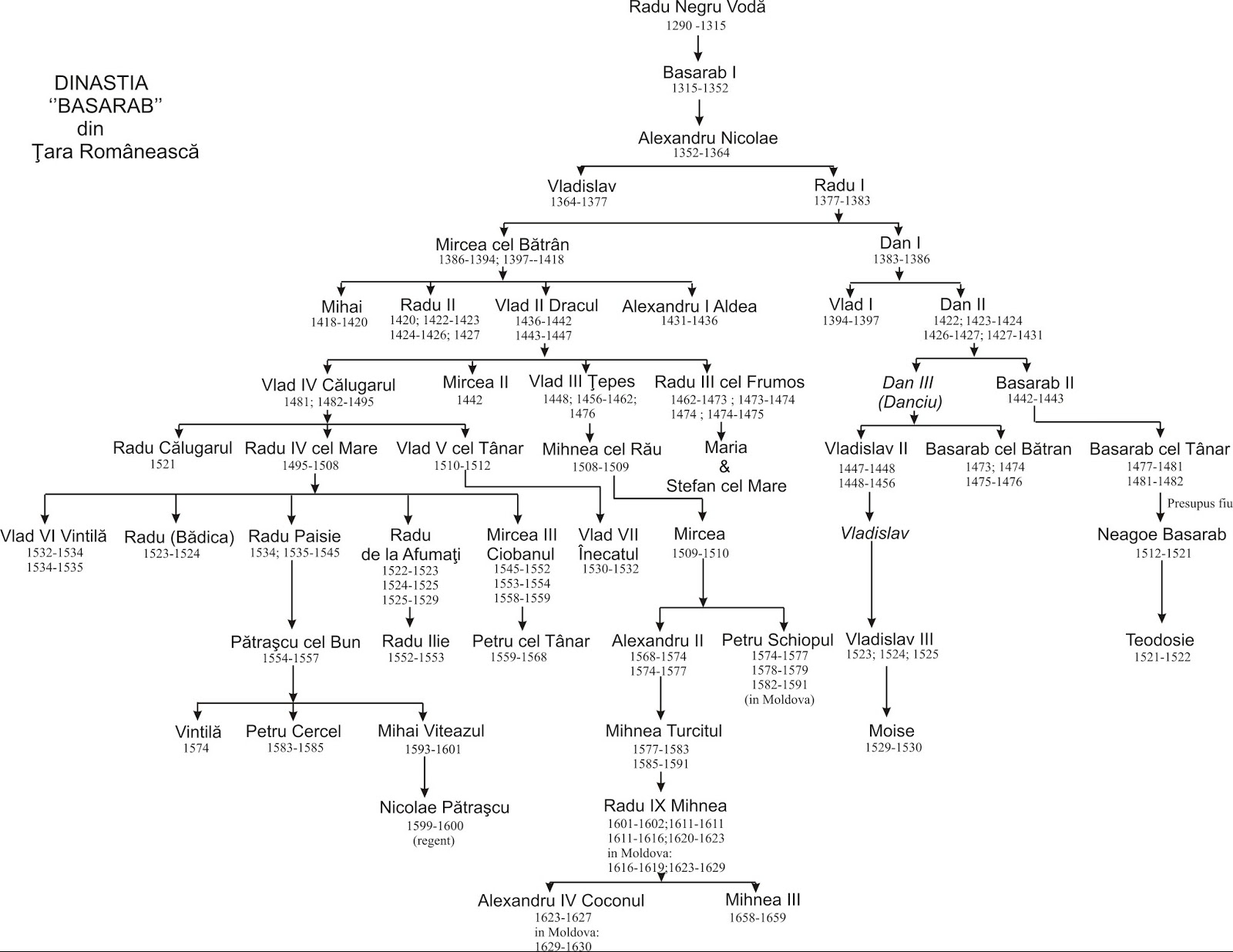

Basarab Coats of Arms with Shield

Coat of Arms House of Drăculești

Coat of Arms House of Dănești

== Legacy ==
The Basarab name is the origin of several place names, including the region of Bessarabia (today part of Moldova and Ukraine) and a few towns, such as Basarabi in Romania, Basarabeasca in the Republic of Moldova, and Basarbovo in Bulgaria.

As an eighth-generation descendant of Claudine Rhédey von Kis-Rhéde of Erdőszentgyörgy, Queen Elizabeth II of the United Kingdom can trace her lineage to Stanca, daughter of Mircea the Shepherd. Elizabeth was thus also a direct descendant of Vlad II Dracul.

== See also ==
- Dracula in popular culture
- Michael the Brave
- Anna Basarab
- List of titled noble families in the Kingdom of Hungary

== Sources ==
- Cazacu, Matei (2017). Dracula. Brill. ISBN 9789004349216.
- Grumeza, Ion (2010). The Roots of Balkanization: Eastern Europe C.E. 500-1500. University Press of America. ISBN 978-0-7618-5134-9.
- Rădvan, Laurențiu (2010). At Europe's Borders: Medieval Towns in the Romanian Principalities. Brill. ISBN 978-90-04-18010-9.
- Sedlar, Jean W (2011). East Central Europe in the Middle Ages, 1000-1500. University of Washington Press. ISBN 978-0-295-80064-6.
- Spinei, Victor (2009). The Romanians and the Turkic Nomads North of the Danube Delta from the Tenth to the Mid-Thirteenth century. Brill. ISBN 978-90-04-17536-5.
- Vásáry, István (2005). Cumans and Tatars: Oriental Military in the Pre-Ottoman Balkans, 1185–1365. Cambridge University Press. ISBN 0-521-83756-1.
