= Vladislav I of Wallachia =

Voivode of Wallachia between 1364 and 1377

- Voivode of Wallachia
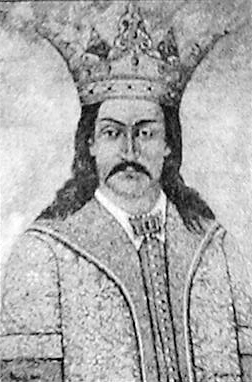

Voivode of Wallachia
- Reign: November 1364–1377
- Predecessor: Nicholas Alexander
- Successor: Radu I of Wallachia
- Died: 1377
- House: Basarab
- Father: Nicolae Alexandru

Vladislav I of Wallachia of the Basarab dynasty, also known as Vlaicu or Vlaicu-Vodă, was the Voivode of Wallachia between 1364 and 1377. He was the son of Nicholas Alexander of Wallachia and Clara Dobokai.

In February 1369, Vladislav I subdued Vidin and recognised Louis I of Hungary as his overlord, in return for Severin, Amlaș, Făgăraș and 120,000 ducats. In 1375, Louis I took Severin again, but Vladislav I recovered it, in 1376–1377.

== Family ==
Vladislav I was the son of Nicholas Alexander of Wallachia and Clara Dobokai. It has been suggested that his son was Vlad I of Wallachia.

== Reign ==
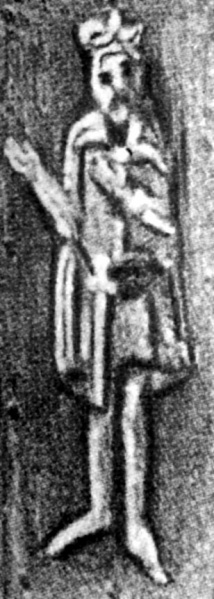
Vladislav Vlaicu's portrait on the frame of an icon gifted to the Great Lavra

During his reign, the Metropolis of Muntenia and Dobrudja was split in two parts, as a single bishop did not suffice for the entire country, thus creating the Metropolis of Oltenia. The first monasteries in Wallachia were erected by Nicodemus of Tismana (Vodița Monastery and Tismana Monastery) with the support of the voivode. Vlaicu also supported the community of Mount Athos. In particular, he offered a substantial donation to the Koutloumousiou Monastery and its abbot, Chariton of Imbros, in September 1369. The funds were used to expand the monastery and construct the main church which can be seen today.

=== Relations with the Hungarian Crown ===
Louis assembled his armies in Temesvár (now Timișoara in Romania) in February 1365. According to a royal charter that year, he was planning to invade Wallachia because the new voivode, Vladislav I, had refused to obey him. However, he ended up heading a campaign against the Bulgarian Tsardom of Vidin and its ruler Ivan Sratsimir, which suggests that Vladislav I had in the meantime yielded to him. Louis seized Vidin and imprisoned Ivan Stratsimir in May or June. In 1366, Louis granted the Banate of Severin and the district of Fogaras to Vladislav Vlaicu of Wallachia, who had accepted his suzerainty. In 1368, Vladislav I cooperated with Ivan Alexander of Bulgaria, the father of Ivan Sratsimir of Vidin, against the Hungarians. Their united armies imposed a blockade on the Hungarian-occupied Vidin.

Louis marched to the Lower Danube and ordered Nicholas Lackfi, Voivode of Transylvania, to invade Wallachia in the autumn of 1368. The voivode's army marched through the valley of the Ialomița River, but the Wallachians ambushed it and killed many Hungarian soldiers, including the voivode. Simultaneously, an army under Louis attempted an attack on Severin. Vlaicu and his army awaited him there. Louis either emerged victorious or suffered a defeat. Alongside these two actions, a Wallachian army group set out from Făgăraș, raiding its surroundings. After these victories, Vlaicu went on the offensive and captured Vidin in early 1369. During his brief occupation, he allowed the massacre of the Franciscans by the Greek missionaries and the locals. In the summer of 1369, Louis launched a successful campaign against Wallachia from the west and made Vladislav Vlaicu yield to him or managed to bring him to the negotiation table. In the ensuing negotiations, Louis restored Ivan Sratsimir in Vidin upon Vlaicu's initiative.

=== Clash with the Ottomans ===
Vladislav I Vlaicu is recorded to have participated, in person or not, in Christian coalitions against the Ottoman Turks during the 1360s, as per Ottoman chroniclers. Other sources, such as those from his chancellery in 1372 and from the Holy See by Pope Urban V in 1370, confirm that in 1369 Vladislav I fought a Turkish army allied with the Bulgarian tsar Ivan Alexander of Tarnovo, who wished to occupy the city of Vidin and attack Wallachia. The allied army was defeated, and the city of Nicopolis was, possibly, occupied for a short period by the Wallachian forces. With this victory, the Danubian border of Wallachia was secured from the Turks for almost two decades.

=== Coinage ===
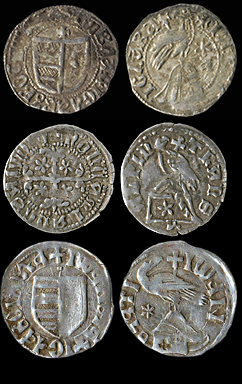
The 3 types of Wallachian ducats, from top to bottom in numerical order.

Vladislav I was the first Wallachian voivode to mint local coins around 1365. The coins were made exclusively from silver and they were classified in 3 categories:

- I - Ducats, with a diameter of 18-21 mm and an average weight of 1,05 grams. There were 3 types of the Wallachian ducats:
  - type I, which had solely Cyrillic inscriptions, featuring on the obverse the inscription +IWBЛAДICЛABABOEBWД and a shield with a cross on top divided into two halves vertically, one being traversed by horizontal stripes and the other featuring a crescent, while on the reverse featuring an eagle with the head tilted to the left sitting on a knightly helmet with a cross to its left;
  - type II, which had both Latin and Cyrillic inscriptions, featuring on the obverse the inscription +MLADIZLAIWAIWODE or +IWBЛAДICЛAB and a Jerusalem cross, while on the reverse featuring the inscription +TRANS-ALPIN or +IWBЛAДICЛAB BOE and the same model as type I, but mirrored;
  - type III, which, akin to type II had both Cyrillic and Latin inscriptions, featuring on the obverse the inscription +MLADIZLAIWAIWODE or +IWANABЛATICЛABOIBOДA and a shield divided into two halves vertically, one being traversed by horizontal stripes and the other being blank, while on the reverse featuring the inscription +TRANS-ALPINI or +IWAN-BЛATI and the same illustration as type II.
- II - Dinars, with a diameter of 16-18 mm and an average weight of 0,7 grams. They looked the same as type III ducats and also featured the same Cyrillic or Latin inscriptions, however they were smaller and lighter.
- III - Bans, with a diameter of 14-16 mm and an average weight of 0,35 grams. On the obverse, they featured the same imagery as type II and III ducats did on the reverse, with the exception of the inscription, which was Б-Л, while on the reverse they featured a Jerusalem cross.

== Bibliography ==
- Giurescu, Constantin C. (1946). Istoria Românilor: Din cele mai vechi timpuri până la moartea lui Alexandru cel Bun (1432) (in Romanian). Vol. I (Fifth ed.). București: Fundația Regală pentru Literatură și Artă (Royal Foundation for Literature and Art). p. 412. https://ia600502.us.archive.org/27/items/constantin-c.-giurescu-istoria-romanilor-vol.-i-ed.-5-1946/Constantin%20C.%20Giurescu%20-%20Istoria%20romanilor%20vol.%20I%20ed.5%20-%201946.pdf
- Constantinescu, Nicolae (1979). Vladislav I 1364-1377 (in Romanian). București: Editura Militară. https://dn760109.eu.archive.org/0/items/constantinescu-nicolae-vladislav-i-ctrl/Constantinescu%2C%20Nicolae%20-%20Vladislav%20I%20-%20ctrl.pdf
- Rezachevici, Constantin. (2001). Rolul românilor în apărarea Europei de expansiunea otomană. Secolele XIV-XV. Evoluția unui concept în contextul vremii (The role of the Romanians in defending Europe from Ottoman expansion. 14th-15th centuries. The evolution of a concept in the context of the time) (in Romanian). Bucharest. Editura Albatros. p. 134.
- (1986). Istoria Militară A Poporului Român (The Military History of the Romanian People). Vol. II. București: Editura Militară. https://archive.org/details/istoria-militara-a-poporului-roman-vol-2-1986 https://ia600907.us.archive.org/23/items/istoria-militara-a-poporului-roman-vol-2-1986/Istoria-Militara%CC%86-A-Poporului-Roma%CC%82n_Vol-2_1986.pdf
- Божилов, Иван (1994). "Иван Срацимир, цар във Видин (1352/1353 — 1396)". Фамилията на Асеневци (1186–1460). Генеалогия и просопография (in Bulgarian). София: Българска академия на науките. ISBN 954-430-264-6. OCLC 38087158.
- Czamańska, Ilona (1996). Mołdawia i Wołoszczyzna wobec Polski, Węgier i Turcji w XIV i XV wieku (in Polish). Poznań: Wydawnictwo Naukowe UAM. ISBN 83-232-0733-X.
- Engel, Pál (2001). The Realm of St Stephen: A History of Medieval Hungary, 895–1526. London: I.B. Tauris. ISBN 978-1-4175-4080-8. OCLC 56676014.
- Fine, John V. A. (1994) [1987]. The Late Medieval Balkans: A Critical Survey from the Late Twelfth Century to the Ottoman Conquest. Ann Arbor, Michigan: University of Michigan Press. ISBN 978-0-472-10079-8.
- Kristó, Gyula (1988). Az Anjou-kor háborúi [Wars in the Age of the Angevins] (in Hungarian). Zrínyi Kiadó. ISBN 9633269059.
- Lukács, Antál (1991). "O campanie angevină necunoscută din 1382". Anuarul Institutului de Istorie A.D. Xenopol (in Romanian). XXVIII. Iași: Editura Academei Române.
- Ioniță, Adrian; Kelemen, Beatrice; Simon, Alexandru (2017). AL WA: Prințul Negru al Vlahiei și vremurile sale [AL WA: The Black Prince of Wallachia and his times] (in Romanian). Cluj-Napoca: Academia Română - Centrul de Studii Transilvane, Editura Argonaut. ISBN 9786068694719 – via Academia.edu.
- Pop, Ioan-Aurel (2006). "Romanians in the 14th–16th Centuries: From the "Christian Republic" to the "Restoration of Dacia"". In Pop, Ioan-Aurel; Bolovan, Ioan (eds.). History of Romania: Compendium. Romanian Cultural Institute (Center for Transylvanian Studies). pp. 209–314. ISBN 978-973-7784-12-4. OCLC 123906375.
- Solymosi, László; Körmendi, Adrienne (1981). "A középkori magyar állam virágzása és bukása, 1301–1506 [The Heyday and Fall of the Medieval Hungarian State, 1301–1526]". In Solymosi, László (ed.). Magyarország történeti kronológiája, I: a kezdetektől 1526-ig [Historical Chronology of Hungary, Volume I: From the Beginning to 1526] (in Hungarian). Budapest: Akadémiai Kiadó. pp. 188–228. ISBN 978-963-05-2661-6. OCLC 313143718.
- Jambor, Petre (1979). "Nobilii de Dăbâca și relațiile cu Țara Românească în veacul al XIV-lea". Acta Musei Napocensis (in Romanian). XVI. Cluj-Napoca: Muzeul de Istorie al Transilvaniei.

Vladislav I of Wallachia House of Basarab Died: 1377
Regnal titles
Preceded by Nicolae Alexandru	Voivode of Wallachia; 1364 – c. 1377	Succeeded by Radu I
