= Michael Asen IV of Bulgaria =

Michael Asen IV
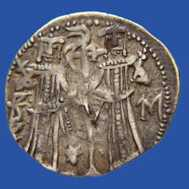
- Coin depicting Ivan Alexander and his son Michael Asen IV
- Born: 1322
- Died: 1355
- Spouse: Maria-Irene Palaiologina
- House: Sratsimir
- Father: Ivan Alexander
- Mother: Theodora

Michail Asen (Bulgarian: Михаил Асен) (c. 1322–1355) was the eldest son of Ivan Alexander of Bulgaria from his marriage with Theodora of Wallachia.

After his father acceded to the throne in 1331, the young prince was proclaimed co-Emperor. He was to succeed his father under the name Michael IV Asen. The heir to the throne was the pride of the royal family and was said to possess "all virtues". He married Maria, renamed Irina, the daughter of Andronikos III Palaiologos.

In 1354–1355 the Ottoman Turks invaded Bulgaria and headed towards Plovdiv and Sofia. It is mentioned in an anonymous Bulgarian chronicle that Michail Asen gathered the Bulgarians and engaged the Turks near Sofia. The Bulgarians suffered heavy casualties including Michail himself. But the battle was not in vain: the Ottomans failed to capture the cities and did not attack the country up to 1370. In the Bulgarian folklore is mentioned that the son of the Emperor perished with the death of the brave.

== Sources ==
- Andreev, Jordan (1993). Bǎlgarija prez vtorata četvǎrt na XIV v. (in Bulgarian). Veliko Tǎrnovo: Sv. Kliment Ohridski. OCLC 69163573.
