= Nicholas Alexander of Wallachia =

Voivode of Wallachia between 1352 and 1364

Nicolae Alexandru of Wallachia
- Voivode of Wallachia
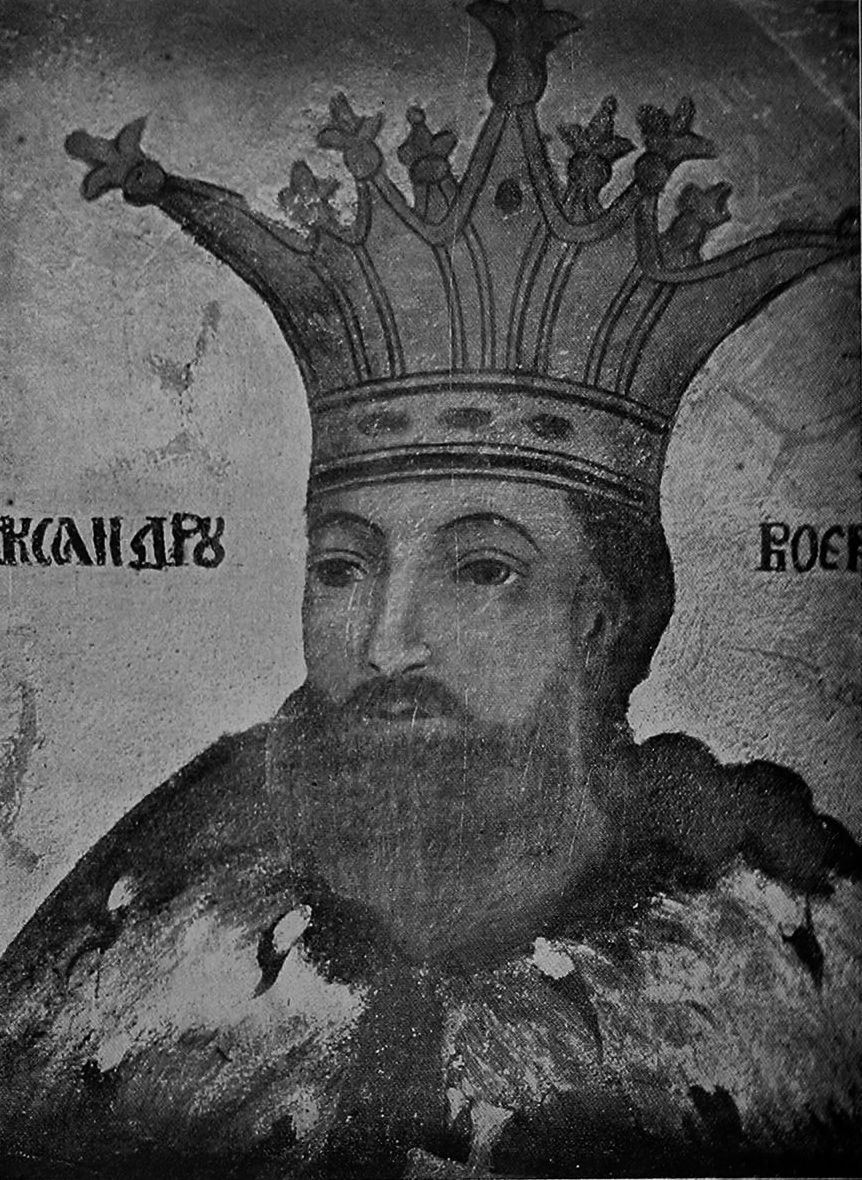

Voivode of Wallachia
- Reign: c. 1344 – 1352 (with Basarab I); 1352 – November 1364 (alone)
- Predecessor: Basarab I of Wallachia
- Successor: Vladislav I of Wallachia
- Died: November 1364
- Spouse: Doamna Maria Lackfy; Doamna Clara Dobokai; Doamna Margit Dabkai
- Issue: Vladislav I of Wallachia; Radu I of Wallachia; Elisabeth of Wallachia; Anna of Wallachia; Anca of Walachia
- House: Basarab
- Father: Basarab I of Wallachia
- Mother: Doamna Margareta

Nicholas Alexander (Romanian: Nicolae Alexandru c. 1300 – 16th November 1364) was the second Voivode of Wallachia. His birthdate is uncertain, although according to popular theory he was born around the turn of the 14th century. He co-ruled the principality with his father Basarab from 1344 until his father's death in 1351 or 1352; he then ruled alone until his death in 1364. He is best known for facilitating the founding of the Metropolis of Ungro-Wallachia.

== Reign ==
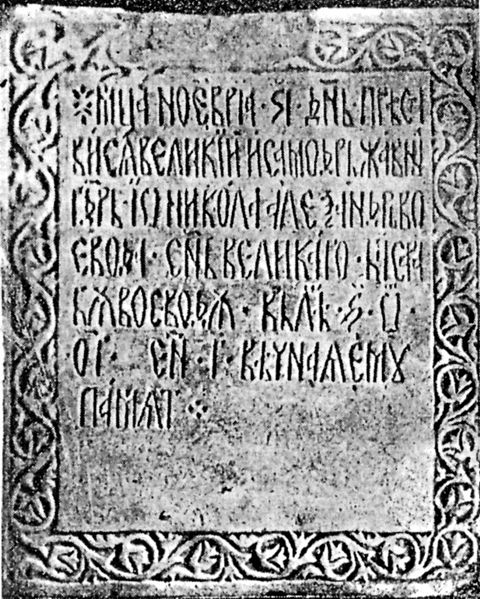
The tombstone of Nicholas Alexander

In the year 1359, he founded the Eastern Orthodox Metropolis of Ungro-Wallachia.

After initially resisting pressures to become the Kingdom of Hungary's vassal, he yielded to King Louis I in 1354 due to threat posed by the Golden Horde, and recognized the right of the Roman Catholic Church to establish missions in his principality, as well as the privilege of Saxon traders from Brașov to transit Wallachia without paying duties. In 1355, Nicolae Alexandru and the King of Hungary reached an agreement in return for Severin.

The Wallachian voivode renounced Hungarian suzerainty in 1359.

Nicholas Alexander died in 16 November 1364 and he was buried in Câmpulung. His epitaph reads:

In the 16th day of November died the great and sole ruler Io Nicholas Alexander voivode, son of great Basarab, in 6873 indiction 3. Memory eternal.

== Family ==
Firstly, he married Lady Maria, of the Lackfi family from Transylvania.The couple had two children:

- Prince Voislav ( d. January 1366)
- Princesa Elizabeth of Wallachia (1340– 1369), who married Duke of Opole Vladislaus II and had three daughters.

Through Elizabeth's youngest daughter, Katarina of Oppole, Nicolas Alexander become ancestor for all European royal families including Romanian royal family.

His second wife was Clara Dobokai, a Catholic noblewoman from Hungary. The marriage produced three children:

- Princess Ana of Wallachia, the Empress Consort of Bulgaria; married her cousin Tsar Ivan Sratsimir of Bulgaria and had three children, including the next tsar, Prince Constantine
- Voievode Radu I of Wallachia, succeeded his half brother Vladislav as voievode
- Princess Anna of Wallachia, the Empress Consort of Serbia; married Emperor Stefan Uroš V

The mother of Vladislav I of Wallachia may be Clara Dobokai.

== Bibliography ==
- (in Romanian) Constantin C. Giurescu, Istoria Românilor, vol. I, Ed. ALL Educațional, București, 2003.
- (in Romanian) Daniel Barbu, Sur le double nom du prince de Valachie Nicolas-Alexandre, Revue Roumaine d’Histoire XXV, no. 4, 1986.

Nicholas Alexander of Wallachia House of Basarab Died: 1364
Regnal titles
Preceded by Basarab I	Voivode of Wallachia; 1352–1364	Succeeded by Vladislav I
