= Ivan Sratsimir of Bulgaria =

Tsar of Bulgaria from 1356 to 1396

Ivan Stratsimir
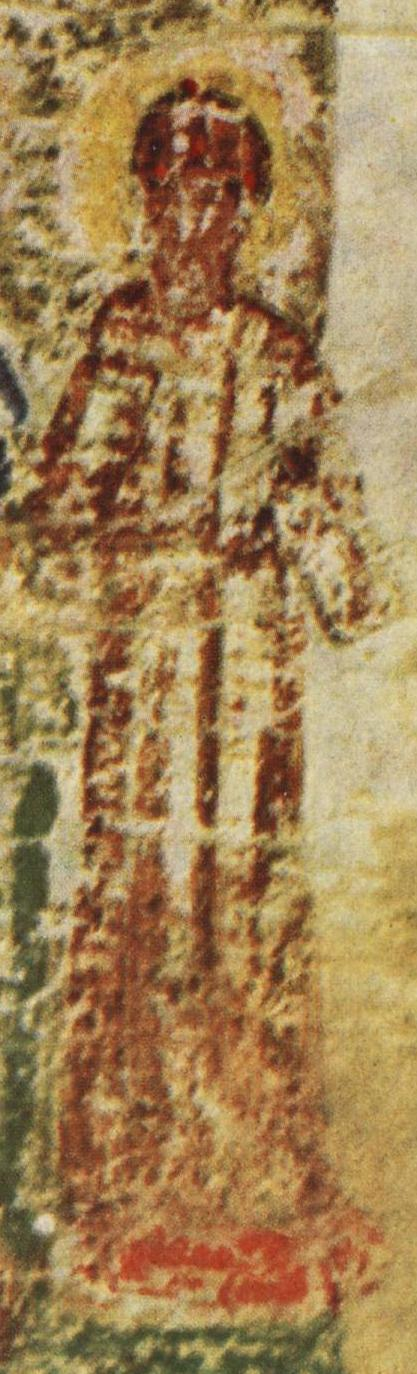
- Depiction of Ivan Sratsimir from a contemporary Bulgarian translation of the Manasses Chronicle

Tsar of Bulgaria
- Reign: 1356–1396
- Predecessor: Ivan Alexander
- Successor: Constantine II
- Born: 1324/1325; Lovech
- Died: 1397; Bursa, Ottoman Empire
- Spouse: Anna of Wallachia
- Issue: Dorothea, Queen of Bosnia; Constantine II, Tsar of Bulgaria
- House: Sratsimir
- Father: Ivan Alexander, Tsar of Bulgaria
- Mother: Theodora of Wallachia

Ivan Stratsimir (Bulgarian: Иван Страцимир), was emperor (tsar) of Bulgaria in Vidin from 1356 to 1396. He was born in 1324 or 1325, and he died in or after 1397. Despite being the eldest surviving son of Ivan Alexander, Ivan Stratsimir was disinherited in favour of his half-brother Ivan Shishman and proclaimed himself emperor in Vidin. When the Hungarians attacked and occupied his domains, he received assistance from his father and the invaders were driven away.

After the death of Ivan Alexander in 1371 Ivan Sratsimir broke off ties with Tarnovo and even placed the archbishop of Vidin under the jurisdiction of the Patriarchate of Constantinople to demonstrate his independence. Due to its geographical position, Vidin was initially safe from attacks by the Ottomans who were ravaging the Balkans to the south and Ivan Sratsimir made no attempts to assist Ivan Shishman in his struggle against the Ottomans. Only after the fall of Tarnovo in 1393 did his policy become more active and he eventually joined the crusade of the Hungarian king Sigismund. However, after the disastrous battle of Nicopolis in 1396, the Ottomans marched to Vidin and seized it. Ivan Sratsimir was captured and imprisoned in Bursa where he was probably strangled. Although his son Constantine II claimed the title Emperor of Bulgaria and at times controlled some parts of his father's realm, Ivan Sratsimir is generally regarded by historians as the last ruler of medieval Bulgaria.

Sratsimir Hill on Trinity Peninsula in Antarctica is named after him.

== Early life ==
Born in Lovech in 1324 or 1325, Ivan Sratsimir was the second son of Theodora and Ivan Alexander (r. 1331–1371), who was despot of Lovech at the time . Ivan Sratsimir was proclaimed co-emperor by his father in 1337 in his early teenage years, along with his brothers Michael Asen IV and Ivan Asen IV. This proved fatal for Bulgaria because the prerogatives of his sons' authority were not defined, leading to rivalry between the brothers. After his proclamation Ivan Sratsimir was given the rule of Vidin as an apanage, because his father wanted to have the different regions of the state under the direct rule of his family.

In the 1340s Ivan Sratsimir rose in prominence because he was married with Anna of Wallachia and already had children, while his eldest brother Michael Asen and his wife did not produce children for ten years. In 1352 Ivan Alexander introduced the title junior emperor in order to secure the smooth and secure transition of the throne and Ivan Sratsimir became known by that title. In the end of 1347 or in the beginning of 1348, however, Ivan Alexander divorced with his first wife and sent her to a monastery so he could marry the Jew Sarah-Theodora. That event spoiled the relations between Ivan Sratsimir and his father and the conflict deepened after the birth of Ivan Shishman to Ivan Alexander and Sarah-Theodora in 1350/1351. The conflict climaxed in 1355–1356 when the undisputed heir to the throne, Michael Asen IV, perished in battle against the Ottomans. According to the Majorat system, Ivan Sratsimir should have come next in the succession line but since Ivan Shishman was born in the purple, i.e. after his father was crowned, Ivan Alexander and Sarah-Theodora declared Ivan Shishman successor to the throne. A hint of the feud between father and son is the fact that the image of Ivan Sratsimir was not included in the Tetraevangelia of Ivan Alexander where the whole imperial family was pictured, including Ivan Alexander's son-in-law. That could mean either that Ivan Sratsimir was disinherited and proclaimed himself emperor in Vidin or that he was denied the title junior emperor and given the rule of Vidin as a compensation.

== Emperor in Vidin ==
=== Early reign and Hungarian invasion ===
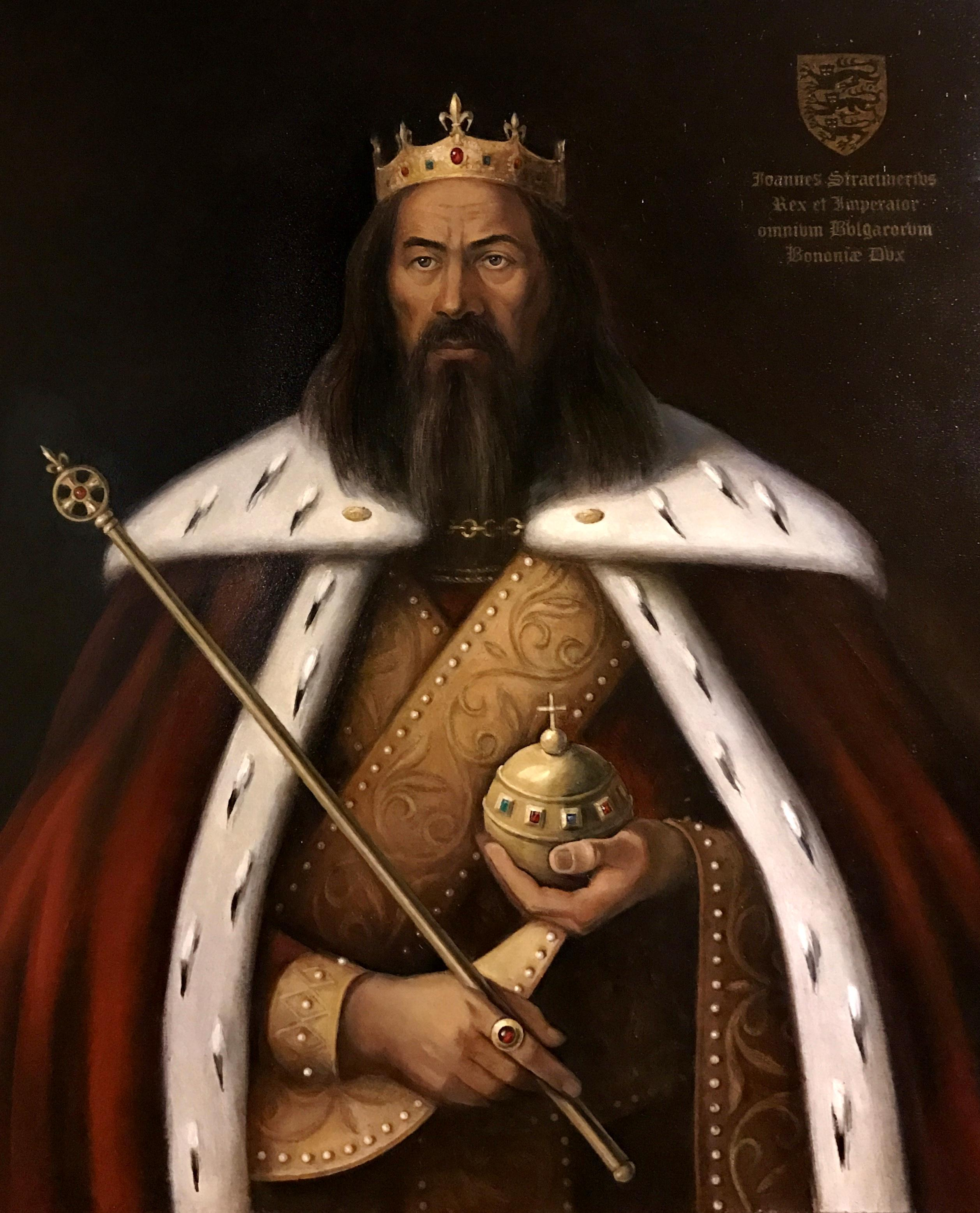
Imaginary portrait by an anonymous author, late 19th century

Ivan Sratsimir was proclaimed emperor in Vidin in 1356 and began to use the title Emperor of Bulgarians and Greeks, as his father. In order to secure the alliance of Wallachia, he married his first cousin Anna, the daughter of the Wallachian voivode Nicholas Alexander, in 1356 or 1357, a move that was probably arranged with the help of Ivan Sratsimir's mother Theodora as a reaction to the actions of Ivan Alexander.

He ruled with the tacit consent of his father for around ten years until 1365 when the Hungarian king Louis I, who styled himself King of Bulgaria among the other titles, demanded that Ivan Sratsimir acknowledge his suzerainty and become his vassal. When the Bulgarian ruler refused, Louis I marched from Hungary on 1 May 1365 and captured Vidin on 2 June after a brief siege. The rest of the Vidin Tsardom was conquered in the next three months. Ivan Sratsimir and his family were captured and taken to the castle of Humnik in Croatia and the region of Vidin was placed under direct Hungarian rule governed through a Ban appointed by the King of Hungary. Ivan Sratsimir spent four years in honorary Hungarian captivity and he and his family were forced to accept Catholicism. The Hungarians also sent Franciscan friars to convert the population of the Vidin Tsardom to Catholicism. Although the Hungarian accounts boasted that the Franciscans converted 200,000 people or a third of the region's population, this move brought great discontent among the Bulgarian population and eventually failed. That was in fact the first forceful conversion in the country after the Christianization of Bulgaria five centuries earlier. In a contemporary book, a monk wrote:

This book was written by the sinful and unintelligent Dragan together with his brother Rayko in the days when the Hungarians ruled Vidin and it was great pain for the people at that time.

Initially Ivan Alexander, who was still nominally the rightful ruler of Vidin, did not take active measures for its recovery, although his refusal to give safe conduct to the Byzantine emperor John V Palaiologos who was returning to Constantinople from Western Europe was explained by the deterioration of the Bulgarian–Hungarian relations. By 1369, however, he organised an Orthodox anti catholic-Hungarian coalition for the liberation of Vidin with the participation of the Wallachian voivode Vladislav I Vlaicu and despot Dobrotitsa. The allied campaign was a success and after it was supported by a popular uprising in Vidin against the Catholic clergy and the Hungarian authority, Louis I had to give up his claims and restore Ivan Sratsimir to the throne in Vidin in the autumn of 1369. According to historian J. Fine, Ivan Sratsimir was allowed to return to Vidin by Louis I as a Hungarian vassal because of his popularity among the population and because Ivan Sratsimir used the Hungarian patronage to assert independence from his father and later to resist his brother in Tarnovo.

=== Reign after 1371 ===
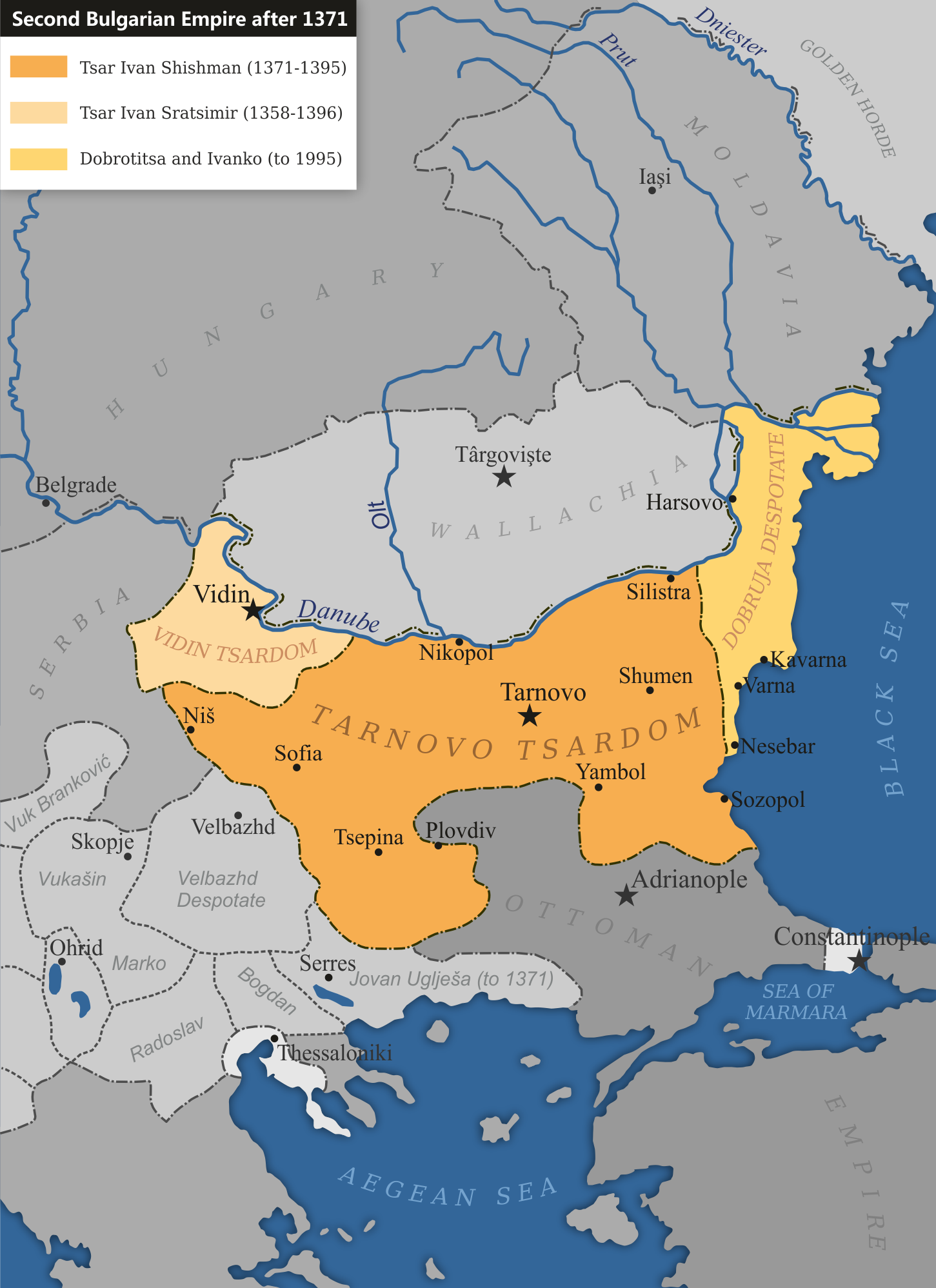
The Second Bulgarian Empire after the death of Ivan Alexander. Ivan Sratsimir controlled Vidin to the north-west, his brother Ivan Shishman the central regions and despot Dobrotitsa controlled the coast to the east.

After the death of emperor Ivan Alexander on 17 February 1371, Ivan Sratsimir broke off the last links that connected Tarnovo and Vidin and began to rule without even nominal acknowledgement to the authorities in Tarnovo. He was since styled, as written in the accounts of the Patriarchate of Constantinople: "How should the Patriarch and the Archbishop write to ruler of Vidin and emperor Kamtsimir (Sratsimir): Most Faithful and Allmighty ruler of Vidin the whole of Bulgaria..." The authority of Ivan Sratsimir was treated as equal to that of Ivan Shishman and the details suggest that he was even presented as a senior ruler. Due to the insufficient information, some early Bulgarian historians such as Konstantin Jireček supported the hypothesis that Ivan Sratsimir and Ivan Shishman were engaged in a military conflict over Sofia but the idea has been dismissed by most modern historians. In fact, despite the rivalry, the brothers scrupulously maintained relations until 1381 and Ivan Sratsimir was even considered as a potential successor by Ivan Shishman. However, J. Fine suggests that immediately after the death of his father, Ivan Sratsimir tried to seize the control over the whole of Bulgaria for himself and even captured and held Sofia for a year or two, which led to permanent hostility between the two brothers and spoiled any chances for a common Bulgarian resistance against the Ottomans.

The relations between the two Bulgarian states worsened in 1381 when Ivan Sratsimir broke the connections with the Bulgarian Patriarchate in Tarnovo and instead placed the Archbishopric of Vidin under the jurisdiction of the Ecumenical Patriarchate of Constantinople. That decision was a demonstration of the independence of Vidin from Tarnovo but did not lead to open conflict between the two. The hostility between Ivan Sratsimir and Ivan Shishman remained on the eve of the Ottoman invasion. Most historians agree that in the 1370s and the early 1380s, Vidin was still away from the route of the Ottoman campaigns and was not endangered. During and after the massive Ottoman invasion in north-eastern Bulgaria in 1388, sources suggest that relations between the two brothers were uneasy. As a result of the Ottoman success in the 1388 campaign and the resulting changes of the balance of power, Ivan Sratsimir had to become an Ottoman vassal and to accept an Ottoman garrison in Vidin. Ivan Sratsimir remained inactive while the Ottomans destroyed the remains of the Tarnovo Tsardom – Tarnovo fell in 1393 and Ivan Shishman was killed in 1395. In 1396 Ivan Sratsimir joined the Christian crusade organised by the Hungarian king Sigismund. When the crusader army reached Vidin the Bulgarian ruler opened the gates and surrendered the Ottoman garrison. The Ottoman garrison of Oryahovo tried to resist but the local Bulgarians managed to capture it. However, the Christian army suffered a heavy defeat on 25 September in the battle of Nicopolis and the victorious Ottoman sultan Bayezid I immediately marched to Vidin and seized it by the end of 1396 or the beginning of 1397. Ivan Sratsimir was captured and imprisoned in the Ottoman capital Bursa where he was probably strangled.

== Culture, economy and religion ==
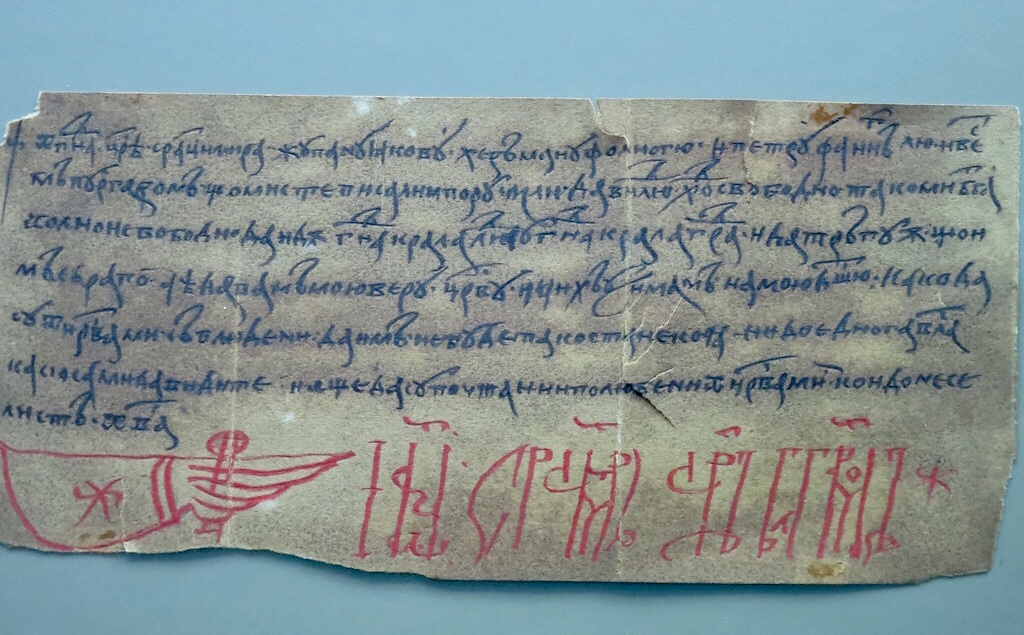
Brasov Charter of tsar Ivan Stratsimir

Along with Tarnovo, during the rule of Ivan Sratsimir Vidin emerged as a major literary center, under the strong influence of the Tarnovo Literary School. Some of the works that have survived from that period include the Tetraevangelia of the Metropolitan Danail and the Vidin collection from 1360, ordered by Empress Anna, which contains the hagiographies of thirteen Orthodox saints and a description of the holy sites in Jerusalem. Joasaph of Bdin, who was elected Archbishop of Vidin in 1392 wrote Praising epistle for the movement of St Philotea relics from Tarnovo to Vidin which contained all features of the Tarnovo Literary School. Joasaph also demonstrated great respect to Patriarch Evtimiy of Tarnovo, the most prominent figure in the Bulgarian cultural and literary life in the second half of the 14th century.

In the late 1360s, the region of Vidin resisted the forceful conversion to Catholicism undertaken by the Hungarian authorities and remained Orthodox. The subjugation of Vidin to the Patriarchate of Constantinople in 1381 led to a conflict with the Patriarchate of Tarnovo but after the fall of Tarnovo and the dissolution of the Bulgarian Patriarchate, Ivan Sratsimir tried to negotiate with the Ottomans to place some of the former eparchies of Tarnovo in his jurisdiction. In 1395 he sent there a delegation led by the heir to the throne Constantine and Joasaph of Bdin to bring the relics of Saint Philotea to Vidin. According to Joasaph the mission was successful and the relics remained in Vidin for the next two centuries. However, he does not mention the diplomatic results.

Ivan Sratsimir began to mint his own coinage to show his legitimacy as early as the 1360s. The abundance of coin treasure troves found in the territory of the Tsardom of Vidin is an indication of the wealth and the well-developed trade in the region during the second half of the 14th century. The Brașov Charter, the only surviving document made by Ivan Sratsimir, grants the merchants of the Transylvanian town of Brașov free access and the right to trade in his realm.

== Family ==
Nothing is known about Ivan Stratsimir's first wife and children apart from their existence. Ivan Sratsimir married for a second time to his first cousin, Anna of Wallachia, a daughter of his uncle Nicholas Alexander of Wallachia, and had at least three children:

- Princess Dorothea (Doroslava), married Ban Tvrtko I of Bosnia and became the first Queen of Bosnia.
- Tsar Constantine II of Bulgaria succeeded his father as the next Emperor of Bulgaria.
- Unnamed daughter, who died young at the court of Elizabeth of Poland.

Family tree of the Shishman dynasty

Shishman married to Unknown
Michael Shishman (r. 1323–1330) married to 1. Anna Neda 2. Theodora Palaiologina	Belaur	Keratsa Petritsa, married to despot Sratsimir
1. Ivan Stephen; (r. 1330–1331)	1. Shishman	1. Michael, married to unknown	1. Ludovik	2. Unknown
Ivan Alexander (r. 1331–1371) married to 1. Theodora Besarab 2. Sarah-Theodora	John Komnenos Asen married to 1. Unknown 2. Anna Palaiologina	Michael married to unknown	Helena married to Stefan Dushan (r. 1331–1355)	Theodora
Alexander Komnenus Asen, Xenia Ivanina Komnena	Shishman
1. Michael IV Asen married to Irina Palaiologina	1. Ivan Sratsimir; (r. 1356–1396) married to Anna	1. Ivan Asen IV	1. Kera Tamara married to Constantine Murad I (r. 1362–1389)	2. Keratsa-Maria married to Andronikos IV Palaiologos (r. 1376–1379)	2. Ivan Shishman; (r. 1371–1395) married to 1. Kira Maria 2. Dragana	2. Ivan Asen V	2. Desislava	2. Vasilisa
Constantine II (r. 1397–1422)	Dorothea married to Tvrtko I (r. 1353-1391)	Unknown daughter	John VII Palaiologos (r. 1390)	2 unknown daughters	Alexander	Fruzhin married to unknown	Keratsa	4 unknown; Patriarch Joseph II possible illegitimate son
Shishman	2 unknown

== Footnotes ==
=== Notes ===
a: The numbers designate which wife each child was born to.

== Sources ==
=== References ===
- Андреев (Andreev), Йордан (Jordan); Лалков, Милчо (Milcho Lalkov) (1996). Българските ханове и царе (The Bulgarian Khans and Tsars) (in Bulgarian). Велико Търново (Veliko Tarnovo): Абагар (Abagar). ISBN 954-427-216-X.
- Андреев, Йордан; Лазаров, Иван; Павлов, Пламен (1999). Кой кой е в средновековна България [Who is Who in Medieval Bulgaria] (in Bulgarian). Петър Берон. ISBN 978-954-402-047-7.
- Вожилов (Bozhilov), Иван (Ivan); Гюзелев, Васил (1999). История на средновековна България VII-XIV век (History of Medieval Bulgaria 7th-14th centuries) (in Bulgarian). София (Sofia): Анубис (Anubis). ISBN 954-426-204-0.
- Вожилов (Bozhilov), Иван (Ivan) (1994). Фамилията на Асеневци (1186–1460). Генеалогия и просопография (The House of Asen (1186-1460). Genealogy and Prosopography.) (in Bulgarian). София (Sofia): Българска академия на науките (Bulgarian Academy of Sciences). ISBN 954-430-264-6.
- Fine, J. (1987). The Late Medieval Balkans, A Critical Survey from the Late Twelfth Century to the Ottoman Conquest. The University of Michigan Press. ISBN 0-472-10079-3.
- Георгиева (Georgieva), Цветана (Tsvetana); Генчев, Николай (Nikolay Genchev) (1999). История на България XV-XIX век (History of Bulgaria 15th-19th centuries) (in Bulgarian). София (Sofia): Анубис (Anubis). ISBN 954-426-205-9.
- Иречек (Jireček), Константин (Konstantin) (1978). "XXIII Завладяване на България от турците (Conquest of Bulgaria by the Turks)". In Петър Петров (ed.). История на българите с поправки и добавки от самия автор (History of the Bulgarians with corrections and additions by the author) (in Bulgarian). София (Sofia): Издателство Наука и изкуство.

Regnal titles
Preceded by Ivan Alexander	Emperor of Bulgaria; 1356–1396	Succeeded by Constantine II
