= Michael Csetneki =

Hungarian nobleman

Michael (I) Csetneki

Master of the stewards alongside George Csetneki
- Reign: 1388
- Predecessor: George Csetneki
- Successor: George Csetneki
- Died: 25 September 1396; Battle of Nicopolis
- Noble family: House of Csetneki
- Spouses: 1, Margaret Serkei; 2, Clara Zsámboki
- Father: Ákos Csetneki

Michael (I) Csetneki (Hungarian: Csetneki (I.) Mihály; died 25 September 1396) was a Hungarian lord in the late 14th century, who served as Master of the stewards in 1388.

== Career ==
Michael (I) was born into the Csetneki family, which originated from the gens (clan) Ákos and held possessions mainly in Gömör County. His father was Ákos, who appears in contemporary records from 1342 to 1367.

Michael is first mentioned by sources in 1370. He was a confidant of Louis I of Hungary during the latter's last regnal years. Michael, together with his cousins, was granted ius gladii over the subjects in their estates in 1378. Following the death of Louis in 1382, the Csetnekis supported his daughter Mary, Queen of Hungary and her mother Elizabeth of Bosnia during the internal conflict against Charles III of Naples. In April 1386, Michael and his second cousin George were granted landholdings in Pest County for their faithful services by Mary. Following the capture of the queen, they swore allegiance to Sigismund, her husband. George and Michael took part in Sigismund's campaign into Croatia and they were present in the siege of Novigrad Castle, where the royal troops liberated Mary in June 1387.

For their former services to Louis I and Mary, George and Michael were granted the royal castle of Szanda with its accessories – portions in Surány, Szanda and Bolhádalja, along with a custom in the village Guta – in Nógrád County by Sigismund in November 1387. By that time, Michael was a member of the royal household and he was styled as relator in December 1387, during a royal audience. A single source from June 1388 also refers to Michael as Master of the stewards, while George held this position throughout from 1387 to 1396. In the document, Sigismund instructed Emeric Perényi to pay Michael 100 florins, for participating in the royal campaigns at his own expense. George and Michael were granted the castle of Saskő (today ruins near Šášovské Podhradie, Slovakia) from Sigismund in 1396.

Michael married first to Margaret Serkei, the daughter of Judge royal John Serkei. Following her death, he married Clara Zsámboki, the daughter of Master of the treasury John Zsámboki, and thus a granddaughter of Palatine Nicholas Zsámboki.

Michael Csetneki took part in the Hungarian–Ottoman War (1389–1396). He was killed in the Battle of Nicopolis on 25 September 1396, leaving no male descendants. His distant relatives, the Bebek family arbitrarily seized all of his possessions, including the castle of Kövi. His second cousins, Ladislaus (IV), Nicholas (V) and John (III) complained to the royal court against this in August 1401. Following Michael's death, his relatives were unable to pay the dowry of his widow Clara, thus they were forced to pledge their portions in Tapolca (Kunova Teplica), Szalóc (Slavec) and Ardó (Ardovo) in November 1401.

== Sources ==
- Engel, Pál (1996). Magyarország világi archontológiája, 1301–1457, I. [Secular Archontology of Hungary, 1301–1457, Volume I] (in Hungarian). História, MTA Történettudományi Intézete. ISBN 963-8312-44-0.
- Krantzieritz, Károly (2015). "A nikápolyi csata magyar résztvevői [Hungarian participants of the Battle of Nicopolis]". Hadtörténelmi Közlemények (in Hungarian). 128 (1). Hadtörténeti Intézet és Múzeum: 162–183. ISSN 0017-6540.
- Tihányiová, Monika (2022). A Csetnekiek. Kultúrtörténeti és gazdaságtörténeti barangolások Felső-Gömörben [The Csetnekis. Cultural and Economic Historical Walking Tours in Upper Gemer] (in Hungarian). Translated by Padlovics, Ágnes. Martin Opitz Kiadó. ISBN 978-615-6388-09-4.

Michael I House of Csetneki Born: ? Died: 25 September 1396
Political offices
Preceded by George Csetneki	Master of the stewards alongside George Csetneki; 1388	Succeeded by George Csetneki
