= Ladislaus Csetneki =

Hungarian prelate

Ladislaus (IV) Csetneki
- Bishop-elect of Nyitra
- Installed: 1439
- Term ended: 1448
- Predecessor: Dénes Szécsi
- Successor: Nicholas Zeleméri
- Other posts: Archdeacon of Hont; Archdeacon of Gömör; Provost of Szentgyörgymező; Lord Chancellor of the Queen

Personal details
- Died: 1450
- Denomination: Roman Catholic
- Parents: Ladislaus II Csetneki; Helena Szalonnai
- Education: University of Vienna
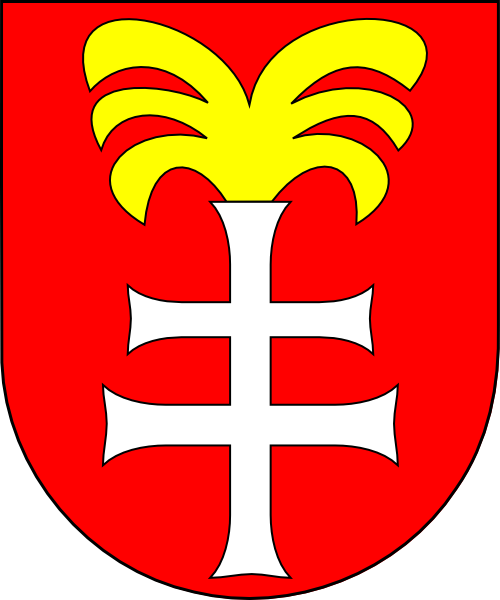
- Coat of arms

Ladislaus (IV) Csetneki (Hungarian: Csetneki (IV.) László; died 1450) was a Hungarian prelate in the first half of the 15th century, who served as Bishop-elect of Nyitra (present-day Nitra, Slovakia) from 1439 to 1448.

== Family ==
Ladislaus (IV) was born into the Csetneki family, which originated from the gens (clan) Ákos and possessed landholdings mainly in Gömör County. His parents were Ladislaus (II) Csetneki and Helena Szalonnai. He had three brothers – Nicholas (V), John (III) and Sigismund (I) – and a sister, Elizabeth.

Both Nicholas and John entered the service of King Sigismund as members of the royal household. Later, as a courtier of Queen Barbara of Cilli, John served as castellan of Ajnácskő (present-day ruins near Hajnáčka, Slovakia), being appointed to the position in July 1434. Their only sister Elizabeth married John Kazai from the gens (clan) Rátót.

== Early career ==
According to a charter from 1373, a certain Damian from Csetnek (present-day Štítnik, Slovakia) functioned as tutor of the still minor children of Ladislaus (II), implying that Ladislaus (IV) was still alive by that time. Ladislaus, as possibly the youngest one among their brothers, entered ecclesiastical career. In this capacity, he attended the faculty of humanities at the University of Vienna, where he enrolled in April 1393. His name is mentioned as "Ladislaus de Kethnik" in the university document.

Returning home, his name first appears in contemporary Hungarian records in July 1396, when, together with his brothers John and Nicholas and cousins George and Michael, requested the cathedral chapter of Nyitra to confirm their ownership over their lands in order to eliminate the claims of their relatives, the powerful Bebek family. He is referred to as a canon of the cathedral chapter of Esztergom in 1397, appointed by Pope Boniface IX in May of that year. He served as archdeacon of Hont from 1399 to 1404. He belonged to the lesser nobility at that time; alongside his brothers, Ladislaus was unable to pay the dowry of Clara Zsámboki, the widow of Michael, thus they were forced to pledge their portions in Tapolca (Kunova Teplica), Szalóc (Slavec) and Ardó (Ardovo) in November 1401. Prior to that, they also complained that the Bebeks arbitrarily seized all of Michael's possessions, including the castle of Kövi. In July 1402, they also pledged estates to their cousin George, who was dying, for 50 florins. Nicholas, John and Ladislaus again complained in March 1404 that the Bebeks unlawfully seized large amount of their inherited domains. In 1406 or 1407, Ladislaus was elected archdeacon of Gömör, succeeding Nicholas Alcsebi. In this capacity, Archbishop John Kanizsai instructed him to collect tithes in Gömör County in April 1407.

== Sigismund's diplomat ==
Ladislaus elevated into the position of provost of the Saint George collegiate chapter in Esztergom (and thus archdeacon of the cathedral chapter too) by early 1408. He held the dignity until July 1424. The Csetnekis' dispute with the Bebeks continued regarding the possessions rights over the ore mines and hammer mills in that period. Ladislaus became a skilled diplomat in the royal court of King Sigismund in these years, which resulted in the increase of his family's political influence. In his June 1424 charter, the king emphasized that Ladislaus Csetneki was appointed provost "at a very old age" and he "abounded in faith, an honest life, excellent knowledge, diverse virtues, talents and merits, as well as experience in mental and physical activity". His three brothers – Nicholas, John and Sigismund – served as courtly knights in the royal household; during the tensions emerged between Hungary and Poland, their 40-member lanced troops were assigned to the northern border of the realm, where they stationed at Késmárk (today Kežmarok, Slovakia). They were among the many nobles who ratified the Treaty of Lubowla in 1412.

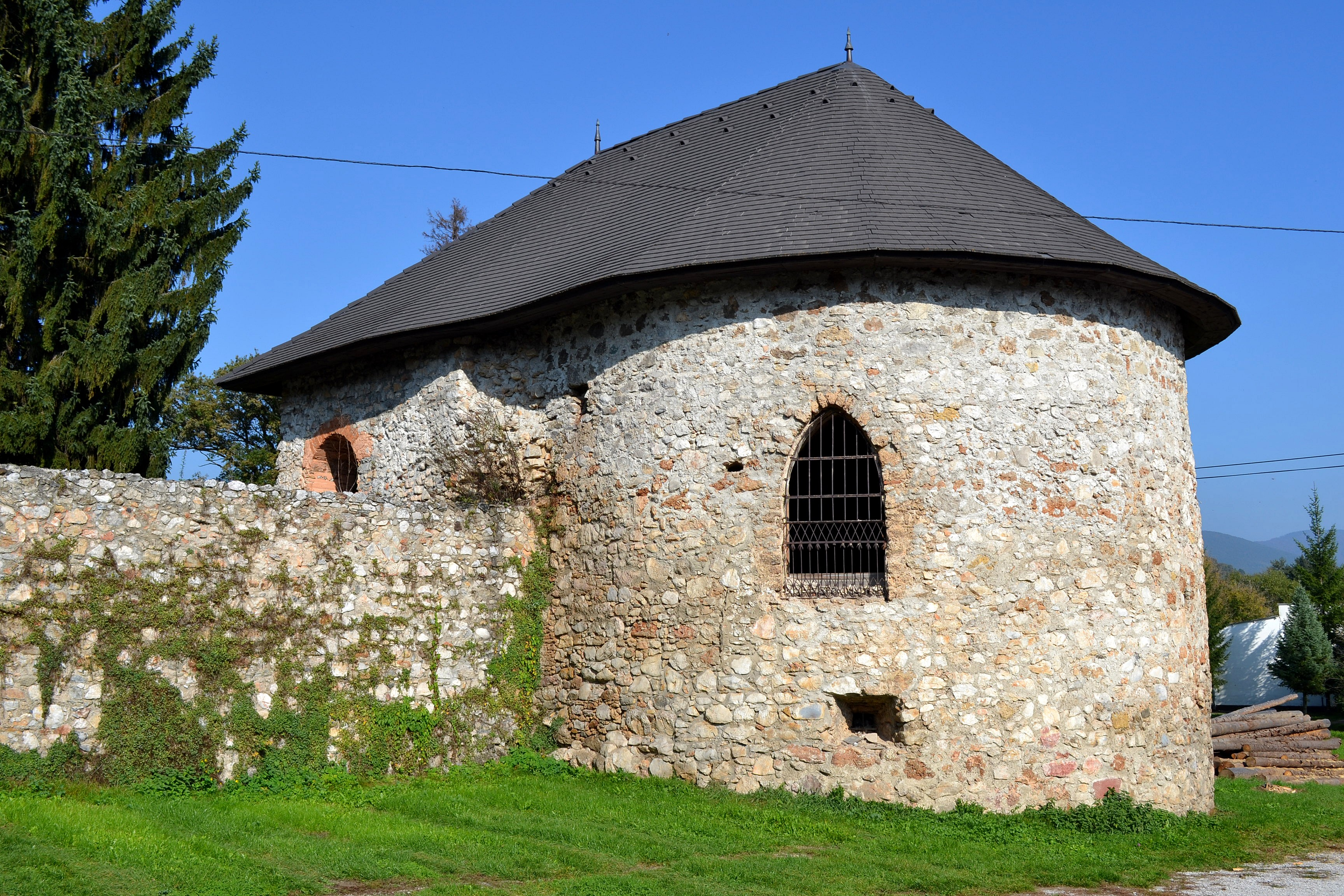
Preserved medieval part of water castle in Štítnik

On behalf of Sigismund, Ladislaus mediated a truce between the Republic of Venice and Frederick IV, Duke of Austria at Merano, Tyrol in August 1413. His presence proved that he escorted Sigismund into his journey to Northern Italy in that year. He was present when Sigismund negotiated with Antipope John XXIII in Lodi in November 1413 to obtain a promise that a council should be called in Constance to the next year to settle the Western Schism. Ladislaus was styled as vice-chancellor of Sigismund's German (Roman) court (Latin: aule regie maiestatis Romanorum vicecancellarius) in 1414. In this capacity, he attended the Council of Constance staying there for the upcoming years. Duke Albert V of Austria, Sigismund's future son-in-law, appointed Ladislaus as a chaplain of his ducal court in March 1416. For his merit, King Sigismund, who was in Constance at that time, donated to Ladislaus and his brothers a right to hold annual fairs for three different church holidays in their residence Csetnek in July 1417. They were granted the same privilege regarding their estate Dobsina (present-day Dobšiná, Slobakia) for a single holiday a month later, in August 1417.

Following the death of John Kanizsai in 1418, a five-year vacancy occurred in the archiepiscopal see of Esztergom. Replacing conservator Stephen Kanizsai, the late archbishop's brother, Sigismund appointed grand provost Peter Csehi and archdeacon Ladislaus Csetneki as joint governors (gubernator) of the archdiocese in May 1419. They appear in this position in February 1420. They held it until early May 1420, when Pope Martin V appointed Georg von Hohenlohe, the Bishop of Passau as administrator of the Archdiocese of Esztergom. King Sigismund appointed Ladislaus as the governor of the Stephanite and Knights Hospitaller's monasteries in Esztergom and Budafelhévíz, respectively, on 15 June 1424. He also became custodian and pastor of the royal chapel of Buda with this appointment. Hungarian historian Ede Reiszig considered that Ladislaus was perhaps a member of the Knights Hospitaller prior to that, but left the chivalric order due to their involvement in the anti-Sigismund rebellions. As governor of the aforementioned monasteries, Ladislaus played a key role in the settlement of the order's property relations, primarily for the benefit of the royal treasury. Under his guardianship, several landholdings had escheated to the crown. Ladislaus held this position until 1439. He resided in the Hungarian capital frequently after he bought a manor in Óbuda for himself and the Csetneki family in 1427.

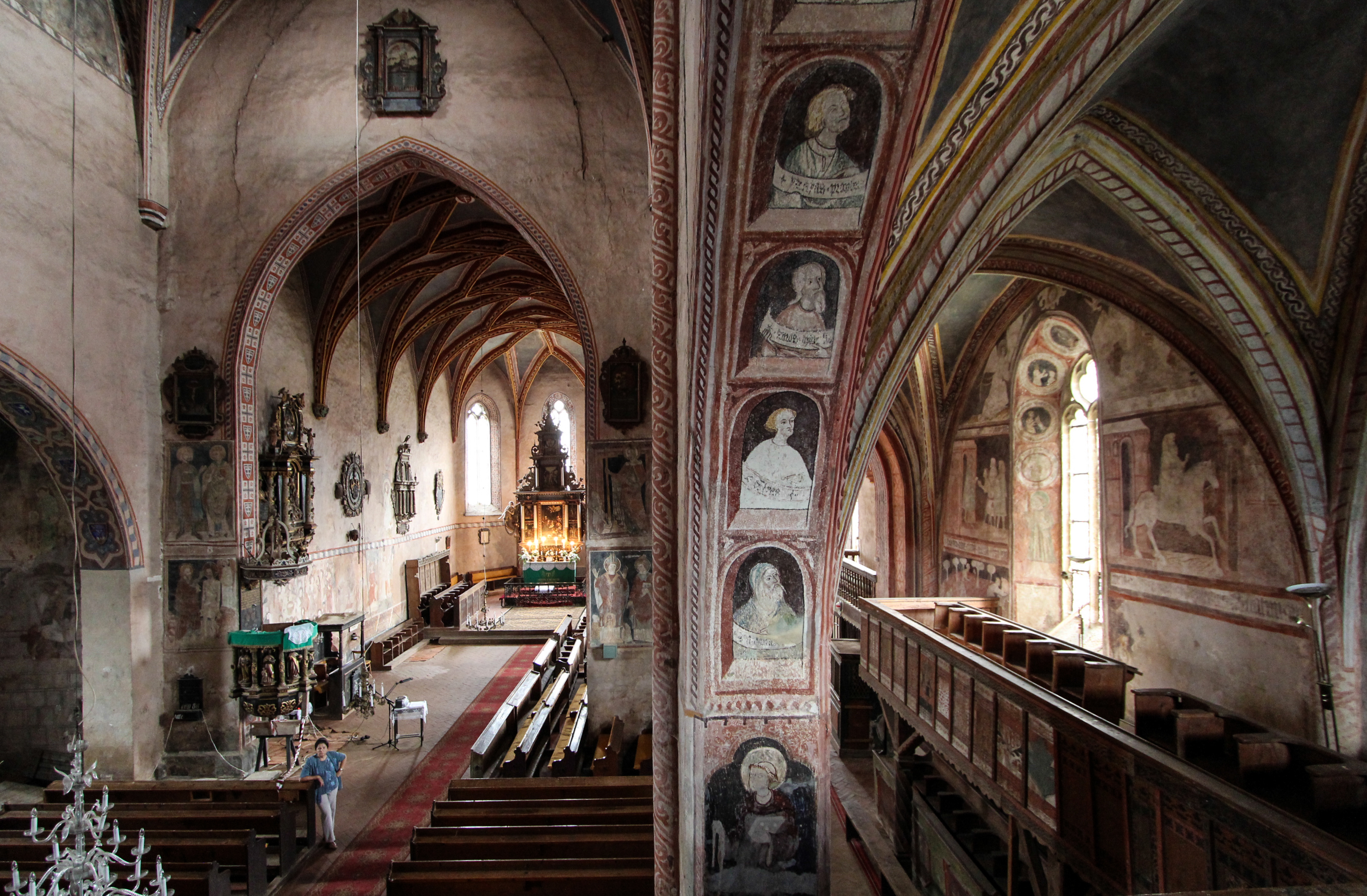
Interior of the church of Štítnik

Sigismund, using his sovereignty of ius supremi patronatus, decided in 1427 that Ladislaus Csetneki should be appointed to any bishopric or archbishopric that first became vacant (except for the see of Esztergom). The king also permitted Ladislaus and his brothers to build a castle in their main residence Csetnek in 1432. Under Ladislaus, the parish church of Csetnek underwent a major renovation since the mid-1410s, continuing the work of his late cousin George. The three-aisled structure of the church was completed in these years. Ladislaus personally selected the liturgical scenes depicted in the frescoes. His goal was to rebuild the parish church into a basilica in the grand style, based on royal examples in Hungary and Austria, but this ultimately remained incomplete. The simultaneous expansion and construction of the church and castle placed a great burden on the family, which was hampered by the subsequent turbulent period (see below). The construction of the planned northern burial chapel was also not completed.

Since the mid-1420s, Ladislaus became a confidant of Queen Barbara of Cilli, the second spouse of Sigismund. In 1426, she entrusted the clergyman to collect the New Year's gifts from the burghers of Pressburg (present-day Bratislava, Slovakia). Ladislaus handed over his own seal to the queen during issuing a charter in 1428. Ladislaus was first styled as (lord) chancellor of the queenly court in April 1430. His deputy was vice-chancellor Wenceslaus. In this capacity, he escorted Sigismund to the Holy Roman Empire and Italy from 1431 to 1433, which resulted the imperial coronation of Sigismund. In August 1433, Ladislaus stayed in Rome, when requested Pope Eugene IV to grant indulgence to those subjects who went on a pilgrimage to one of the seven churches founded by his late father around Csetnek. While serving as chancellor, his brother John also entered the service of Queen Barbara and functioned as castellan of Ajnácskő in 1434. Ladislaus held the dignity of queenly chancellor until the end of 1437, when Sigismund died.

== Bishop ==
Ladislaus Csetneki retained his influence in the royal court, when Albert succeeded his father-in-law as King of Hungary in late 1437. Albert, fulfilling the aforementioned wish of the late Sigismund, appointed him Bishop of Nyitra. Ladislaus, who succeeded Dénes Szécsi, is first mentioned in this capacity in July 1439. In the same period, he also functioned briefly as administrator of the Archdiocese of Esztergom following the death of George Pálóci. In this capacity, he pledged the local tithe to the burghers of Pressburg for 4,000 golden florins. As a confidant of the royal couple, Ladislaus served as a chaplain of Queen Elizabeth of Luxembourg until 1442. Since the Roman Curia did not acknowledge the supremacy of the Hungarian royal over ecclesiastical affairs, Pope Eugene IV did not confirm Ladislaus' appointment and he was styled as only bishop-elect throughout his episcopal reign.

Following the death of Albert in late 1439, a civil war broke out in Hungary, during which Ladislaus supported the aspirations of Elizabeth in the name of her infant son Ladislaus the Posthumous against the partisans of Vladislaus I. In August 1440, the bishop instructed his castellan Lawrence Lucskai to hand over the episcopal fort of Nyitra to the mercenaries of Elizabeth. In accordance with the contract, Ladislaus handed over the castle for three years, for which Elizabeth promised 3,000 golden florins, to be paid in three installments. The queen's mercenary leader John Jiskra of Brandýs took over the command and defense of the castle against the plundering attacks of the pro-Vladislaus neighbors. Ladislaus, however, did not get the castle back even after the parties reached an agreement in 1445, and Nyitra became one of the strongholds of Jiskra's Hussites in Upper Hungary. The bishop accused castellan George Szalonnai that he did not try to regain the castle for the bishopric. Archbishop Dénes Szécsi also appointed his own castellan Gregory Majtényi, who unlawfully seized the bishopric's lands and revenues according to the complaint of Ladislaus in 1445 and 1447. Ladislaus was among those prelates and barons who negotiated in Zsámbék in December 1445 and announced the convocation of the Diet of Hungary to February 1446.

In the autumn of 1447, a group of canons elected Nicholas Zeleméri as Bishop of Nyitra. Pope Nicholas V confirmed the election on 15 January 1449, invalidating Ladislaus' royal appointment, who is last mentioned in this capacity in June 1448. Ladislaus Csetneki died shortly after 19 March 1450.

== Sources ==
- Bónis, György (1971). A jogtudó értelmiség a Mohács előtti Magyarországon [Hungarian intelligentsia having legal expertise in the period before the battle of Mohács] (in Hungarian). Akadémiai Kiadó.
- C. Tóth, Norbert (2003). "Az esztergomi érseki szék üresedése 1418–1423 között [The Vacancy of the Archiepiscopal See of Esztergom between 1418 and 1423]". Századok (in Hungarian). 137 (4). Magyar Történelmi Társulat: 885–896. ISSN 0039-8098.
- C. Tóth, Norbert (2019). Az esztergomi székes- és társaskáptalanok archontológiája 1100–1543 [Archontology of the Cathedral and Collegiate Chapters of Esztergom, 1100–1543] (in Hungarian). Magyar Tudományos Akadémia Magyar Medievisztikai Kutatócsoportja. ISBN 978-963-508-913-0.
- Engel, Pál (1996). Magyarország világi archontológiája, 1301–1457, I. [Secular Archontology of Hungary, 1301–1457, Volume I] (in Hungarian). História, MTA Történettudományi Intézete. ISBN 963-8312-44-0.
- Mályusz, Elemér (1984). Zsigmond király uralma Magyarországon, 1387–1437 [The Rule of King Sigismund in Hungary, 1387–1437] (in Hungarian). Gondolat. ISBN 963-281-414-2.
- Tihányiová, Monika (2022). A Csetnekiek. Kultúrtörténeti és gazdaságtörténeti barangolások Felső-Gömörben [The Csetnekis. Cultural and Economic Historical Walking Tours in Upper Gemer] (in Hungarian). Translated by Padlovics, Ágnes. Martin Opitz Kiadó. ISBN 978-615-6388-09-4.

Ladislaus IV House of Csetneki Born: ? Died: 1450
Political offices
Preceded by	Lord Chancellor of the Queen; 1430–1437	Succeeded by
Catholic Church titles
Preceded by Dénes Szécsi	Bishop of Nyitra (elected); 1439–1448	Succeeded by Nicholas Zeleméri
