= Peter Csetneki =

Hungarian nobleman

Peter (I) Csetneki

Vice-ispán of Nógrád
- Reign: 1348–1350
- Predecessor: John
- Successor: Paul
- Died: 1366 or 1367
- Noble family: House of Csetneki
- Issue: John II; Nicholas IV
- Father: Benedict Csetneki

Peter (I) Csetneki (Hungarian: Csetneki (I.) Péter; died 1366 or 1367) was a Hungarian nobleman in the 14th century, who served as vice-ispán of Nógrád County from 1348 to 1350.

== Family affairs ==
Peter was born into the Csetneki family which originated from the gens (clan) Ákos and possessed lands mainly in Gömör County. Peter was the youngest son of Benedict Csetneki. His mother plausibly came from the gens Rátót. One of his brothers was Dominic, ancestor of the Bebek family. He also had four sisters. Peter first appears in records in 1318, when he was involved in a division agreement of family estates along with his brothers. While Dominic was granted the lordship of Pelsőc (present-day Plešivec, Slovakia), the other brothers – Nicholas (I) "the Cuman", Ladislaus (I), John (I) and Peter (I) – received Csetnek (present-day Štítnik, Slovakia), which functioned already as the family's seat prior to that. In accordance with the contract, which was confirmed in 1320 too, John and Peter were granted the western portion of Csetnek, along with the surrounding settlements Ochtina (Ochtiná), Rochfalva (Rochovce), Nagyszlabos (Slavošovce), Gencs (Honce), Gacsalk (Gočaltovo), Rozlozsnya (Rozložná), Somkút, Kövi and its castle (near present-day Rákoš), Nandrás (Nandraž), Vignye and Tarfalva (a predecessor of present-day Rákoš).

In the subsequent years, Peter is mentioned by contemporary records together with his brothers. Upon their request, Charles I of Hungary granted town rights and privileges to Csetnek and Pelsőc (together with the right to hold a fair and to collect customs) in 1328, despite that both settlements were a landlord's property. Both towns were granted only those privileges which guaranteed the maintenance of the Csetneki family's supremacy. They were involved in a series of lawsuits against the Máriássy family over the possessions Berzéte (Brzotín) and Krasznahorka (Krásna Hôrka), which both estates they had lost under unclear circumstances in the late 13th century. However, despite the cooperation, there were also conflicts between the brothers, for instance, over the shared use of the lead mine in Ardó (Ardovo). According to the verdict of Ladislaus, John and Peter from 1330, their brothers Dominic Bebek and Nicholas the Cuman arbitrarily seized the mine and they produced the lead only for themselves. In 1333, Ladislaus filed a lawsuit against all of his brothers, claiming that they intended to sell Berzéte and Krasznahorka to the Máriássys. Several lawsuits were also filed against Peter by his brothers, who complained that he arbitrarily and alone settled serfs on the border of Csetnek and tried to sell Kövi to Peter Jolsvai from the gens Rátót. In 1336, Ladislaus accused Peter of killing one of his serfs; Peter finally agreed to pay 7 marks in damages. Several members of the Csetneki family, including Peter, protested against the ownership of his brother Nicholas "the Cuman" over Krasznahorka before the palatinal court in 1354.

== Career ==
Peter entered the service of Kónya Szécsényi, an important baron in the court of Louis I of Hungary. As a familiaris of his lord Szécsényi, Peter Csetneki served as vice-ispán of Nógrád County from 1348 to 1350, together with Mark Fogacsi at least in 1349. Simultaneously, Peter also functioned as vice-ispán of Szepes County and (vice)-castellan of its fortress (Spiš) in 1349, under Kónya Szécsényi. He held the latter positions until July 1349, when both the county and the castle were transferred to the fiefdom of Duke Stephen of Anjou, the younger brother of Louis I.

His political career came to a screeching halt when he came into conflict with the powerful Pásztói (or Hasznosi) family, who originated from the Rátót clan. Still in 1348, king Louis I and queen mother Elizabeth instructed him to capture a thief in Nógrád County. In August, as he reported, Peter carried out the instruction and transported the thief to his lodgings in the village Veres (Mátraverebély), but Dominic Pásztói and his son Stephen, together with their troops, attacked him, liberating the thief, killing his two relatives and three servants, injuring six of them and robbing a value of 200 marks from him. Louis I sent his commissioner James Széki to investigate the conflict. The collegiate chapter of Buda summoned the Pásztóis to the palatinal court. In September 1347, the royal commissioner confirmed Peter's report. In March and June 1349, both Dominic and Stephen Pásztói were summoned before the court of Palatine Nicholas Kont; Stephen died between the two dates. Because of the case, it is plausible that Kónya Szécsényi transferred Peter Csetneki from Nógrád County to Szepes County in those months. There, queen mother Elizabeth ordered Peter to return the confiscated horses and value to the Antonite monastery of Daróc (today Dravce, Slovakia), which he took unlawfully. Throughout from 1349 to 1350, conducted judicial activities in the two counties, in accordance with his position of vice-ispán.

In July 1351, a judicial letter of Nicholas Kont says that Peter was charged of killing Stephen Pásztói and the palatine sentenced him a payment of a fine of 200 marks, which could be completed in four installments. Peter, as part of the banderium of Kónya Szécsényi, participated in the Neapolitan campaign in 1351, therefore he paid the first installment of fine in October in that year. Peter was called upon to swear before the chapter of Eger that he had no part in Stephen's death, but he allegedly never took this oath. Because of the huge amount, he was forced to part with his possessions. Royal commissioners traveled to Csetnek to collect the next part of the fine in November 1352, but Peter was not present. Therefore, the amount of the fine has increased and set a final payment deadline to 13 March 1353. Peter continued to insist on his innocence the following year, asking for a postponement and emphasizing his difficult financial situation in March 1354, caused by the fine and participation in the campaign, furthermore the damage caused six years ago by the Pásztóis was never repaired to him. In order to pay the fine, Peter had to pledge his portion in Csetnek and two villages, Rochfalva and Nagyszlabos, to his nephew Nicholas (III) the Red. When his brother John (I) died without male descendants in 1357 or 1358, Peter hoped to inherit his wealth (in accordance with the 1318–1320 agreements), but his nephews, Stephen and George Bebek claimed the castle of Kövi for themselves. Representatives of the provostry of Jászó (now Jasov in Slovakia), which was entrusted to conduct the lawsuit, found Peter at John's manor in Kövi and ordered him to stop the unlawful seizure of his deceased brother's property and to share the inheritance according to the contract. Peter was forced to make a deal with the Bebeks, as a conclusion of the lawsuit.

His total indebtedness is shown by the fact that he owed his lord Kónya Szécsényi a significant sum of money (72 golden florins). In 1363, his two surviving sons, John (II) and Nicholas (IV), protested against their father's decision to pledge the estate Sajó. Both of his sons predeceased him. When Peter died in 1366 or 1367, his wealth was divided among the descendants of his brothers, including the Bebeks. Slovak historian Monika Tihányiová considered that the Pásztóis represented such significant political power and influence in the royal court that, regardless of the truth of the accusations, they eroded Peter's financial resources, and that particular royal order and its escalation from 1348 ruined his career.

== Sources ==
- Engel, Pál (1996). Magyarország világi archontológiája, 1301–1457, I. [Secular Archontology of Hungary, 1301–1457, Volume I] (in Hungarian). História, MTA Történettudományi Intézete. ISBN 963-8312-44-0.
- Tihányiová, Monika (2022). A Csetnekiek. Kultúrtörténeti és gazdaságtörténeti barangolások Felső-Gömörben [The Csetnekis. Cultural and Economic Historical Walking Tours in Upper Gemer] (in Hungarian). Translated by Padlovics, Ágnes. Martin Opitz Kiadó. ISBN 978-615-6388-09-4.
