= George Csetneki =

Hungarian nobleman

George (II) Csetneki

Master of the stewards
- Reign: 1387–1396
- Predecessor: Ladislaus Vezsenyi
- Successor: Ivan Kurjaković
- Died: c. 31 July 1402
- Noble family: House of Csetneki
- Spouse: Catherine N
- Issue: Sigismund II; Catherine
- Father: Nicholas III Csetneki

George (II) Csetneki (Hungarian: Csetneki (II.) György; died around 31 July 1402) was a Hungarian baron at the turn of the 14th and 15th centuries, who served as Master of the stewards from 1387 to 1396, under King Sigismund. Alongside his cousin, prelate Ladislaus, he is the most illustrious member of the Csetneki family.

== Early career ==
He was born into the Csetneki family, which originated from the gens (clan) Ákos and held possessions mainly in Gömör County. His father was Nicholas (III) "the Red". He had a brother Peter (II).

George first appears in contemporary records in 1367, when a dispute arose between family members regarding the division of estates in the eponymous lordship Csetnek (present-day Štítnik, Slovakia). George, also representing his brother Peter, complained to the royal court that the Bebeks and the other branches of the Csetnekis agreed on the division of the estates of John (I) and Peter (I), who died without heirs, without their knowledge.

George, together with his second cousin Michael came to prominence during the last regnal years of Louis I of Hungary, due to the mining and ore trade that flourished in their lands at that time. George, together with his brother and cousins, was granted ius gladii by Louis over the subjects in their estates in 1378. Following the death of Louis in 1382, the Csetnekis supported his daughter Mary, Queen of Hungary and her mother Elizabeth of Bosnia during the internal conflict against Charles III of Naples. In April 1386, George and Michael were granted landholdings in Pest County for their faithful services by Mary. Following the capture of the queen, they swore allegiance to Sigismund, her husband. George and Michael took part in Sigismund's campaign into Croatia and they were present in the siege of Novigrad Castle, where the royal troops liberated Mary in June 1387.

== Under Sigismund ==
For his involvement in the aforementioned conflict, King Sigismund donated the estate Papouch in Križevci County to George in July 1387. By that time, George was appointed Master of the stewards; he is mentioned in this capacity from July 1387 to July 1396. A single source from June 1388 also refers to Michael as an office-holder of this royal courtly position. For their former services to Louis I and Mary, George and Michael were granted the royal castle of Szanda with its accessories – portions in Surány, Szanda and Bolhádalja, along with a custom in the village Guta – in Nógrád County by Sigismund in November 1387. However, the king donated the fort to John Pásztói three years later, around 1390.

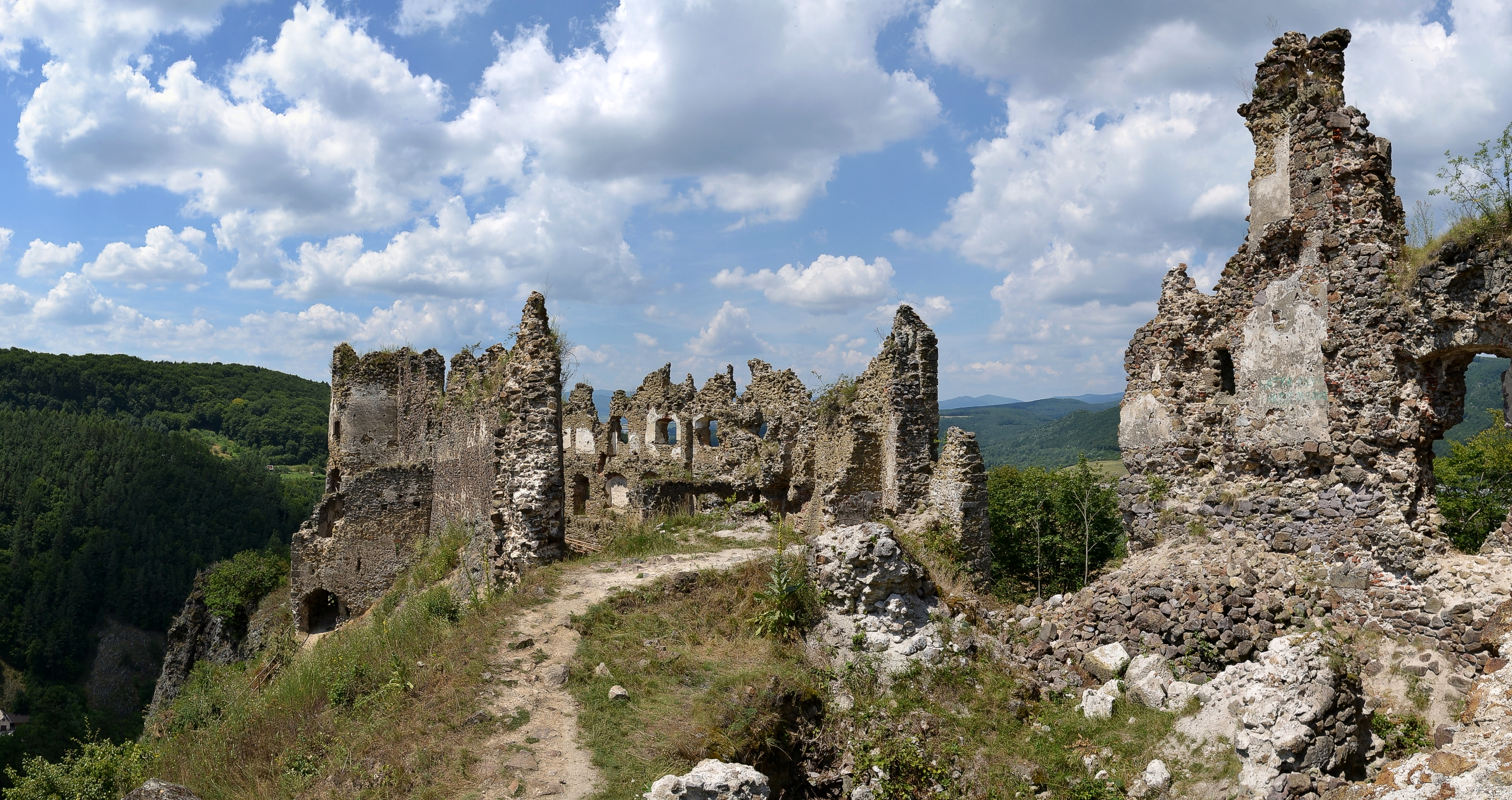
Saskő (Šášovský) Castle, today in Slovakia, owned by George Csetneki from 1396 onwards

As a member of the royal court, George frequently escorted Sigismund to his military campaigns to the southern border. He fought in the Hungarian–Ottoman War (1389–1396), he was present during the skirmishes against the Ottoman incursions in Temesvár (present-day Timișoara, Romania) in August 1392. It is plausible that George took part in the disastrous Battle of Nicopolis in September 1396, where his second cousin Michael was killed.

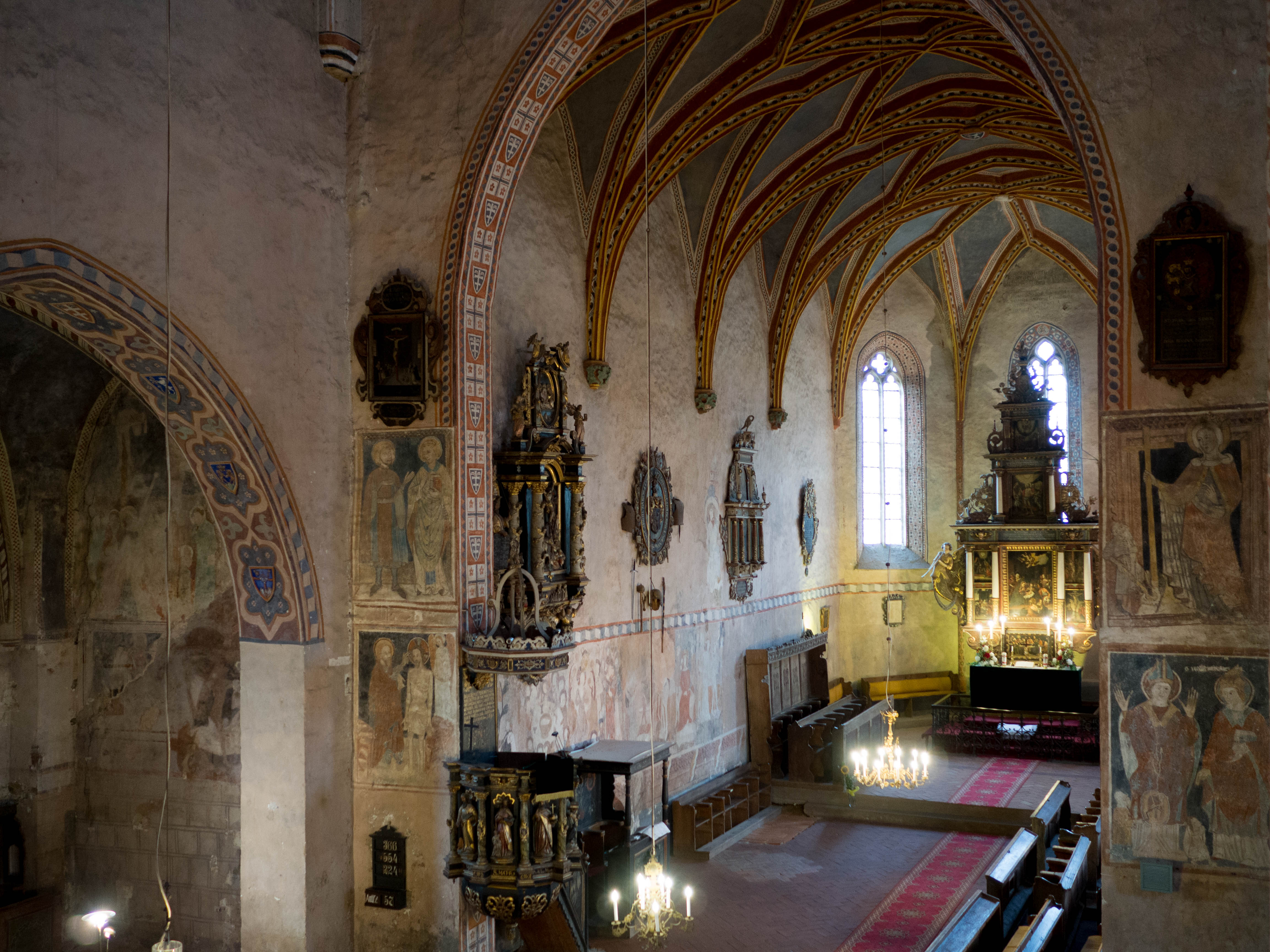
The late-14th-century interior of the church of Štítnik

Returning Hungary, George was succeeded as Master of the stewards by Croatian count Ivan Kurjaković sometime between September 1396 and February 1397. Despite that, he remained an influential member of the royal court. According to historian Pál Engel, George Csetneki served as ispán of Gömör County from 1397 until his death; he is first mentioned in this capacity in September 1399. He was granted the castle of Saskő (today ruins near Šášovské Podhradie, Slovakia) from Sigismund in 1396. Because of his frequent travels with Sigismund, Pope Boniface IX permitted him to use his own portable altar with clerical staff in his papal letter issued in June 1397, which was a significant privilege for a nobleman in the late 14th century. Upon his request, the pope also granted a privilege to collect tithes to the parish church of Csetnek. With his funding, the building was reconstructed into a three-aisled church with rich Gothic fresco decorations. Sometime after 1397, George lent a significant amount of money to lady Helena, who tried to ransom her husband, Palatine Leustach Jolsvai from Turkish captivity. He took the castle of Hrussó (present-day ruins near Hostie, Slovakia) as a pledge from the Jolsvai family on the occasion of the act.

The ailing George Csetneki compiled his last will and testament in Csetnek on 31 July 1402, before his relative, Palatine Derek Bebek. In the document, George bequeathed his all purchased and pledged property to his wife and daughter Catherine, with the stipulation that after the death of both of them the estates would belong to his son, Sigismund (II) and his descendants. George died shortly thereafter.

== Descendants ==
George Csetneki married a certain Catherine from an unidentified noble family. They had two children, Sigismund (II) and Catherine. The young Sigismund, who was named after the monarch and was the godson of him, belonged to the opposition group which organized a plot against the namesake king in 1401. Slovak historian Monika Tihányiová argued that George left him out of his will – excluding the village Csákány – because of this, but since he was his only son, he did not definitively exclude him from the inheritance. He was also involved in the conspiracy against King Sigismund in 1403, as a result his estate in Szentfalva (a former village in the territory of present-day Budapest) was confiscated. Sigismund married Dorothea Dunajeci. After 1403, Sigismund swore loyalty to the king and belonged to the young noble courtiers, as he was styled in this form from 1406 to 1402. He received a silver amphora from the widow of Leustach Jolsvai to pay George's previous loan in 1406. The king donated the castle of Hrussó in exchange for Saskő to Sigismund in 1409. In the subsequent years, he and his castellan Andrew Szepesi were frequently involved in conflicts with their neighbors, including the Garamszentbenedek Abbey. Sigismund (II) died without descendants sometime between 1418 and 1420.

George's daughter, Catherine married Ladislaus Ostfi de Asszonyfalva from the gens Osl. She sold a portion in Kovarc (today Kovarce, Slovakia) for 2,500 florin to the Bebek family in 1424. She compiled her last will and testament in the manor of Csetnek in 1433. As a childless lady, she bequeathed her jewelry, clothes and other stuff to the brothers of her late husband, the Csetneki family, the local parish church and her servants.

== Sources ==
- Engel, Pál (1996). Magyarország világi archontológiája, 1301–1457, I. [Secular Archontology of Hungary, 1301–1457, Volume I] (in Hungarian). História, MTA Történettudományi Intézete. ISBN 963-8312-44-0.
- Krantzieritz, Károly (2015). "A nikápolyi csata magyar résztvevői [Hungarian participants of the Battle of Nicopolis]". Hadtörténelmi Közlemények (in Hungarian). 128 (1). Hadtörténeti Intézet és Múzeum: 162–183. ISSN 0017-6540.
- Tihányiová, Monika (2022). A Csetnekiek. Kultúrtörténeti és gazdaságtörténeti barangolások Felső-Gömörben [The Csetnekis. Cultural and Economic Historical Walking Tours in Upper Gemer] (in Hungarian). Translated by Padlovics, Ágnes. Martin Opitz Kiadó. ISBN 978-615-6388-09-4.

George II House of Csetneki Born: ? Died: c. 31 July 1402
Political offices
Preceded by Ladislaus Vezsenyi	Master of the stewards 1387–1396	Succeeded by Ivan Kurjaković
