= Hungarian–Ottoman War (1389–1396) =

Fourth confrontation between the Kingdom of Hungary and the Ottoman Empire in the Balkans

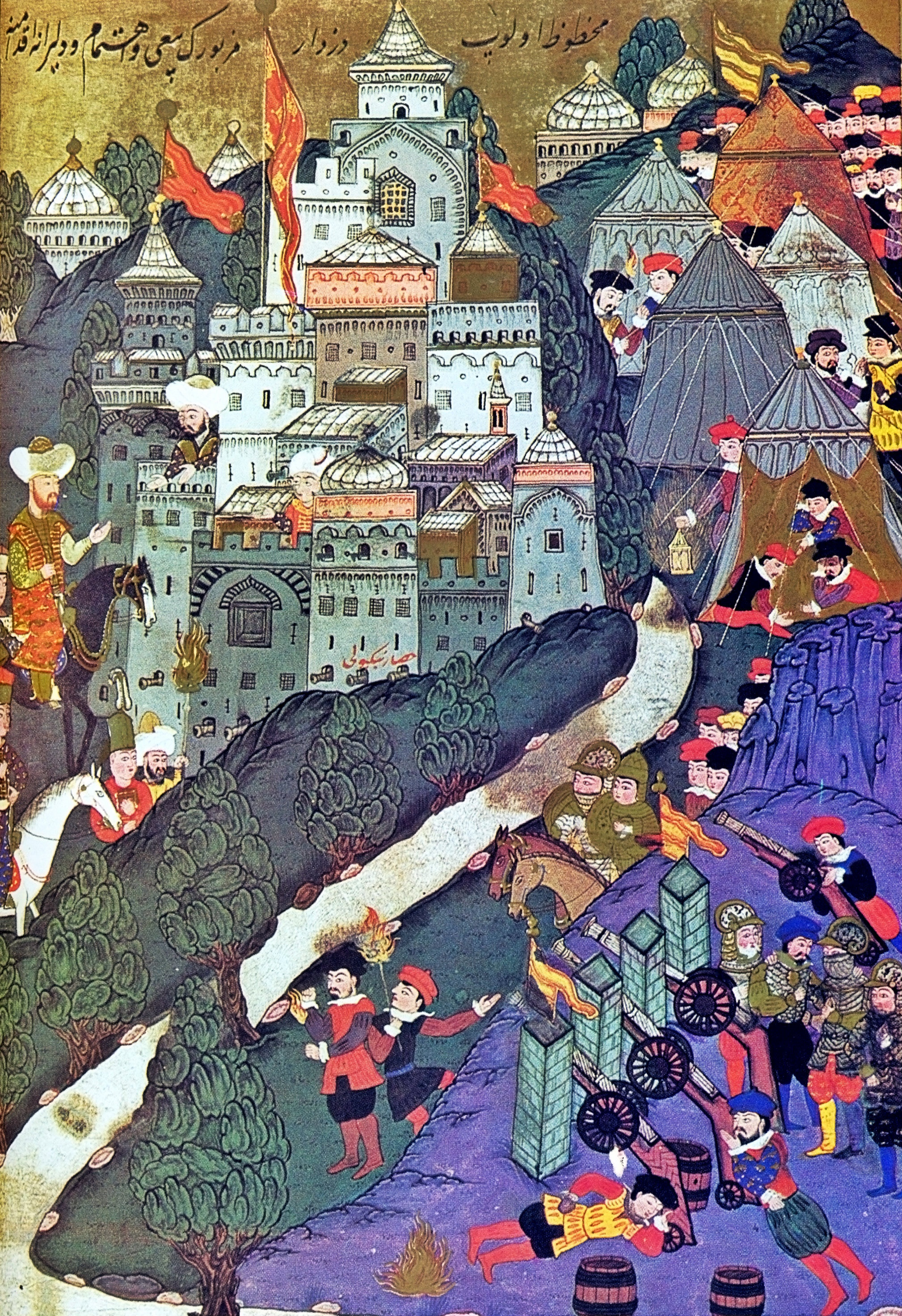
- Battle of Nicopolis in 1396
Date	1389 – 25 September 1396
Location	Syrmia, Nicopolis, Balkans, Kingdom of Hungary
Result	Ottoman victory (Note: The war ended after the Crusader army was defeated at the battle of Nicopolis, as a result of the defeat, Sigismund abandoned offensive campaigns and began building a system of fortifications along the southern border)

Belligerents
Kingdom of Hungary; Kingdom of Croatia; Principality of Wallachia; Supported by: Papal States; Kingdom of France; Duchy of Burgundy; Holy Roman Empire (Order of Knights of the Hospital of Saint John of Jerusalem) Knights Hospitaller	Ottoman Empire; Moravian Serbia

Commanders and leaders
Sigismund; Stibor of Stiboricz; Nicholas II Garai; Stjepan II. Lacković (Wallachia) Mircea I (Kingdom of France) Philippe d'Artois (POW) (Kingdom of France) Jean II Le Maingre (POW) (Kingdom of France) Enguerrand VII de Coucy (POW) (Kingdom of France) Jean de Vienne † (Kingdom of France) Jean de Carrouges † (Duchy of Burgundy) Jean de Nevers (POW) (Order of Knights of the Hospital of Saint John of Jerusalem) Philibert de Naillac	(Ottoman Empire) Bayezid I (Ottoman Empire) Ali Pasha (Ottoman Empire) Evrenos Bey (Ottoman Empire) Doğan Bey; Stefan Lazarević

Strength
1396: 17,000–20,000	1396: 10,000–15,000

Casualties and losses
Heavy	Heavy

The Hungarian–Ottoman War (1389–1396) was the fourth confrontation between the Kingdom of Hungary and the Ottoman Empire in the Balkans. The war ended in an Ottoman victory, as the crusaders suffered a devastating defeat in the battle of Nicopolis.

== Background ==
As a result of the Battle of Kosovo in 1389, the Kingdom of Serbia lost its independence and became a vassal state of the Ottomans, positioning the Kingdom of Hungary as a neighbor to the Ottoman Empire. At the onset of his reign, Sigismund of Luxemburg perceived the threat from the south. Initially, he saw strengthening the federal system inherited from the Anjou dynasty as the most viable strategy. His aim was to foster better relations with Moldova, Wallachia, and Bosnia while simultaneously engaging in military campaigns in the Kingdom of Serbia for several years.

== War ==
Incursions from Turkish and Serbian forces became commonplace in the counties of Temes, Krassó, and Syrmia. Miklós Perényi achieved numerous victories against Turkish armies in Syrmia between 1389 and 1392, while King Sigismund successfully laid siege to the castles of Čestin and Borač in northern Serbia.

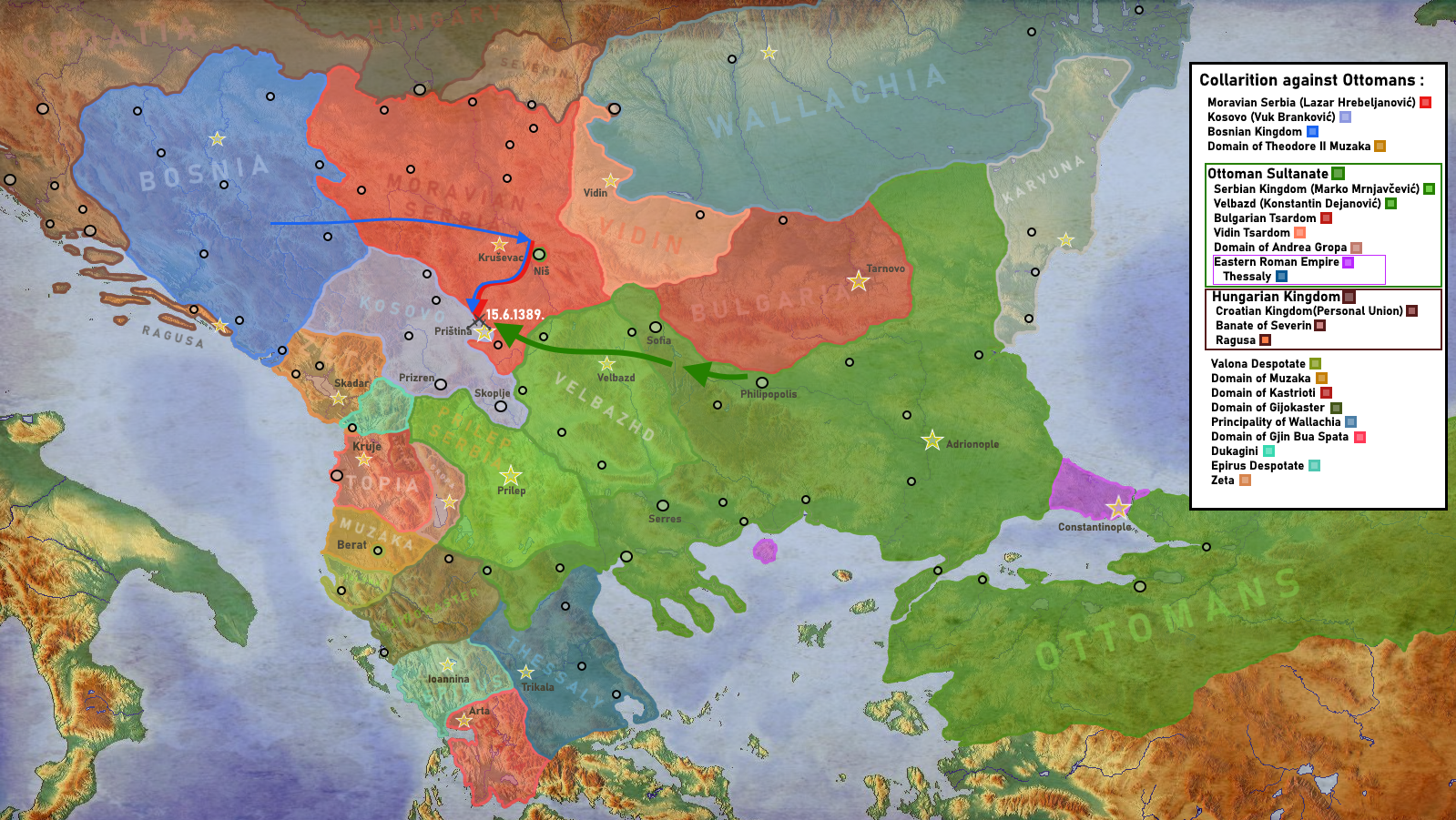
Balkans in 1389

Sigismund of Luxemburg's planned military actions are corroborated by documents issued during his reign over the Southern Banates, and other sources attest to his military endeavors. The young ruler led both the Hungarian nobility and the Hungarian Székelys of Transylvania, along with his allies, with diplomatic finesse and resolute leadership into battle.

Frank Szécsényi, the Voivode of Transylvania, participated in the Serbian campaigns, likely including Székelys in his army who were tasked with recruitment, reconnaissance, pass guarding, and possibly espionage in neighboring voivodeships.

Later accounts from Sibiu reveal that Transylvanian Saxons relied on skilled Székely archers for defending city walls. The sentries in the snowy mountains also provided swift courier services. In 1392, with the aid of Bohemian, Silesian, Austrian auxiliaries, and even English knights, Sigismund successfully negotiated with several rulers and advanced to Ždrelo. Sultan Bayezid opted not to confront his enemies directly and instead focused his forces in 1393 on the Bulgarian states of Tarnovo and Vidin in the Balkans, which either surrendered or fell under Ottoman control, thereby opening the path northwards for the Turks.

Prince Mircea the Elder of Wallachia, having previously fought alongside the Serbs against the Turks in the Battle of Kosovo, now had to defend his own land. On October 10, 1394, the Ottoman army attacked his small state, prompting Mircea to seek refuge in Hungarian territory, resulting in the Sultan replacing him with Vlad I.

In the same year, Voivode Stephen I of Moldavia blocked the Carpathian Straits and called for war against the Kingdom of Hungary. Sigismund quelled unrest in the principalities with two campaigns. Under István Kanizsai's command in 1394, the legions of the Székelys breached the newly established border zone and advanced to Suceava with the royal army.

During this campaign, the Székelys of Kászon demanded their own independent lieutenant position and the autonomy of Csíkszék. Though fully realized during King Matthias' reign, this bold move laid the groundwork for independent administration and separation from Csíkszék.

The Moldavian prince surrendered to Sigismund during the campaign, enriching the Kanizsai family with new donations for their loyalty. This was unsurprising given Miklós Kanizsai's diplomatic skills and pivotal role in the military victory, as he had already discussed plans for a joint crusade with Western rulers. In 1395, the Kingdom of Hungary launched its second counterattack, with increased participation from Transylvanian forces. Mircea the Elder, now appointed Prince of Fogaras, led his Romanian troops into Wallachia to reclaim his dignity and throne. István Kanizsai, Comes of the Székelys, again led the campaign, but was seriously injured in battle. They pushed the Turks back to the Danube and captured Turnu Măgurele, opposite the ancient city and castle of Nicopolis, held by a strong Turkish garrison.

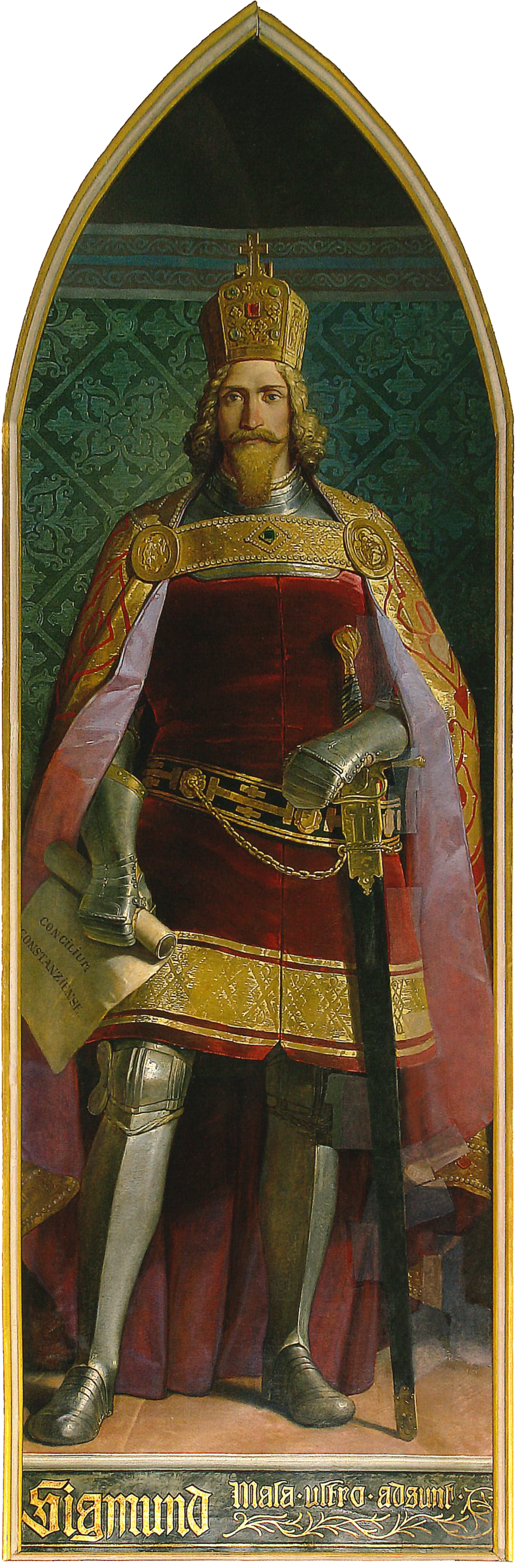
Sigismund of Luxembourg

King Sigismund of Hungary, according to the Chronica Hungarorum, was thrilled by the impressive army gathered around him in Buda, expressing confidence in their strength. The number of combatants at the Battle of Nicopolis is heavily debated, with estimates ranging widely. Firsthand accounts vary significantly, with Johann Schiltberger estimating around 17,000 crusaders and exaggerating Turkish forces at 200,000. Various historical sources provide differing figures for the composition of the crusader forces, with contributions from Kingdom of France, Republic of Venice, and Hungarian envoys. Reports of English involvement are likely exaggerated. Estimates for total crusader numbers vary, with some sources suggesting figures as high as 130,000. Ottoman forces are also subject to debate, with estimates ranging from 15,000 to 20,000 to as high as 60,000, including support from Serbian heavy cavalry.

Philip, Duke of Burgundy, initially intended to lead the crusade alongside John of Gaunt and Louis of Orleans. However, all three withdrew, citing the necessity of their presence for peace negotiations with England, though their reluctance to leave their rivals' proximity might also have been a factor. Burgundy, still funding the expedition, maintained control by nominally appointing his eldest son, 24-year-old John, Count of Nevers, as the commander. Acknowledging the lack of experience in his son and other young leaders, Burgundy sought the guidance of Enguerrand VII, Lord of Coucy, a seasoned warrior and statesman, designating him as "chief counselor" to Nevers. Despite numerous counselors and prominent French lords accompanying Nevers, medieval warriors did not fully embrace the concept of unified command.

The crusade departed from Dijon on April 30, 1396, journeying through Bavaria to the upper Danube, where they utilized river transport to join Sigismund in Buda. The crusaders' objectives were vague but included expelling the Turks from the Balkans, aiding Constantinople, and ultimately liberating Palestine. Venetian ships were arranged to blockade the Turks in the Sea of Marmara, with plans for the Venetian fleet to meet with the crusaders in Wallachia.

Coucy, detached on a diplomatic mission to the Duke of Milan, arrived in Buda ahead of Nevers, who delayed his journey for receptions and festivities. The French leaders, including Coucy, faced strategic disagreements in Buda. While some advocated waiting for the Turks to march to them, Coucy insisted on pursuing the enemy. The crusaders, accompanied by Hungarian forces, embarked on their march down the Danube, encountering pillaging and indiscipline as they entered Muslim-held territories. Crossing the Danube at the Iron Gate, the crusaders targeted Vidin and then Oryahovo, where French actions led to tensions with their Hungarian allies. Despite these conflicts, they pressed on towards Nicopolis, where they faced their ultimate challenge.

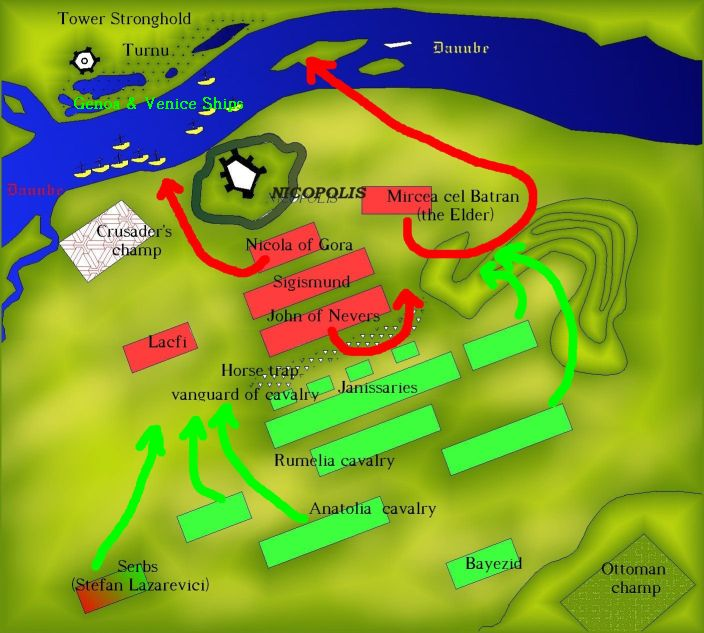
Map depicting the battle of Nicopolis

=== Siege of Nicopolis ===
Nicopolis, strategically positioned in a natural defensive setting, commanded the lower Danube and vital communication routes inland.It comprised two walled towns, with the larger one situated atop the cliff and the smaller below. The fortress, under the governance of the well-prepared Turkish governor, Doğan Bey, was deemed impregnable, supplied, and ready for a prolonged siege.

Despite the crusaders' optimism, their lack of siege machinery and the formidable fortifications rendered a direct assault futile. They opted for a blockade strategy, surrounding the town and cutting off its supply routes, anticipating that the siege would serve as a precursor to a larger campaign aimed at relieving Constantinople. However, they underestimated the speed at which Bayezid I would respond.

As the crusaders idled away two weeks with feasts and games, neglecting sentry duties, rumors of the Turks' approach began to circulate. Bayezid, already en route through Adrianople with Serbian support, sent out reconnaissance forces, confirming the impending threat. Despite warnings, Boucicaut dismissed the Turks' imminent arrival as mere speculation, threatening those who entertained such notions. Enguerrand VII de Coucy, one of the few proactive commanders, led a reconnaissance mission and engaged a Turkish force in a successful ambush, briefly reinvigorating the crusaders' morale. However, his initiative drew criticism from jealous rivals and fueled overconfidence among the French ranks.

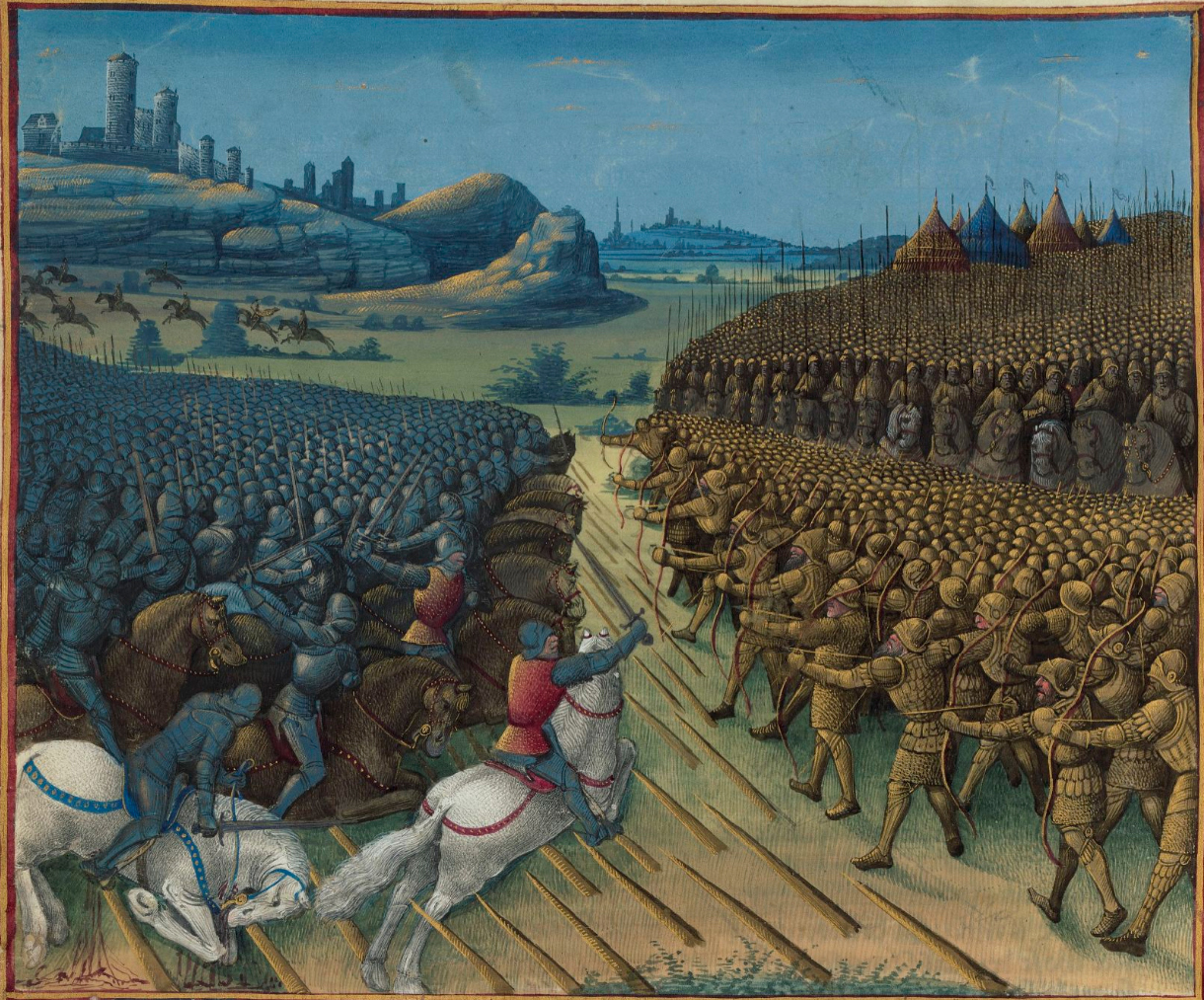
Battle of Nicopolis

=== Battle of Nicopolis ===
As the sun rose on September 25, the opposing forces began to muster under their respective banners. Sigismund, seeking to gather more intelligence on the approaching Turkish vanguard, requested a two-hour postponement of the offensive. Nevers, after a swift council of advisors, including Coucy and Admiral Jean de Vienne, opted to honor Sigismund's request. However, D'Eu, suspicious of Sigismund's motives, insisted on leading the charge, accusing Sigismund of seeking personal glory. This sparked a heated debate, with younger knights advocating for immediate action, while elder knights advised a coordinated advance with the Hungarians and allies.

D'Eu assumed command of the French vanguard, while Nevers and Coucy led the main body. The French knights, accompanied by mounted archers, rode out to meet the descending Turkish forces. Accounts of the ensuing battle vary, with some describing a chaotic clash where the French initially overwhelmed the Turkish front line but faced heavy resistance from archers and obstacles like sharpened stakes. Despite recommendations from Coucy and Vienne to regroup and await Hungarian support, the younger knights, believing they had vanquished the entire Turkish army, insisted on pursuing the retreating enemy. Pressing forward, the French knights found themselves facing a fresh corps of sipahis, whom Bayezid had held in reserve. As the sipahis launched a counterattack, the French realized the direness of their situation. Admiral de Vienne, carrying the French standard, fought valiantly before being wounded, while other notable knights fell in battle. With Nevers captured, the remaining French forces surrendered. Amidst the chaos, sipahis encircled the flanks, and confusion reigned on the battlefield. Sigismund's forces faced overwhelming odds, and many sought escape. Count Hermann of Cilli facilitated Sigismund's retreat, while Bayezid's reinforcements, including Serbian knights under Stefan Lazarević, ensured the defeat of Sigismund's army. Sigismund, with a few allies, managed to escape, while the rest surrendered, marking a decisive victory for Bayezid.

Execution of prisoners after the battle

== Aftermath ==
Sigismund later expressed his frustration to the Hospitaller Master, attributing the day's loss to the French arrogance and refusal to heed his advice. Chronicler Jean Froissart lamented the defeat, comparing it to the disastrous Battle of Roncesvalles, which saw the demise of all twelve peers of France, stating that Christendom had not suffered such a blow since then.

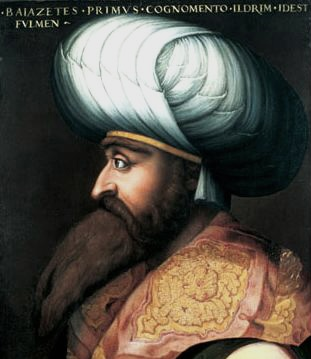
Sultan Bayezid I

Following the battle, Bayezid, enraged by the discovery of the massacred prisoners from Rahovo, ordered the assembly of all captives the next morning. Among them, notable figures like Coucy, Bar, D'Eu, and Gui de La Tremoïlle were spared for ransom, while those judged to be under 20 were taken as slaves. The remaining captives, numbering in the thousands, were subjected to a brutal massacre, either by decapitation or dismemberment.

Those who fled the battlefield faced grim fates. Many drowned attempting to swim across the Danube, while others perished from starvation and exposure as they traversed barren lands. Sigismund, fearing betrayal from Wallachia, made a treacherous journey to safety, eventually returning home by sea. The few survivors who made it back faced a harsh reception, with Count Rupert of Bavaria among them, arriving in beggar's rags only to succumb to his trials shortly after.

The captives, stripped and beaten, were marched to Gallipoli and later to Bursa, where they awaited news of their ransom. Rumors of the defeat reached Paris in December, plunging the city into mourning. Jacques de Helly, charged by Bayezid to convey news of the victory and ransom demands, arrived in Paris on Christmas, bearing grim tidings. Efforts to negotiate the captives' release spanned months, with Venice playing a crucial role as a conduit for communication and ransom exchange.

In February, de Coucy died, followed by de Tremoille shortly after. Negotiations for ransom dragged on, complicated by financial and logistical challenges. Plagued by setbacks, including a plague outbreak in Venice, the nobles finally returned to France in early 1398, greeted with orchestrated celebrations across the kingdom. The Battle of Nicopolis had broader ramifications, marking the end of the Second Bulgarian Empire and discouraging future European coalitions against the Turks. It solidified Turkish control over the Balkans and posed a greater threat to central Europe, setting the stage for further Ottoman expansion and the eventual fall of Constantinople. As a result of the defeat, Sigismund abandoned offensive campaigns and began building a system of fortifications along the southern border. As a mature ruler, he introduced military reforms that ensured the long-term defense of the Kingdom of Hungary.

== See also ==
- Hungarian–Ottoman War (1375–1377)
- Hungarian–Ottoman War (1366–1367)

== Sources ==
- Engel, Pál (1998). "A török–magyar háborúk első évei 1389–1392 [The First Years of the Hungarian–Ottoman Wars 1389–1392]". Hadtörténelmi Közlemények (in Hungarian). 111 (3). Hadtörténeti Intézet és Múzeum: 12–28. ISSN 0017-6540.
- Pálosfalvi, Tamás (2018). From Nicopolis to Mohács. A History of Ottoman–Hungarian Warfare, 1389–1526. Brill. ISBN 978-90-04-36584-1.
- Szakály, Ferenc (1979). "Phases of Turco–Hungarian Warfare before the Battle of Mohács (1365–1526)". Acta Orientalia Academiae Scientiarum Hungaricae (in Hungarian). 33 (1). Hungarian Academy of Sciences: 65–111. ISSN 0001-6446.
- Tuchman Barbara, A Distant Mirror: The Calamitous 14th Century, 1978 ISBN 9780345283948
- Schlittberger Johann, The Bondage and Travels of Johann Schiltberger: From the Battle of Nicopolis 1396 to freedom 1427 A.D. ISBN 1539657949
- Huizinga Johan, The Waning of the Middle Ages, 1919 ISBN 842067950X
