= Gočaltovo =

Village and municipality in Slovakia

Gočaltovo Gacsalk
- Municipality
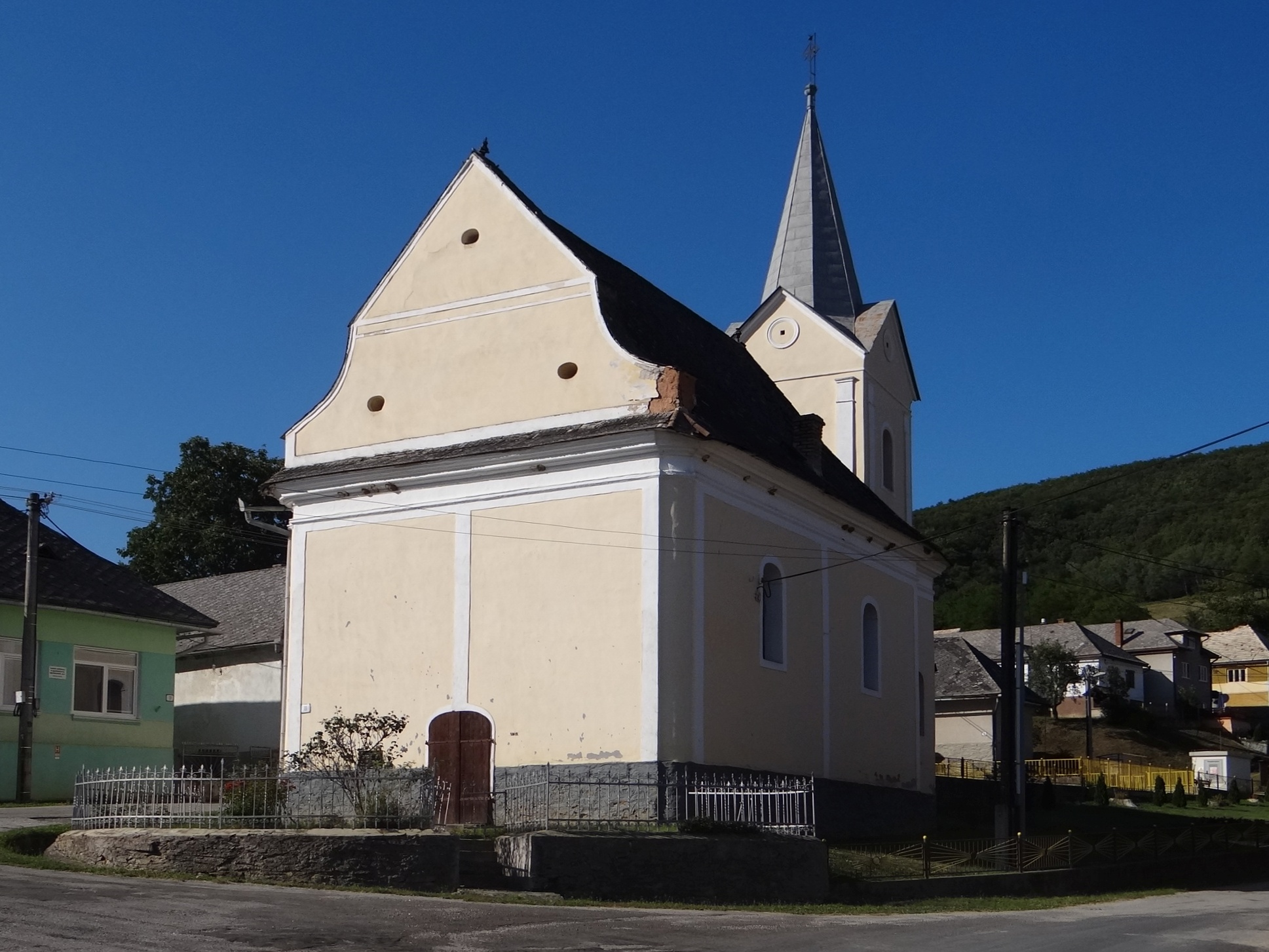

- Flag

- Location of Gočaltovo in the Košice Region Location of Gočaltovo in Slovakia
- Coordinates: 48.63°N 20.35°E
- Country: Slovakia
- Region: Košice Region
- District: Rožňava District
- First mentioned: 1318

Area
  - Total: 10.67 km^{2} (4.12 sq mi)
- Elevation: 365 m (1,198 ft)

Population (2025)
  - Total: 208
- Time zone: UTC+1 (CET)
  - Summer (DST): UTC+2 (CEST)
- Postal code: 493 2
- Area code: +421 58
- Vehicle registration plate (until 2022): RV
- Website: www.gocaltovo.sk

Gočaltovo (Hungarian: Gacsalk) is a village and municipality in the Rožňava District in the Košice Region of middle-eastern Slovakia.

== History ==
In historical records the village was first mentioned in 1318. Before the establishment of independent Czechoslovakia in 1918, Gočaltovo was part of Gömör and Kishont County within the Kingdom of Hungary. From 1939 to 1945, it was part of the Slovak Republic.

== Geography ==
The municipality lies at an altitude of 365 metres (1,198 ft) and covers an area of 10.67 km^{2} (4.12 sq mi) (2025).

== Population ==
Population statistic (10 years)
Year	1995	2005	2015	2025
Count	270	252	232	208
Difference		−6.66%	−7.93%	−10.34%

Population statistic
Year	2024	2025
Count	209	208
Difference		−0.47%

It has a population of 208 people (31 December 2025).

=== Ethnicity ===
Census 2021 (1+ %)
Ethnicity	Number	Fraction
Slovak	213	93.42%
Not found out	9	3.94%
Romani	4	1.75%
Czech	3	1.31%
Hungarian	3	1.31%
Total	228	

In year 2021 was 228 people by ethnicity 213 as Slovak, 9 as Not found out, 4 as Romani, 3 as Czech and 3 as Hungarian.

Note on population: The difference values of population numbers in the table "Population statistic" and in the sections "Ethnicity" & "Religion" is caused by the use of various statistical methods.

=== Religion ===
Census 2021 (1+ %)
Religion	Number	Fraction
None	136	59.65%
Evangelical Church	60	26.32%
Roman Catholic Church	15	6.58%
Not found out	8	3.51%
Greek Catholic Church	5	2.19%
Total	228	

In year 2021 was 228 people by religion 136 from None, 60 from Evangelical Church, 15 from Roman Catholic Church, 8 from Not found out, 5 from Greek Catholic Church, 1 from Old Catholic Church, 1 from Calvinist Church, 1 from Eastern Orthodox Church and 1 from Czechoslovak Hussite Church.

== Culture ==
The village has a public library.

== Genealogical resources ==
The records for genealogical research are available at the state archive "Statny Archiv in Kosice, Slovakia"

- Lutheran church records (births/marriages/deaths): 1782-1952 (parish B)

== See also ==
- List of municipalities and towns in Slovakia
