= Honce =

Village and municipality in Slovakia

Honce Kisgencs
- Municipality
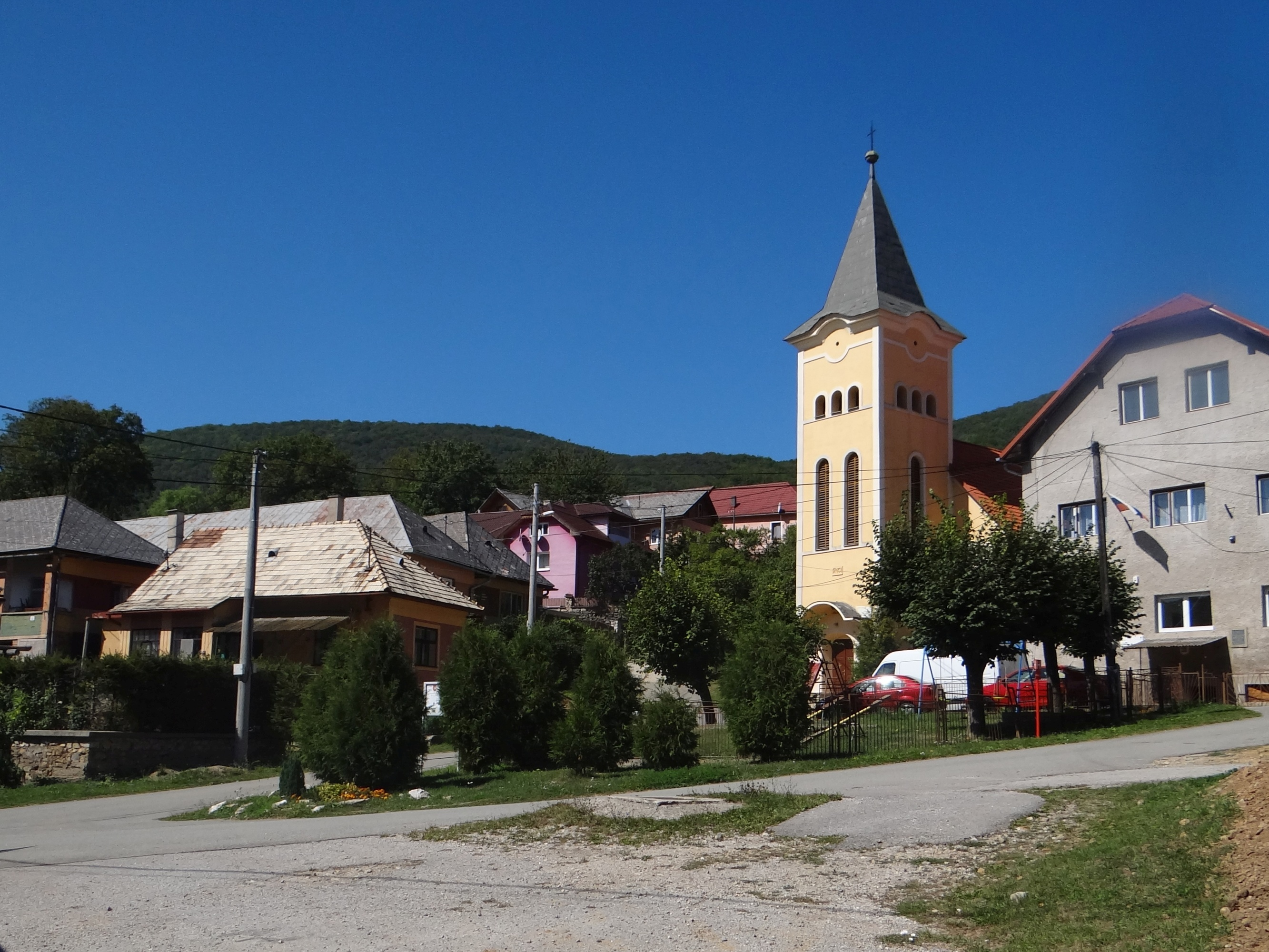

- Flag

- Location of Honce in the Košice Region Location of Honce in Slovakia
- Coordinates: 48.67°N 20.40°E
- Country: Slovakia
- Region: Košice Region
- District: Rožňava District
- First mentioned: 1318

Area
  - Total: 8.08 km^{2} (3.12 sq mi)
- Elevation: 377 m (1,237 ft)

Population (2025)
  - Total: 324
- Time zone: UTC+1 (CET)
  - Summer (DST): UTC+2 (CEST)
- Postal code: 493 4
- Area code: +421 58
- Vehicle registration plate (until 2022): RV
- Website: www.honce.sk

Honce (Hungarian: Kisgencs) is a village and municipality in the Rožňava District in the Košice Region of eastern Slovakia.

== Geography ==
The municipality lies at an altitude of 377 metres (1,237 ft) and covers an area of 8.08 km^{2} (3.12 sq mi) (2025).

== History ==
Before the establishment of independent Czechoslovakia in 1918, Honce was part of Gömör and Kishont County within the Kingdom of Hungary. From 1939 to 1945, it was part of the Slovak Republic.

== Population ==
Population statistic (10 years)
Year	1995	2005	2015	2025
Count	418	389	366	324
Difference		−6.93%	−5.91%	−11.47%

Population statistic
Year	2024	2025
Count	327	324
Difference		−0.91%

It has a population of 324 people (31 December 2025).

=== Ethnicity ===
Census 2021 (1+ %)
Ethnicity	Number	Fraction
Slovak	325	96.72%
Not found out	7	2.08%
Hungarian	5	1.48%
Total	336	

In year 2021 was 336 people by ethnicity 325 as Slovak, 7 as Not found out, 5 as Hungarian and 2 as Czech.

Note on population: The difference values of population numbers in the table "Population statistic" and in the sections "Ethnicity" & "Religion" is caused by the use of various statistical methods.

=== Religion ===
Census 2021 (1+ %)
Religion	Number	Fraction
None	165	49.11%
Evangelical Church	118	35.12%
Roman Catholic Church	28	8.33%
Not found out	7	2.08%
Apostolic Church	6	1.79%
United Methodist Church	4	1.19%
Ad hoc movements	4	1.19%
Total	336	

In year 2021 was 336 people by religion 165 from None, 118 from Evangelical Church, 28 from Roman Catholic Church, 7 from Not found out, 6 from Apostolic Church, 4 from United Methodist Church, 4 from Ad hoc movements, 2 from Calvinist Church and 2 from Greek Catholic Church.

== Genealogical resources ==
The records for genealogical research are available at the state archive "Statny Archiv in Kosice, Slovakia"

- Roman Catholic church records (births/marriages/deaths): 1735-1895 (parish B)
- Lutheran church records (births/marriages/deaths): 1683-1937 (parish B)

== See also ==
- List of municipalities and towns in Slovakia
