= Hungarian–Ottoman War (1375–1377) =

Armed confrontation in the Balkans

- Part of the Hungarian–Ottoman Wars, Hungarian–Wallachian War and the Polish–Ottoman Wars
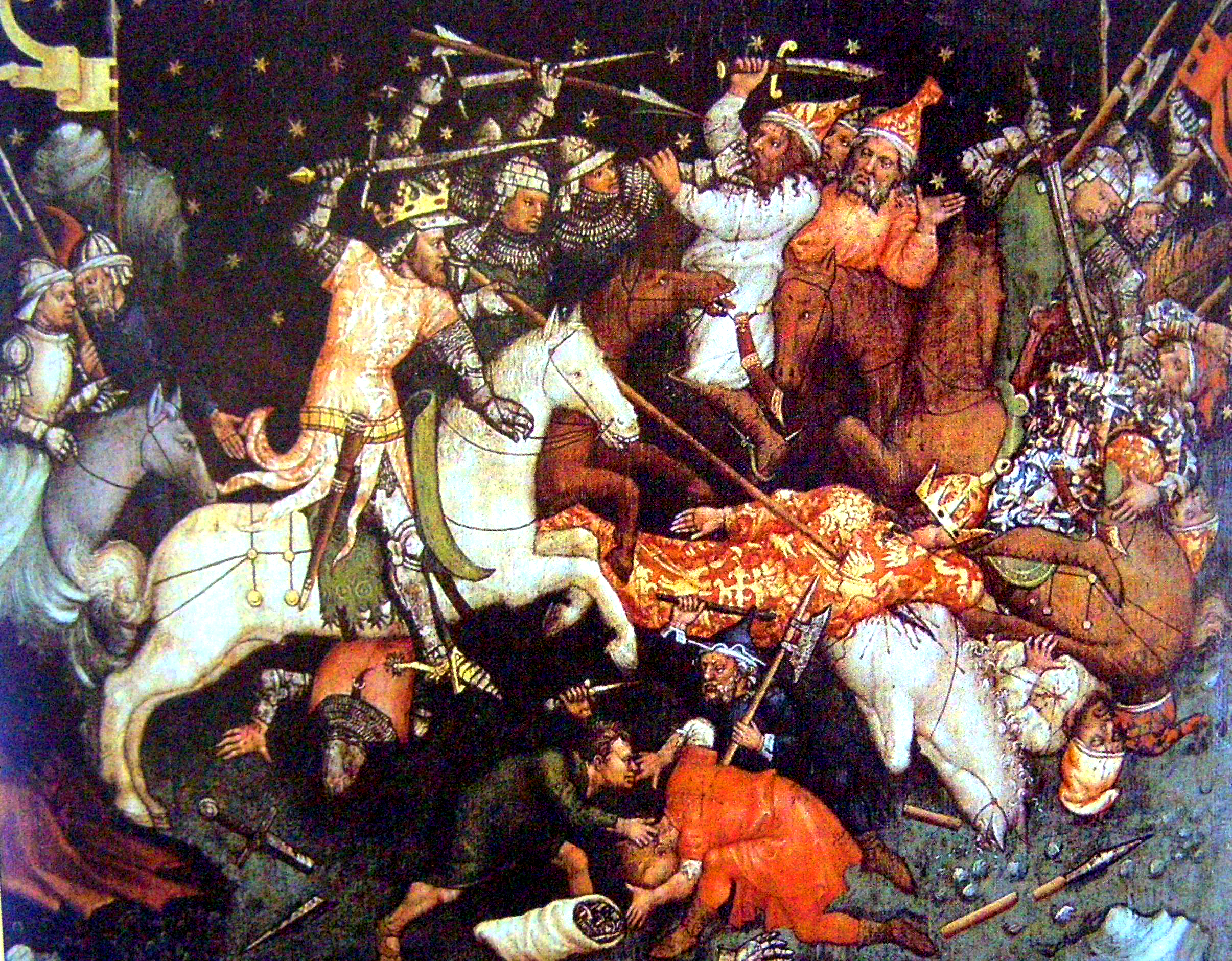
- Victory of King Louis the Great against the Ottomans in Bulgaria
Date	1 May 1375–1377
Location	Balkans, Kingdom of Hungary
Result	Hungarian victory

Belligerents
Kingdom of Hungary supported by: Kingdom of Poland	Ottoman Empire (Second Bulgarian Empire) Bulgarian Empire; Principality of Wallachia

Commanders and leaders
Louis I	(Ottoman Empire) Murad I (Second Bulgarian Empire) Ivan Shishman (Wallachia) Radu I

Strength
40,000	Unknown

The Hungarian–Ottoman War (1375–1377) was the third confrontation between the Kingdom of Hungary and the Ottoman Empire in the Balkans. The war ended in a Hungarian victory, as the armies of Louis I dealt a blow in Bulgaria not only to the Turks, but also to the Bulgarian ruler Ivan Shisman, who was allied with them in 1377.

== Background ==
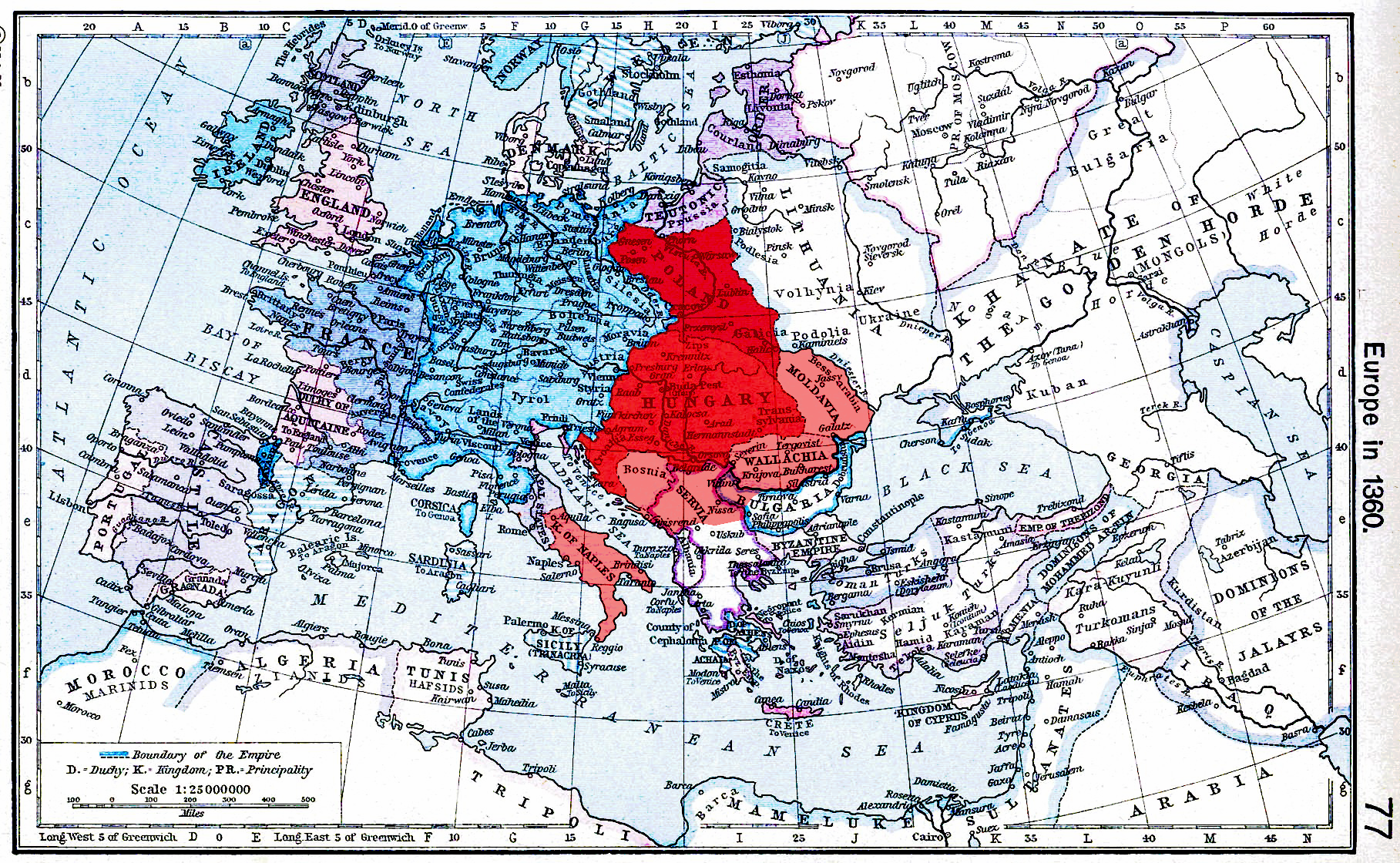
Lands ruled by King Louis the Great: Personal union between the Kingdom of Hungary and the Kingdom of Poland in 1370–1382 are colored red, the vassal states and the temporarily controlled territories are coloured light red

By helping the Ottoman army across the Dardanelles in 1345, the Byzantine pretender to the throne, John V Palaiologos, brought the Turkish threat not only to his own country, but also to the South Slavic countries, which were still fighting among themselves and suffering from internal strife. When his former supporters turned against Palaiologos, who had been crowned emperor, the emperor (for the first time in the history of Byzantine emperors) went to Western Europe to seek help. The Pope and the King of Hungary, were spurred into action by the fact that Ivan Shisman had imprisoned the Emperor John.

Louis intervened in the internal conflict in Bulgaria and in 1365 seized the territories around Vidin, which he reorganised into a province called the Vidin province, and from then on treated Bulgaria as his "right of inheritance". His campaigns in the Balkans were accompanied by the spread of Roman Catholicism among the Orthodox Slavs, which led to opposition from virtually all the southern Slavic countries and the Romanian principalities. From the second half of the 1360s, the king of Hungary was countered by a coalition of Wallachia, Bulgaria and Serbia.

In 1366, the first anti-Turkish campaign took place, which Hungary launched in alliance with some other states. It is said that Louis' army was victorious. Despite the success, Hungarian rule in northern Bulgaria was not consolidated, and Louis had to organise the Vidin province into a vassal state with his loyalist Ivan Stratsimir, because he could not effectively control it. Vladislav I of Wallachia, in alliance with Ivan Shishman, drove the Hungarians out of northern Bulgaria, and even conquered the Banate of Severin in 1369. After the end of the Hungarian rule in Bulgaria, the Ottomans launched an offensive in the Balkans. In 1371, in the battle of Maritsa, they annihilated the Bulgarians and their Serbian allies, making Ivan Shishman a vassal of the Turkish Sultan.

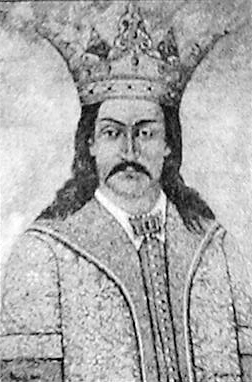
Vladislav I of Wallachia

Between 1374 and 1375, Pope Gregory XI begged Louis with letters to take decisive and swift action against the Ottomans. Louis felt that Hungary could handle the Turks on its own, which is why he went to war without the help of the Pope or any other state. This task he had set himself could not require the help of the Serbian, Bulgarian and Romanian states, so the king continued to convert the Balkan Orthodox, but he still counted on their help against the Turks, obviously trusting in Christian solidarity, even though Louis considered the Orthodox to be only half-Christians. Because of his Crusades, the peoples of the Balkans turned against him and, began to orient themselves towards the Turks.

Louis's forthcoming campaign was leaked by Voivode Vladislav I of Wallachia and he immediately formed an alliance with Ivan Shishman and Sultan Murad I. Only Ivan Stratsimir was prepared to support Louis, but he was isolated in Bulgaria. Republic of Venice, which was still at war with Hungary, also gave support to Vladislav by sending him large quantities of weapons.

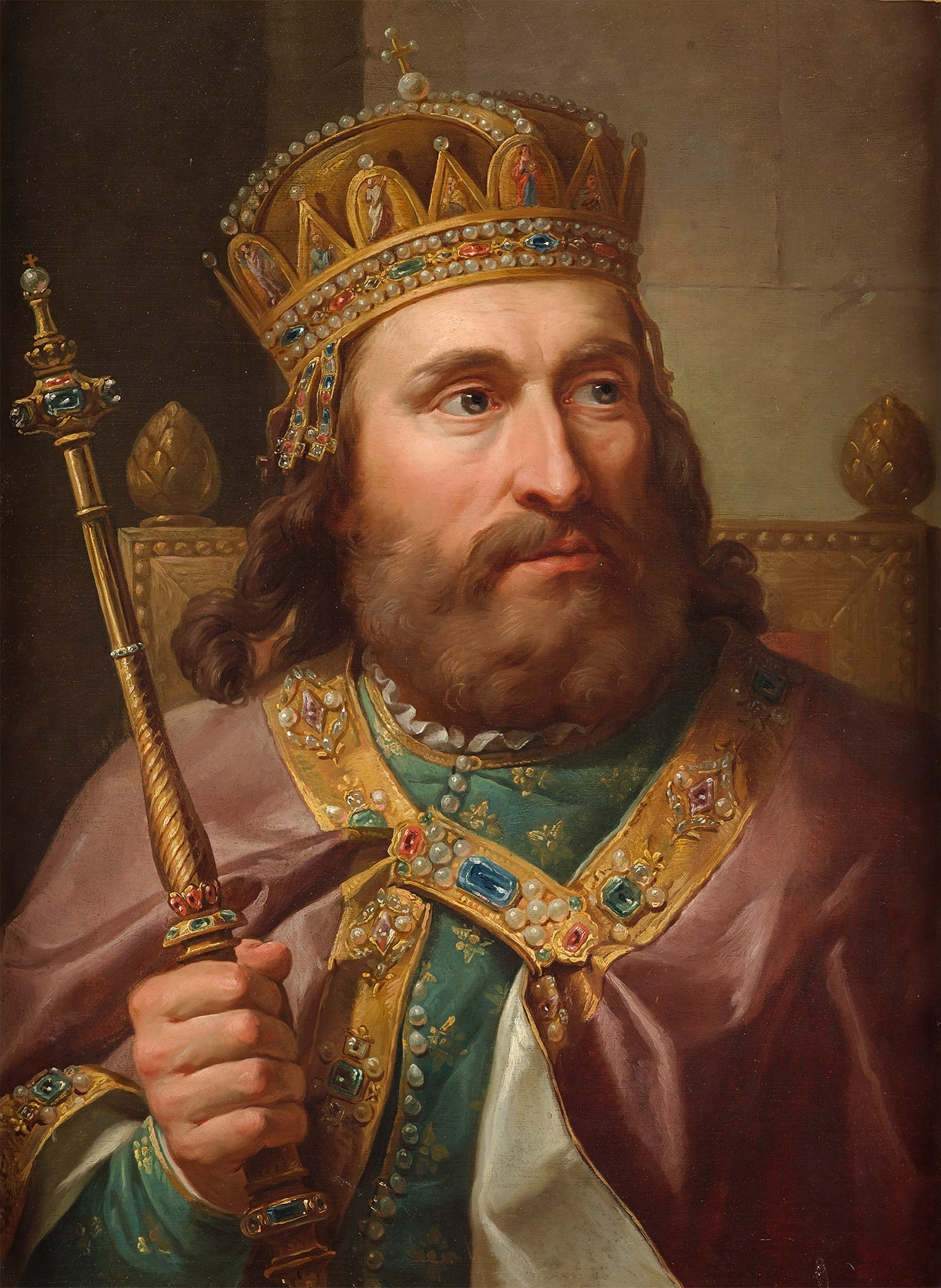
Louis the Great

== War ==
Around the 1st of May, Louis' army of 40,000 men assembled at Várad (now Oradea) in the Kingdom of Hungary to march against the Turks through Wallachia. At first, he expected the Voivode of Wallachia to join him, but his hopes were not realised.

From Temesvár (now Timișoara), the army moved in two directions, one staying in Transylvania, the other marching through Banate of Szörény to Wallachia. The king pushed into the interior of Romania via Mezősomlyó, where he won a great victory over the Ottoman and Bulgarian reinforcements of Vladislav's army under the leadership of Nicholas I Garai, the palatine of Valjevo.

The army of Transylvania had to prevent the Voivode Vladislav from invading the country through the Carpathians. Vladislav I of Wallachia prepared a counterattack in early July. Louis found himself in a critical situation, not because of the Ottoman counter-attack in Transylvania, but because on 25 July the Transylvanian Saxons deserted from the royal army at Székelyzsombor, and Louis' troops were dwindling. Louis arrived in Cluj first in mid-August, then returned to Timisoara in early September, and from there he went to Buda.

In the meantime, the Hungarian army again entered the Wallachia, where it was defeated by the Romanians, who were also supported by the Ottomans. In the second half of September, the Ottomans entered southern Transylvania by crossing the Temesköz. Here, however, Louis' army fought them effectively. In the fighting, Peter Himfi, the castellan of Orosva and former ban of Vidin, was killed, and Margaret, the daughter of his brother Benedict Himfi was kidnapped by the Ottomans.

Although the first direct Ottoman attack on Hungary was successfully repulsed, despite the devastation, it was not yet felt seriously by the Hungarians. Especially as the Turks did not occupy any territory and, with their insufficient numbers (perhaps only 2,000), they had neither the opportunity nor the intention to do so. Murad I, too, sent his soldiers on a campaign in Hungary for the sole purpose of assisting the Voivode of the Vojvodina and possibly gaining an insight into the Hungarian territories. Nor could he have aimed at conquering Hungary, as his successor, Bayezid I, had done.

With the Ottoman attack repulsed, Louis again had reason for optimism. It seemed that even after the death of the king, Hungary was not seriously threatened by the enemy, although one or two stray raiding parties did appear on the borders, coming from Rumelia only for reconnaissance and plunder.

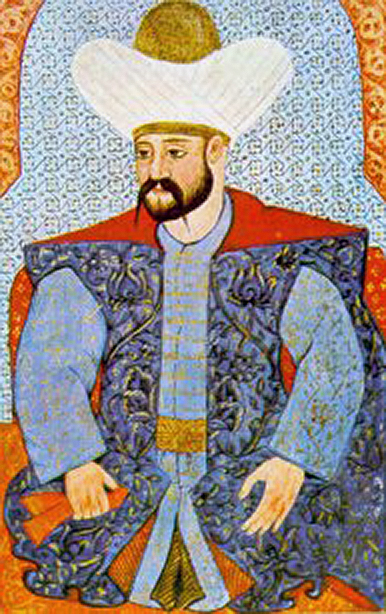
Murad I

In 1377, Louis went on another campaign against the Ottomans. This time, Vladislav could not stand in his way, because he died a few months before. The new Voivode, Radu I, fought the Hungarian army marching through his country, the battle was without a clear winner

The Hungarians invaded Bulgaria, where they were immediately confronted by Ivan Shishman, Murad's vassal, whose army was reinforced by Turks. Some historians consider Louis Victorious in the war because for years afterwards the Turkish army in the Balkans did not show the same active intensity as in the 1370s and 1360s. while some Turkish historians believe that Louis may have triumphed and did not succeed his expectations

Louis may have considered the Ottoman affair closed, because he diverted his attention from the Balkans and instead led his hordes eastwards to Poland. Lithuania was already fighting the Hungarian-Polish ruler in the fourteenth century. In this campaign, Louis conquered Halych, which many Hungarian kings had coveted for centuries, and annexed it to his country as a voivodeship of Ruthenia.

== Aftermath ==
After the conflict the Ottoman power was not broken, and because they were not very serious clashes. Louis could no longer think of further anti-Turkish campaigns. He was quite old and the wars also caused great financial losses to the treasury.

This is when the struggle between Hungary and the Ottoman Empire, which lasted for over a hundred years, really begins. Although, the Turks eventually overcame their Hungarian rivals at the battle of Mohács in 1526.

== See also ==
- Hungarian-Ottoman Wars
- Louis I of Hungary
- Ivan Shishman
- Polish-Ottoman Wars
- Crusade of Varna
- Siege of Belgrade (1440)
- List of wars involving Hungary
- List of wars involving the Ottoman Empire
- List of wars involving Poland
