= Slavec =

Slavec Szalóc
- Municipality
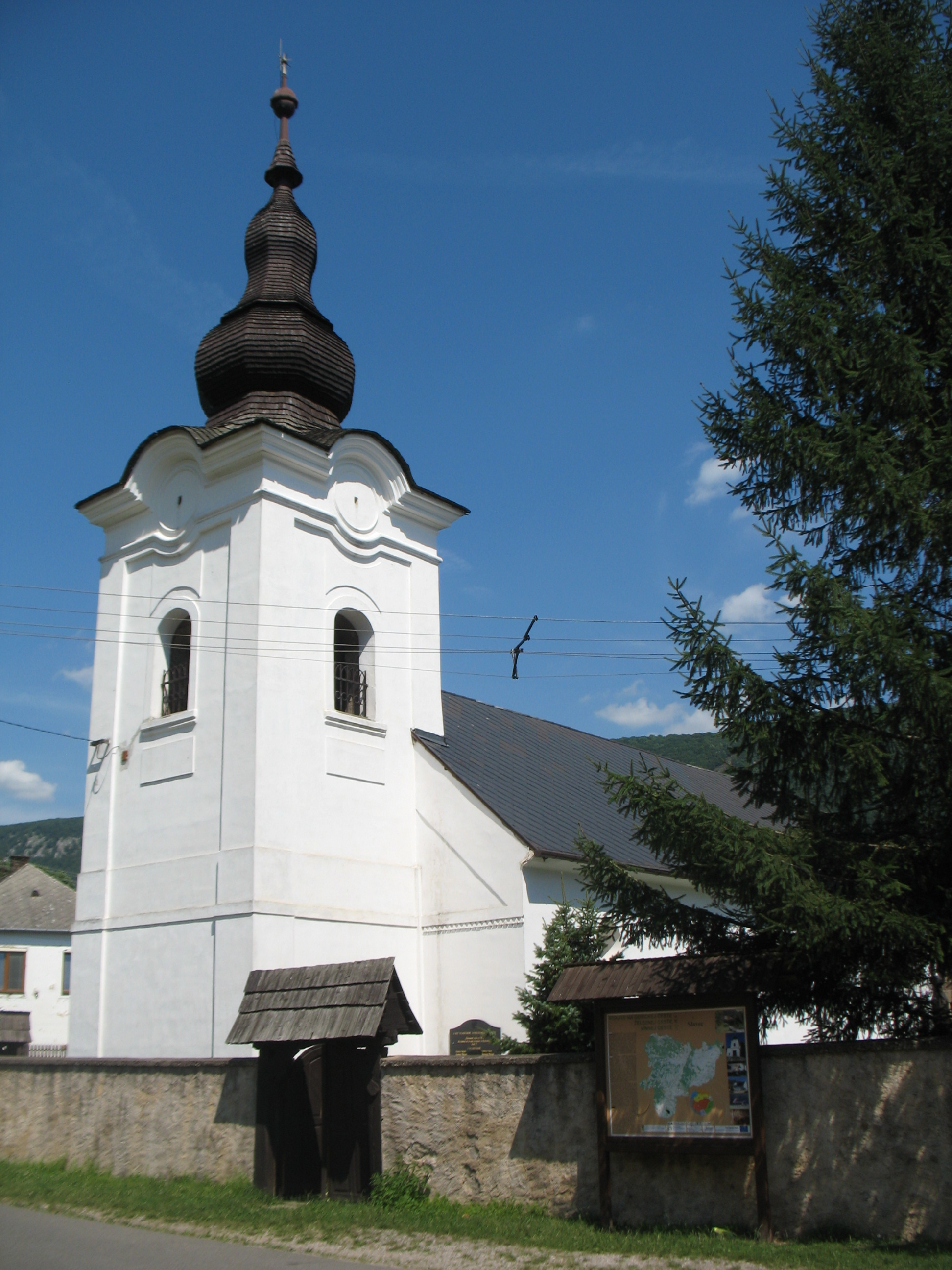

- Flag

- Location of Slavec in the Košice Region Location of Slavec in Slovakia
- Coordinates: 48.58°N 20.48°E
- Country: Slovakia
- Region: Košice Region
- District: Rožňava District
- First mentioned: 1320

Area
  - Total: 17.52 km^{2} (6.76 sq mi)
- Elevation: 230 m (750 ft)

Population (2025)
  - Total: 466
- Time zone: UTC+1 (CET)
  - Summer (DST): UTC+2 (CEST)
- Postal code: 495 1
- Area code: +421 58
- Vehicle registration plate (until 2022): RV
- Website: www.slavec.sk

Slavec (Hungarian: Szalóc) is a village and municipality in the Rožňava District in the Košice Region of middle-eastern Slovakia.

== History ==
In historical records the village was first mentioned in 1320. Before the establishment of independent Czechoslovakia in 1918, Slavec was part of Gömör and Kishont County within the Kingdom of Hungary. From 1938 to 1945, it was again part of Hungary as a result of the First Vienna Award.

== Geography ==
The municipality lies at an altitude of 230 metres (750 ft) and covers an area of 17.52 km^{2} (6.76 sq mi) (2025).

== Population ==
Population statistic (10 years)
Year	1995	2005	2015	2025
Count	481	473	463	466
Difference		−1.66%	−2.11%	+0.64%

Population statistic
Year	2024	2025
Count	467	466
Difference		−0.21%

It has a population of 466 people (31 December 2025).

=== Ethnicity ===
Census 2021 (1+ %)
Ethnicity	Number	Fraction
Hungarian	265	56.02%
Slovak	211	44.6%
Romani	42	8.87%
Not found out	30	6.34%
Total	473	

In year 2021 was 473 people by ethnicity 265 as Hungarian, 211 as Slovak, 42 as Romani, 30 as Not found out, 3 as Czech, 2 as Ukrainian and 1 as Moravian.

Note on population: The difference values of population numbers in the table "Population statistic" and in the sections "Ethnicity" & "Religion" is caused by the use of various statistical methods.

=== Religion ===
Census 2021 (1+ %)
Religion	Number	Fraction
None	202	42.71%
Calvinist Church	133	28.12%
Roman Catholic Church	67	14.16%
Not found out	31	6.55%
Evangelical Church	17	3.59%
Jehovah's Witnesses	6	1.27%
Greek Catholic Church	6	1.27%
Total	473	

In year 2021 was 473 people by religion 202 from None, 133 from Calvinist Church, 67 from Roman Catholic Church, 31 from Not found out, 17 from Evangelical Church, 6 from Jehovah's Witnesses, 6 from Greek Catholic Church, 4 from Other and not ascertained christian church, 4 from Apostolic Church, 2 from Church of the Brethren and 1 from United Methodist Church.

== Culture ==
The village has a public library.
