= Kunova Teplica =

Village and municipality in Slovakia

Kunova Teplica Kuntapolca
- Municipality
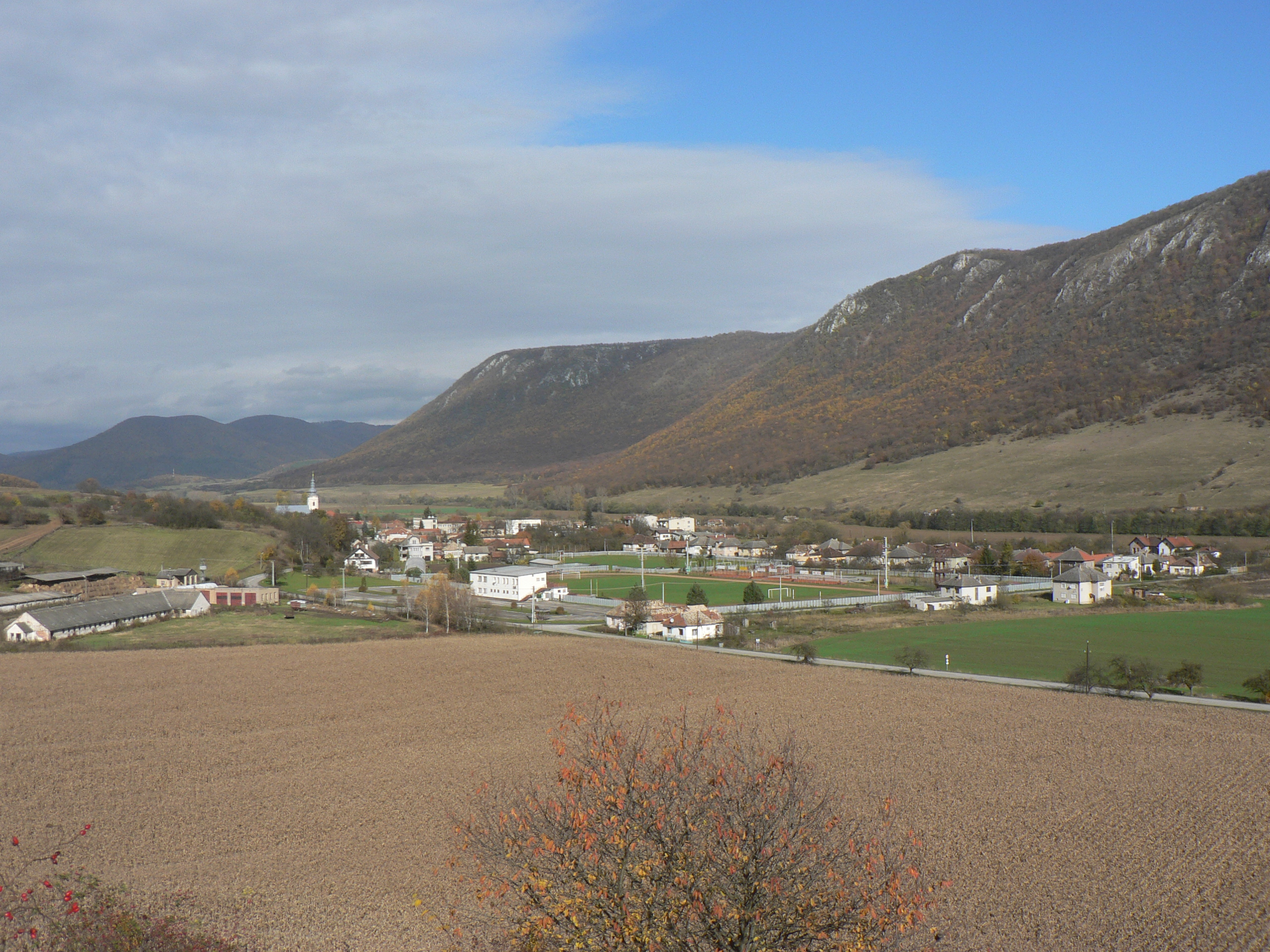

- Flag

- Location of Kunova Teplica in the Košice Region Location of Kunova Teplica in Slovakia
- Coordinates: 48.62°N 20.38°E
- Country: Slovakia
- Region: Košice Region
- District: Rožňava District
- First mentioned: 1243

Area
  - Total: 8.41 km^{2} (3.25 sq mi)
- Elevation: 256 m (840 ft)

Population (2025)
  - Total: 708
- Time zone: UTC+1 (CET)
  - Summer (DST): UTC+2 (CEST)
- Postal code: 493 3
- Area code: +421 58
- Vehicle registration plate (until 2022): RV
- Website: www.kunovateplica.sk

Kunova Teplica (Hungarian: Kuntapolca, German: Teplitz) is a village and municipality in the Rožňava District in the Košice Region of middle-eastern Slovakia.

== History ==
In historical records the village was first mentioned in 1243. Before the establishment of independent Czechoslovakia in 1918, Kunova Teplica was part of Gömör and Kishont County within the Kingdom of Hungary. From 1938 to 1944, it was again part of Hungary as a result of the First Vienna Award.

== Geography ==
The municipality lies at an altitude of 256 metres (840 ft) and covers an area of 8.41 km^{2} (3.25 sq mi) (2025).

== Culture ==
The village has a public library, two football pitches, a kindergarten. In addition, the village also has a cultural centre, which can be rented out to host dances, and parties. It also houses ping pong tables, and a currently inactive library. There is also a school that is situated parallel to the cultural centre, but the school had to be closed down, most likely because of the high influx of gypsy children entering the school. Finally, there is monument dedicated to fallen Hungarian soldiers during the two world wars, it is situated directly in front of the church.

== Population ==
Population statistic (10 years)
| Year | 1995 | 2005 | 2015 | 2025 |
|---|---|---|---|---|
| Count | 678 | 643 | 681 | 708 |
| Difference | | −5.16% | +5.90% | +3.96% |

Population statistic
| Year | 2024 | 2025 |
|---|---|---|
| Count | 709 | 708 |
| Difference | | −0.14% |

It has a population of 708 people (31 December 2025).

=== Ethnicity ===
Census 2021 (1+ %)
| Ethnicity | Number | Fraction |
|---|---|---|
| Slovak | 474 | 64.93% |
| Hungarian | 177 | 24.24% |
| Not found out | 94 | 12.87% |
| Romani | 39 | 5.34% |
| Czech | 11 | 1.5% |
| Total | 730 | |

In year 2021 was 730 people by ethnicity 474 as Slovak, 177 as Hungarian, 94 as Not found out, 39 as Romani, 11 as Czech, 2 as Ukrainian, 1 as German and 1 as Other.

Note on population: The difference values of population numbers in the table "Population statistic" and in the sections "Ethnicity" & "Religion" is caused by the use of various statistical methods.

=== Religion ===
Census 2021 (1+ %)
| Religion | Number | Fraction |
|---|---|---|
| None | 419 | 57.4% |
| Evangelical Church | 105 | 14.38% |
| Not found out | 91 | 12.47% |
| Roman Catholic Church | 42 | 5.75% |
| Jehovah's Witnesses | 27 | 3.7% |
| Calvinist Church | 23 | 3.15% |
| Greek Catholic Church | 15 | 2.05% |
| Total | 730 | |

In year 2021 was 730 people by religion 419 from None, 105 from Evangelical Church, 91 from Not found out, 42 from Roman Catholic Church, 27 from Jehovah's Witnesses, 23 from Calvinist Church, 15 from Greek Catholic Church, 3 from United Methodist Church, 2 from Other and not ascertained christian church, 1 from Old Catholic Church, 1 from Christian Congregations in Slovakia and 1 from Apostolic Church.

Historically, the village has always been primarily white Hungarian. Recently however, Slovak and Roma (Gypsy) immigration has had profound effects on the demographics of the village. There has been an alarming increase of Roma in the village, with their population increasing over 500% in the last two decades, climbing to almost 50% of the total population. In terms of language, most of the village could be classified as bilingual, with both language groups (Slovak and Hungarian) having general understanding of the other.

== Economy ==
The local steel factory situated in the village is its greatest economic contributor, employing not only the locals, but the surrounding area as well. In addition, the village has two soccer fields (a significant feat for a village of such low population). The more recently built soccer field's quality even exceeds that of the largest town in the area, Rožňava. The village also has three grocery stores, two pubs, and a bar.
