= Ardovo =

Municipality in Slovakia

Ardovo Pelsőcardó
- Municipality
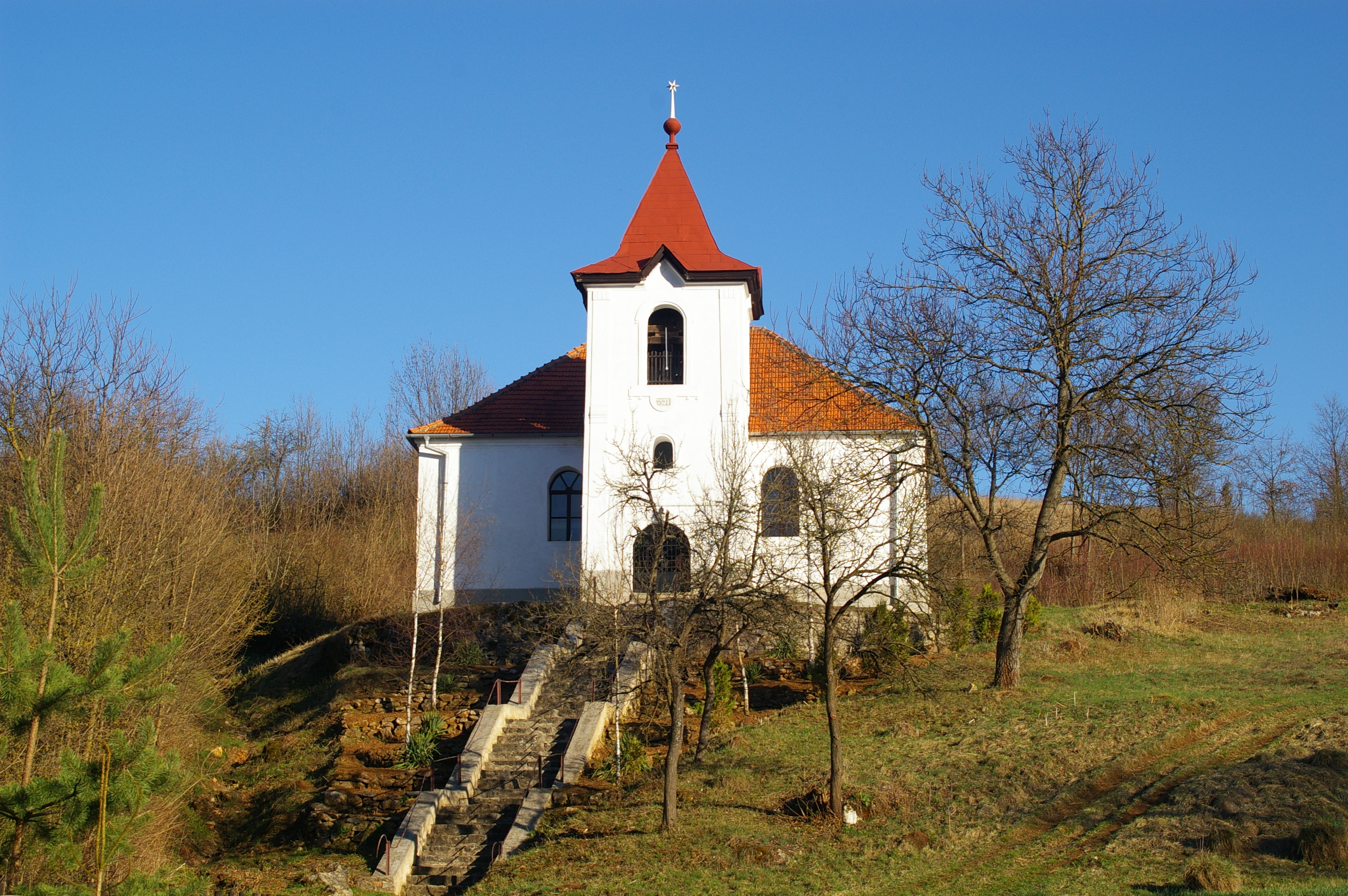

- Flag

- Location of Ardovo in the Košice Region Location of Ardovo in Slovakia
- Coordinates: 48.53°N 20.42°E
- Country: Slovakia
- Region: Košice Region
- District: Rožňava District
- First mentioned: 1293

Government
  - Mayor: Daniel Fábián (Ind.)

Area
  - Total: 11.20 km^{2} (4.32 sq mi)
- Elevation: 268 m (879 ft)

Population (2025)
  - Total: 140
- Time zone: UTC+1 (CET)
  - Summer (DST): UTC+2 (CEST)
- Postal code: 495 5
- Area code: +421 58
- Vehicle registration plate (until 2022): RV
- Website: www.obecardovo.sk

Ardovo (Hungarian: Pelsőcardó) a village and municipality in the Rožňava District in the Košice Region of eastern Slovakia.

== History ==
In historical records the village was first mentioned in 1243. Before the establishment of independent Czechoslovakia in 1918, Ardovo was part of Gömör and Kishont County within the Kingdom of Hungary. From 1938 to 1945, it was again part of Hungary as a result of the First Vienna Award.

== Geography ==
The municipality lies at an altitude of 268 metres (879 ft) and covers an area of 11.20 km^{2} (4.32 sq mi) (2025).

== Population ==
Population statistic (10 years)
Year	1995	2005	2015	2025
Count	177	172	167	140
Difference		−2.82%	−2.90%	−16.16%

Population statistic
Year	2024	2025
Count	144	140
Difference		−2.77%

It has a population of 140 people (31 December 2025).

=== Ethnicity ===
Census 2021 (1+ %)
Ethnicity	Number	Fraction
Slovak	88	55.69%
Hungarian	86	54.43%
Not found out	4	2.53%
Total	158	

In year 2021 was 158 people by ethnicity 88 as Slovak, 86 as Hungarian, 4 as Not found out, 1 as Romani and 1 as Russian.

Note on population: The difference values of population numbers in the table "Population statistic" and in the sections "Ethnicity" & "Religion" is caused by the use of various statistical methods.

=== Religion ===
Census 2021 (1+ %)
Religion	Number	Fraction
None	79	50%
Evangelical Church	33	20.89%
Roman Catholic Church	22	13.92%
Calvinist Church	20	12.66%
Not found out	3	1.9%
Total	158	

In year 2021 was 158 people by religion 79 from None, 33 from Evangelical Church, 22 from Roman Catholic Church, 20 from Calvinist Church, 3 from Not found out and 1 from Eastern Orthodox Church.

== Ethnicity ==
The population is about 99% Slovak in ethnicity.

== Culture ==
The village has a small public library, a post office, a football pitch and a food store.

== Genealogical resources ==
The records for genealogical research are available at the state archive in Košice (Slovak: Štátny archív v Košiciach).

- Roman Catholic church records (births/marriages/deaths): 1825-1895
- Lutheran church records (births/marriages/deaths): 1701-1852 (parish: B), 1852-1895 (parish: C)
- Census records 1869 of Ardovo are not available at the state archive.

== See also ==
- List of municipalities and towns in Slovakia
