= John Komnenos Asen =

Despot of the Principality of Valona circa 1345–1363

- Despot of Valona; Lord of Berat, Vlorë and Kaninë

Despot of Valona
- Reign: c. 1345–1363
- Successor: Alexander Komnenos Asen
- Born: Unknown
- Died: 1363
- Noble family: Sratsimir dynasty
- Spouses: Unknown; Anna Palaiologina
- Issue: Alexander Komnenos Asen; Komnena?
- Father: Sratsimir
- Mother: Keratsa Petritsa

John Komnenos Asen was the ruler of the Principality of Valona from c. 1345 to 1363, initially as a vassal of the Serbian Empire, and after 1355 as a largely independent lord. Descended from high-ranking Bulgarian nobility, John was a brother of both Tsar Ivan Alexander of Bulgaria and Helena of Bulgaria, the wife of Tsar Stephen Dušan of Serbia. Perhaps in search of better opportunities, he emigrated to Serbia, where his sister was married. There, he was granted the title of despot by Stephen Dušan, who placed him in charge of his territories in modern south Albania.

As the despot of Valona, John established commercial ties with Venice and Ragusa, and he became a citizen of the former in 1353. After the death of Dušan in 1355, he took the side of the unsuccessful Simeon Uroš in the ensuing conflict for the Serbian throne. With Venetian assistance, John maintained the essentially independent status of the Principality of Valona. He probably died of the plague in 1363 and he was succeeded by Alexander Komnenos Asen, who was likely his son from his unknown first wife. John's second marriage was to the former Epirote queen-consort Anna Palaiologina.

== Origin and Serbian vassalage ==
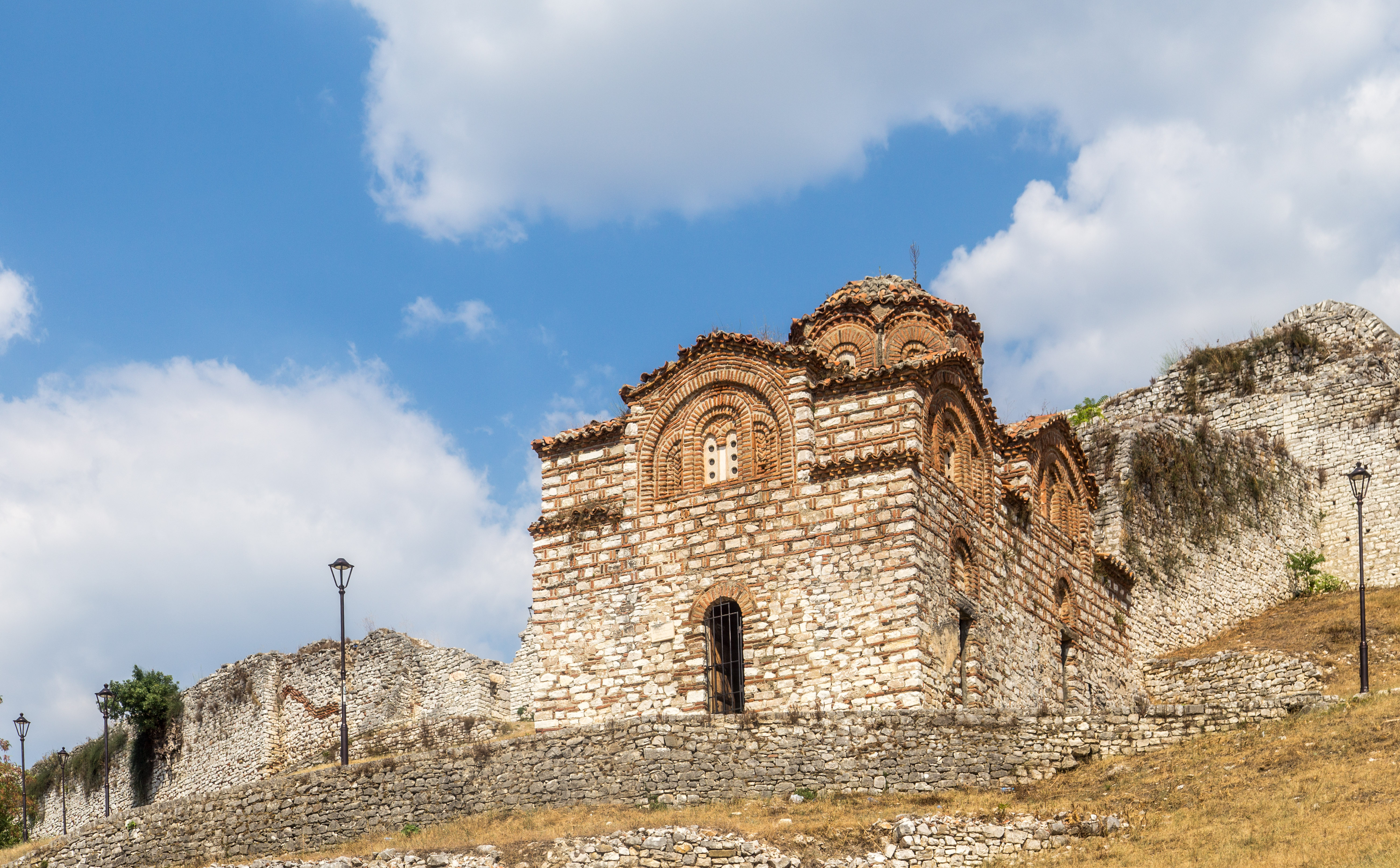
Berat Castle (13th century) was under the rule of John Komnenos Asen in the mid-14th century

While the birth date of John Komnenos Asen is unknown, his origin is clearly documented in the sources. On both sides, he descended from the highest ranks of 14th-century Bulgarian nobility. He was born to Keratsa Petritsa, a daughter of despot Shishman of Vidin, and Sratsimir, the despot of Kran. John's mother was a descendant of the Asen dynasty as a grand granddaughter of Tsar Ivan Asen II. His siblings were Ivan Alexander, who would ascend to the Bulgarian throne in 1331, and Helena, who married Serbian ruler Stephen Dušan in 1332. Even though John was commonly referred to as a Komnenos in the sources, his relations to that Byzantine family are rather scarce. He had rights to that name either through his mother's descent from the Asens, themselves related to the Komnenoi, or through his marriage to Anna Palaiologina.

It is uncertain as to exactly why John emigrated to Serbia instead of assuming a high-ranking position in Bulgaria, as his ancestry and family ties would suggest. Bulgarian historian Ivan Bozhilov is of the opinion that John was not seeking political refuge in Serbia. Instead, it is most likely that he moved to that country with the belief that Serbia's territorial expansion and political influence in that period would secure him better career opportunities. Presumably, John accompanied his sister Helena when she moved to Serbia to marry Stephen Dušan in 1332.

John was first mentioned as the despot of Valona in 1350 and his documented presence in the Albanian lands only dates to 1349. However, he was most likely bestowed the title as early as 1345 or 1346, when Stephen Dušan was proclaimed Emperor (Tsar). American scholar John Fine believes this happened immediately after Stephen Dušan's coronation in 1346. Along with Stephen Dušan's half-brother, Simeon Uroš, and Jovan Oliver, John was one of three people to bear that title under Stephen Dušan.

John was installed as ruler of Valona in late 1345, in the wake of the Serbian conquest of south Albania from the Byzantine Empire, which was concluded no later than August 1345. Besides the Adriatic port of Valona (modern Vlorë), John's appanage included nearby Kanina and the inland castle of Berat to the northeast. Other than that, the extent of his domain is uncertain. Estimates of the area John ruled over range from all of central Albania to only the three cities mentioned, with the rest remaining under the government of local Albanian nobility, who owed allegiance either to John or to Stephen Dušan directly. To the south, John's appanage bordered on the lands of Simeon Uroš, the ruler of Epirus.

== Relations with Venice and independence ==
In 1349, John plundered a Venetian commercial ship which had been shipwrecked on the coast he controlled, in accordance with the medieval principle of jus naufragii. This act necessitated the involvement of Stephen Dušan in order to settle the dispute between Venice and John, as evidenced by an official document from 13 April 1350. Despite this conflict, under John the Principality of Valona was an active partner of Venice and Ragusa (modern Dubrovnik) in maritime commerce. Two receipts from 27 April 1350 document John's role as a mediator in cattle, sugar and pepper trade and reveal that he received significant income from the Valona customs. The customs was profitable because the port was often visited by merchant ships. Even though all of these documents were written in Slavic, John signed his name in Greek, which testifies to his Hellenisation. At the time, John also had ties with the Mamluk rulers of Egypt, who addressed him as “King of Serbia and Bulgaria” in correspondence.

In 1353, John and his family were granted Venetian citizenship, which hints that his domain was under the protection of Venice. The premature death of Stephen Dušan in 1355 plunged the Serbian Empire into civil war. In that conflict, John took the side of his wife's son-in-law Simeon Uroš against the legitimate successor Stephen Uroš, who was Stephen Dušan's son and Simeon Uroš's nephew. While Simeon's attempt at taking the throne was ill-fated and Stephen Uroš even captured Berat in 1356, John managed to preserve his remaining lands and became independent from both Simeon and Stephen Uroš. The threat of Nikephoros II Orsini, who was gaining ground in Thessaly and Epirus, forced John to request the dispatch of a Venetian warship and an administrator from Venice to take control of his domain, to which the republic obliged.

Bulgarian historian Hristo Matanov conjectures that after 1355, John may have minted his own coinage intended for trade with partners outside the inner Balkans. He bases this theory on a new reading of several Latin-language coin inscriptions as Monita despoti Ioanni instead of Monita despoti Oliveri, as previously thought. The new reading, which would identify the coins as being minted by John, was proposed by Yugoslav numismatist Nedeljković, who rejects the initial attribution of these coins to Jovan Oliver.

A commercial document from 30 January 1359, which testifies to John's continuing trade relations with Venice, is chronologically the last reference to his activity in contemporary sources. While the date of his death was not recorded, it is likely that John perished during the plague epidemic which hit Valona and Durazzo (today Durrës) in 1363.

== Family ==
John's possible first marriage probably dates to after his arrival in Serbia, though the identity of his first wife, if any, is unknown. If the next ruler of Valona, Alexander Komnenos Asen, was his son, then he would have been born circa 1346–1348, as he was already an adult in 1363–1366. This would place John's potential first marriage a few years before Alexander's estimated birth. Around 1350–1355, John married Anna Palaiologina, a granddaughter of Byzantine Emperor Michael VIII Palaiologos and a widow of John II Orsini, the despot of Epirus. This marriage to an Epirote noblewoman consolidated and legitimised John's position in the region. Besides Alexander, another very likely child of John Komnenos Asen was a certain Komnina, the wife of Balša II who succeeded Alexander as ruler of Valona in early 1372. According to the Muzaka family chronicle, however, Balša II's wife was Comita Muzaka, a daughter of Andrea II Muzaka, whose family laid claim to the same territories in southern Albania.

== Sources ==
- Fine, John V. A. (1994) [1987]. The Late Medieval Balkans: A Critical Survey from the Late Twelfth Century to the Ottoman Conquest. Ann Arbor, Michigan: University of Michigan Press. ISBN 978-0-472-10079-8.
- Soulis, George Christos (1984). The Serbs and Byzantium During the Reign of Tsar Stephen Dušan (1331–1355) and His Successors. Dumbarton Oaks. ISBN 0-88402-137-8.
- Андреев, Йордан; Лазаров, Иван; Павлов, Пламен (1999). Кой кой е в средновековна България [Who is Who in Medieval Bulgaria] (in Bulgarian). Петър Берон. ISBN 978-954-402-047-7.
- Божилов, Иван (1994). Фамилията на Асеневци (1186–1460). Генеалогия и просопография [The Family of the Asens (1186–1460). Genealogy and Prosopography] (in Bulgarian). София: Издателство на Българската академия на науките. ISBN 954-430-264-6.
- Матанов, Христо (1986). Югозападните български земи през XIV век [The Southwestern Bulgarian Lands in the 14th Century] (in Bulgarian). София: Наука и изкуство. OCLC 246876653.
