= Keratsa Petritsa =

- Spouse: Sratsimir
- Issue: Ivan Alexander of Bulgaria; Helena of Bulgaria, Empress of Serbia; John Komnenos Asen; Michael, despotes of Vidin; Theodora
- House: Shishman
- Father: Shishman of Vidin

Keratsa Petritsa (Bulgarian: Кераца Петрица, transliteration Keraca Petrica; fl. 1300–1337) was a Bulgarian noblewoman (bolyarka), wife of the sebastokrator Sratsimir and mother of the Bulgarian emperor Ivan Alexander and of the Serbian empress consort Helena. The designation "Keratsa Petritsa" is common in historiography but not attested as such in any contemporary source. For the problems around her names, see note below.

Keratsa Petritsa descended in the female line from the Bulgarian emperor Ivan Asen II. She was the sister of Michael Asen III (called Michael Shishman) and Belaur, children of the despotes Shishman of Vidin by an unnamed daughter of sebastokrator Peter and his wife, herself a daughter of Ivan Asen II, variously identified as either Anna/Theodora or Maria. She was also a distant cousin of the Bulgarian emperors Theodore Svetoslav and George Terter II.

Since the 1250s, the area of Vidin had been effectively autonomous under loose Bulgarian overlordship, and was governed successively by Yakov Svetoslav (died 1276), Shishman (died between 1308 and 1313), and then the future Bulgarian emperor Michael Asen III, all of them receiving the highest court title of despotes. On the childless death of his cousin, the young Bulgarian emperor George Terter II in 1323, Michael Asen, the son of Shishman and brother of Keratsa Petritsa, was elected emperor of Bulgaria by the nobility.

Keratsa Petritsa is estimated to have been born in c. 1280. In c. 1300, she married Sratsimir, who eventually became a despotes like his father-in-law Shishman. At some point before 1337, Keratsa Petritsa converted to Roman Catholic Christianity. In that year, Pope Benedict XII (1334–1342) addressed a letter to his "beloved daughter in Christ, the noblewoman Petrissa, ducissae Carnonen(si)," and sought her assistance in bringing her son, the Bulgarian emperor Ivan Alexander, into the Catholic fold. The Latin term ducissa, "duchess," reflects the Byzantine and Bulgarian title of despoina, which Keratsa Petritsa would have borne as wife of the despotes Sratsimir. More contentious is the interpretation of the toponym Carnonen(si) (in another manuscript Carrionen(si), but arguably Carvonen(si) or Carbonen[si]), which has been identified with either Krăn or Karvuna. The relatively recent identification with Karvuna has been accepted by some scholars, who view Sratsimir and Keratsa Petritsa as the rulers of the area prior to Balik and his brothers, with Keratsa Petritsa possibly retaining the territory for a while after her husband's death (in 1330?). A theory that Keratsa Petritsa emigrated to her daughter's court in Serbia is doubtful.

At some point before her death, Keratsa Petritsa converted from Roman Catholicism back to Eastern Orthodoxy, and retired to a convent under the monastic name Theophana. Her memory is honored in the Bulgarian Orthodox Synodikon (Синодик):

To Keratsa, the pious despoina, mother of the great tsar Ivan Alexander, who later adopted an angelic aspect and was called Theophana, eternal memory.

== Issue ==
Keratsa Petritsa married despot Sratsimir, lord of Krăn or Karbona. They had five known children:

- Ivan Alexander, despot, lord of Lovech, who succeeded as emperor of Bulgaria after a coup in 1331.
- Helena, married the Serbian King Stefan Dušan in 1332.
- John Komnenos Asen, despot, made ruler of Valona by his brother-in-law Stefan Dušan of Serbia.
- Shishman, lord of Dubilin, named after his grandfather Shishman I.
- Theodora, lives with his sister Helena at the Serbian royal court.

== Note on the Names ==
"Keratsa Petritsa" (Кераца Петрица) and "Kera Petritsa" (Кера Петрица) are the products of modern historiography and are nowhere attested in such a combination in the primary sources. The medieval Bulgarian Synodikon of Boril refers to her as the despoina Keratsa (деспотица Кераца) and as nun Theophana (Өеофана, modern Bulgarian Теофана, Teofana). In the letter of Pope Benedict XII, she is called Petrissa, which is rendered in Bulgarian as Petritsa (Петрица, Petrica), ostensibly a diminutive of Petra (Петра, Petra). Although some have treated "Keratsa" as a proper name, there is general agreement that "Keratsa" and "Kiratsa" are diminutives of the Greek title kyra ("Lady") and play the role of an honorific attached to, and sometimes substituted for, the proper name. The Bulgarian historian Andreev has argued that the princess originally bore a double name, of which Keratsa was the first element, before assuming the name Petritsa upon joining the Roman Catholic Church, before changing back to original name on her return to Eastern Orthodoxy, and the final assumption of the monastic name Theophana (Teofana). On the basis of the monastic name and common practice, in which monastic names tended to begin with the same letter or sound as the original secular name, Andreev proposes that the second element of the original name would have been Theodora (Teodora). Mladjov, on the other hand, considers Keratsa a honorific prefixed to the proper name, Petrica as possibly the Catholic name (in agreement with Andreev), and restores the original proper name on the basis of the monastic name Teofana as probably Tamara rather than Teodora, because she had a daughter named Teodora, and Bulgarian practice at the time avoided giving mother and daughter the same name; while the name Teodora would clash with that of her daughter Teodora, the name Tamara would be reflected, as expected, in the name of her eldest granddaughter Tamara.

== Sources ==
- Андреев, Йордан (2005). "Някои бележки около личността на деспотица Кераца, майката на цар Иван Александър," Българските земи през средновековието 3/1 (2005) 87–91.
- Атанасов, Георги (2009). Добруджанското деспотство, Велико Търново.
- Божилов, Иван (1985). Фамилията на Асеневци : (1185-1460): Генеалогия и просопография. Изд-во на БАН Марин Дринов.
- Божилов, Иван (1998). История на България / Иван Божилов, и др. Абагар.
- Божилов, И., В. Гюзелев 2006. История на средновековна България VII–XIV век, София.
- Димитрова, Мариана, Румяна Радушева, Светослав Савов (1996). "Няколко бележки около личността на Кераца Петрица, майката на цар Иван-Александър," Епохи (1996/3) 122-128.
- Дуйчев, И. (1937). "Неиздадено писмо на папа Бенедикт XII до майката на цар Иван Александър," Известия на българското историческо дружество 14–15 (1937) 205–210.
- Златарски, Александър (2006). Закъснялото завръщане в Европа. Izdatelsko atelie Ab.
- Матанов, Христо (1987). "Нови сведения за родственици на деспот Елтимир /Алдимир/," ГСУ.НЦСВПИД 81 (1987) 107–113.
- Младенов, Момчил (2013). "Папството в Авиньон, Византия и България," Балканите - език, история, култура 3 (2013) 65-79.
- Младенов, Момчил (2020). "Преди трона: ранните години на цар Иван Александър Асен (1331–1371)," България, българите и Европа - мит, история, съвремие 14 (2020) 120-133.
- Mladjov, Ian (2012). "The children of Ivan Asen II and Eirēnē Komnēnē: A contribution to the prosopography of medieval Bulgaria," Bulgaria Mediaevalis 3 (2012) 485-500.
- Mladjov, Ian (2015). "Monarchs' Names and Numbering in the Second Bulgarian State," Studia Ceranea 5 (2015) 267-310.
- Николова, Бистра (2009). "Монахиня Теофана (два въпроса около личността и конфесията на Кераца)," Минало 4 (2015) 43-47.
- Petkov, Kiril (2008). The Voices of Medieval Bulgaria, Seventh–Fifteenth Century, Leiden.
- Шаранков, Николай (2017). "Ямболският надпис на господин Шишман, брат на цар Йоан Александър, от 1356/1357 г.," Bulgaria Mediaevalis 8 (2017) 251-274.
