= Andronikos Angelos =

Andronikos Angelos (Greek: Ἀνδρόνικος Ἄγγελος) can refer to:

- Andronikos Doukas Angelos (c. 1133–before 1185), Byzantine aristocrat, father of emperors Alexios III and Isaac II
- Andronikos Angelos Palaiologos (1282–1328), Byzantine military commander
