= Helena of Bulgaria, Empress of Serbia =

Bulgarian princess

Helena of Bulgaria
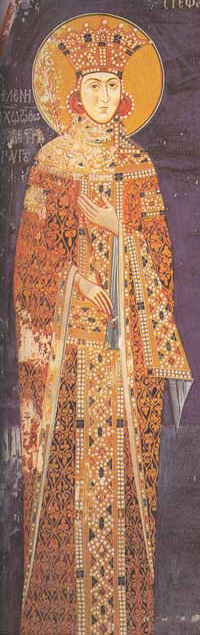
- Fresco of Helena in the Lesnovo Monastery

Queen consort of Serbia
- Tenure: 1332–1346

Empress consort of Serbia
- Tenure: 1346–1355

Tsaritsa regnant of the Principality of Serres
- Reign: 1355–1365
- Successor: Jovan Uglješa (as Despot)
- Born: c. 1315; Second Bulgarian Empire
- Died: 7 November 1374 (aged 58–59); Prizren, District of Branković
- Spouse: Stefan Dušan
- Issue: Stefan Uroš V Theodora Uroš; Irina Uroš (disputed)
- House: Sratsimir
- Father: Sratsimir
- Mother: Keratsa Petritsa
- Religion: Serbian Orthodox/Bulgarian Orthodox

Helena of Bulgaria (Bulgarian: Елена, Serbian: Јелена; c. 1315 –7 November 1374) was a Bulgarian princess, and the Queen and Empress (Tsaritsa) consort of Serbia by marriage to Serbian King and later Emperor Stefan Dušan (r. 1331–55). She was a regent of Serbia in 1355 and 1356 for her son Stefan Uroš V. After retiring from political life she became a nun and is venerated as a saint in the Orthodox Church under her monastic name as Saint Elizabeth.

== Life ==
Elena Sratsimir is a descendant of three prestigious medieval Balkan ruling families – the Komnenоs, the Asenides and the Shishmanides. She is the daughter of the despot Sratsimir and Keratsa Petritsa and the granddaughter of Shishman I, ruler of Vidin. Her uncle is Tsar Michael III Shishman Asen. Elena is the sister of Tsar Ivan Alexander and despot John Komnenos Asen, ruler of Kanina and Valona. Through her grandmother's line, she is a descendant of Tsar Ivan Asen II and his wife Irene Komnina through their daughter Anna-Theodora. On the family tree on the frescoes of the Church of the Holy Virgin in Matejce, Tsaritsa Elena, Tsar Uroš V, and probably Elena's sister – Theodora, are presented (unlike all other genealogical trees of the Serbian dynasty) not as representatives of the Nemanjić dynasty, but as descendants of the Asenides –Komnenos family.

Stefan Dušan was crowned King of Serbia at Svrčin on 8 September 1331 (Nativity of the Theotokos). A year later, most likely 26 April 1332 (Thomas Sunday), Dušan married Helena. Previously, it was erroneously assumed that the marriage took place on Easter (19 April), however, marriages are not instituted on Easter in the Orthodox Church. Their wedding night was held at the royal court in Skopje. The marriage was arranged as part of the peace agreement between Bulgaria and Serbia. This marriage provided one son, Stefan Uroš V, a daughter, Theodora, who became a consort of Ottoman Sultan Orhan when she was twelve and Orhan seventy, and possibly one other daughter, named Irina or Irene. According to John V. A. Fine, she is the same "Irene" who was wife of Gregorios Preljub, the Serbian governor of Thessaly who died in late 1355 or early 1356. They were parents to Thomas II Preljubović, Ruler of Epirus from 1367 to 1384. Irene married secondly to Radoslav Hlapen, lord of Kastoria and Edessa.

Helena lived in the Republic of Venice in 1350. On her husband's death in 1355, Helena inherited part of Bulgarian lands between the lower Vardar and the Mesta. She also received the Chalcidic peninsula, basing her court at Serres. She was a regent of Serbia between 1355 and 1356 for her son.

Her own principality she built up was neutral and autonomous. In a charter from 1360 to 1361, with which Tsar Uroš confirms gifts to Tsaritsa Helena for the Hilandar Monastery, there is a note after the signature: "Lady the Holy Tsaritsa rules alone in Serres." In 1359, Helena became a nun under the monastic name Jelisaveta (Serbian: Јелисавета). However, she continued to play an active role in politics, governing the Principality of Serres until 1365. After that, she retired from political life, overseeing reconstruction and renovation of several monastic communities, until her death in 1374. Queen Helena died on November 7, 1374, the date of her death is given in a Hilendar manuscript.

== Legacy ==
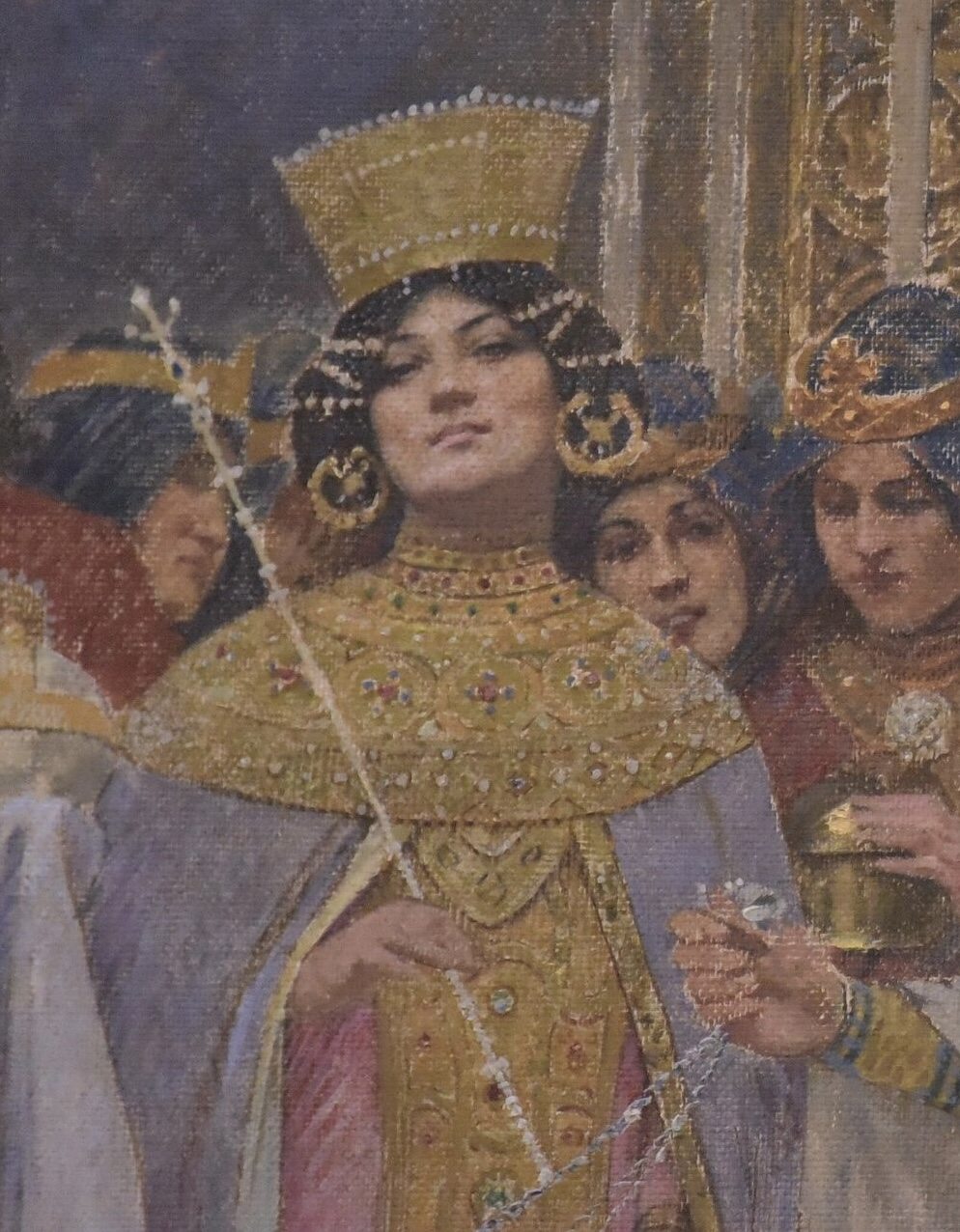
Helena by Paja Jovanović, 1900

After her death, she was canonized as a saint under the name of St. Elizabeth and her relics are venerated. According to the Bulgarian historian Plamen Pavlov, today one of her hands is kept in silver box in the Savina monastery near the town of Herceg Novi on the Bay of Kotor in Montenegro and is virtually unknown in Bulgaria. The relics ended up there in 1759, and before that it is possible that they were in the monastery Tvrdoš Monastery near Trebinje in Bosnia and Herzegovina.

== Sources ==
- Ćirković, Sima (2004). The Serbs. Malden: Blackwell Publishing.
- Fine, John Van Antwerp Jr. (1994) [1987]. The Late Medieval Balkans: A Critical Survey from the Late Twelfth Century to the Ottoman Conquest. Ann Arbor, Michigan: University of Michigan Press.
- Purković, Miodrag Al (1975). Jelena: žena cara Dušana. Izdanje Srpske pravoslavne eparhije za zapadnu Evropu.
- Soulis, George Christos (1984). The Serbs and Byzantium during the reign of Tsar Stephen Dušan (1331-1355) and his successors. Washington: Dumbarton Oaks Library and Collection.
- Nicol, Donald M. (1984). The Despotate of Epiros, 1267–1479: A Contribution to the History of Greece in the Middle Ages. Cambridge: Cambridge University Press. ISBN 978-0-521-13089-9.
- Матанов, Христо [in Bulgarian] (1986). Югозападните български земи през XIV век (in Bulgarian). София: Наука и изкуство.

Royal titles
Preceded by Maria Palaiologina	Queen consort of Serbia; 1332–1346	Succeeded by Empress
New creation Serbian Empire	Empress consort of Serbia; 1346–1355	Succeeded by Anna Basaraba
