= Anna Palaiologina (daughter of Andronikos Angelos Palaiologos) =

- Lady of Valona

Queen consort of Epirus
- Tenure: after 1324 – 1335

Regent of Epirus
- Tenure: 1337–1338
- Born: Anna Palaiologina; 14th century
- Spouse: John II Orsini; John Komnenos Asen
- Issue: Nikephoros II Orsini; Thomais Komnene Angelina
- House: Angelos
- Father: Andronikos Angelos Palaiologos

Anna Palaiologina (Greek: Ἅννα Παλαιολογίνα) was a queen-consort (basilissa) of the Despotate of Epirus as wife of John II Orsini. She was regent for her son Nikephoros II Orsini in 1337–1338. She later married the Lord of Valona, John Komnenos Asen.

== Life ==
She was a daughter of a Byzantine aristocrat, the protovestiarios Andronikos Angelos Palaiologos, a grandson of the ruler of Epirus, Michael II Komnenos Doukas, and of the Byzantine emperor Michael VIII Palaiologos. She married the despot of Epirus, John II Orsini, in c. 1323. Together the couple had a son, Nikephoros, and a daughter, Thomais.

She poisoned her husband in 1337, and assumed the regency over her underage son, only for Epirus to be invaded and annexed by the Byzantines in 1338. Anna was carried off as a prisoner to Thessalonica, from where she escaped in 1341. She managed to reach the Epirote capital of Arta, but the local Byzantine governor, John Angelos, placed her under house arrest.

When Epirus was conquered by the Serbians under Stefan Dušan in c. 1347, Anna was set free. In c. 1350 she married the lord of Valona, John Komnenos Asen. Sometime after c. 1363 she went to live with her daughter Thomais and her son-in-law, Simeon Uroš, at the latter's capital of Trikala.

== Sources ==
- Trapp, Erich; Beyer, Hans-Veit; Walther, Rainer; Sturm-Schnabl, Katja; Kislinger, Ewald; Leontiadis, Ioannis; Kaplaneres, Sokrates (1976–1996). Prosopographisches Lexikon der Palaiologenzeit (in German). Vienna: Verlag der Österreichischen Akademie der Wissenschaften. ISBN 3-7001-3003-1.
