= Despotate of Lovech =

Bulgarian medieval state centered in Lovech (1330–1446)

Despotate of Lovech Деспотство Ловеч (Bulgarian) Despotstvo Lovech (Bulgarian)
- 1330–1446
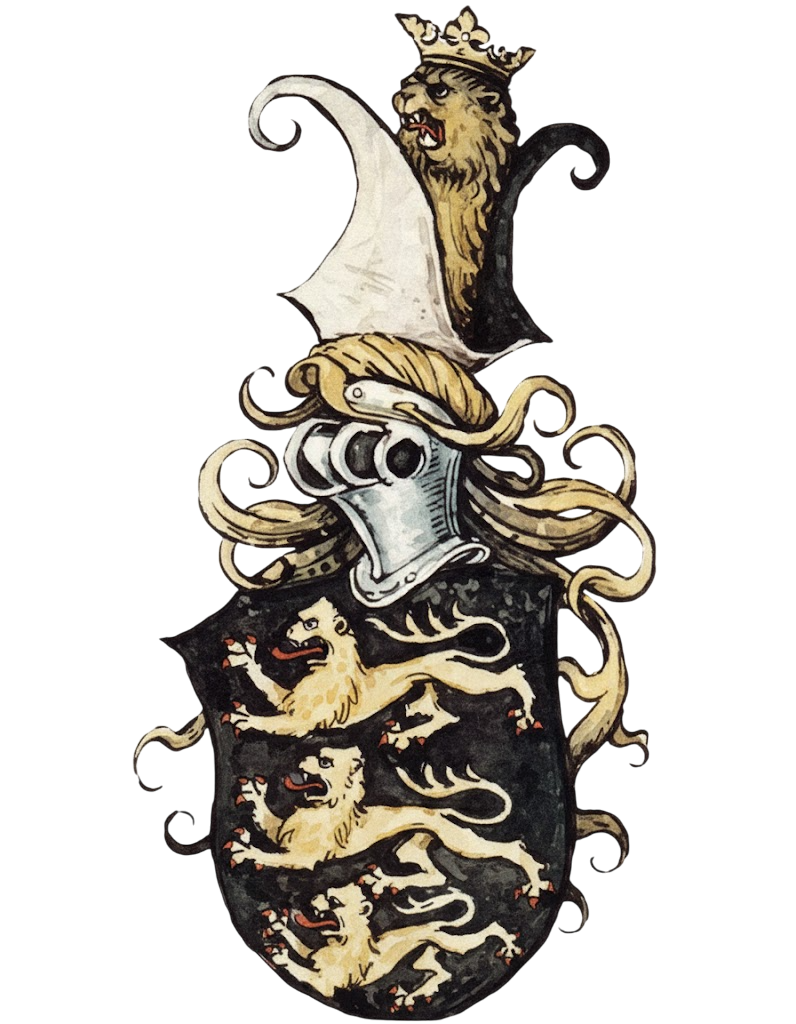
- Coat of arms (14th century)
- Status: Despotate
- Capital and largest city: Lovech; 43°08′05″N 24°43′02″E
- Common languages: Middle Bulgarian
- Religion: Bulgarian Orthodoxy
- Government: Monarchy
- Despot
  - 1330–1371*1402-1446: Ivan Alexander Fruzhin of Bulgaria
- Historical era: Middle Ages
  - Appointment of Ivan Alexander: 1330
  - Conquest by the Ottomans: 1446
- Currency: Various coins
Preceded by	Succeeded by
Second Bulgarian Empire	Ottoman Empire
- Today part of: Bulgaria

The Despotate of Lovech (Bulgarian: Деспотство Ловеч, romanized: Despotstvo Lovech), was a Bulgarian state, covering parts of the territory of what is now Lovech Province, formed in 1330 after Ivan Alexander was appointed to govern Lovech, the capital of the despotate, and the nearby area around the town. It was dissolved after the fall of the Lovech Fortress in 1446 to the Ottomans.

The state was the last independent Bulgarian state after 1396, before its conquest by the Ottoman Empire. It was ruled by the Sratsimir dynasty.

== History ==
=== Formation ===
The despotate was formed after Ivan Alexander became the despot, most likely being appointed due to Lovech being a major town that controlled commercial passage through the Stara Planina passes, and the migration of intellectuals to Moldavia and Wallachia, due to Ottoman conquests.

=== Period of prosperity ===
The area was the center for many Bulgarian rulers. In the 14th century, the commercial, administrative, and spiritual centers were at their peak. The despot also made a great contribution towards stopping the Serbian advance, although Bulgaria still lost the Battle of Velbazhd. Ivan married Princess Theodora of Wallachia. He gradually won trust to become the elected Tsar of Bulgaria in 1331, after Ivan Stefan was driven out by a coup d'état, and the conspirators placed him on the throne.

=== Dissolution ===
Ivan Alexander died on 17 February 1371. Despite his early years of success, his later decisions, such as splitting the empire among his sons in 1356, left the Bulgarian states to face outside powers politically divided and weakened, contributing to the fall of the despotate. The Ottoman invasions of Bulgaria in the 14th century did not directly result in the fall of the despotate. The Turkish traveller Kâtip Çelebi testified the late conquest of Lovech. He mentioned that the city was conquered in 1446, This was confirmed by the Armenian travel writer Hugaz Indzedzyan according to whom "Lovech had been conquered in 1446 by Sultan Fatih Mehmed."

== See also ==
- Lovech
- Lovech Fortress
- Second Bulgarian Empire
- Lovech Municipality
- Lovech Province
- Sratsimir dynasty
- Ivan Alexander of Bulgaria
- History of Bulgaria
