= Sratsimir =

Bulgarian magnate and despot of Kran

- Despot
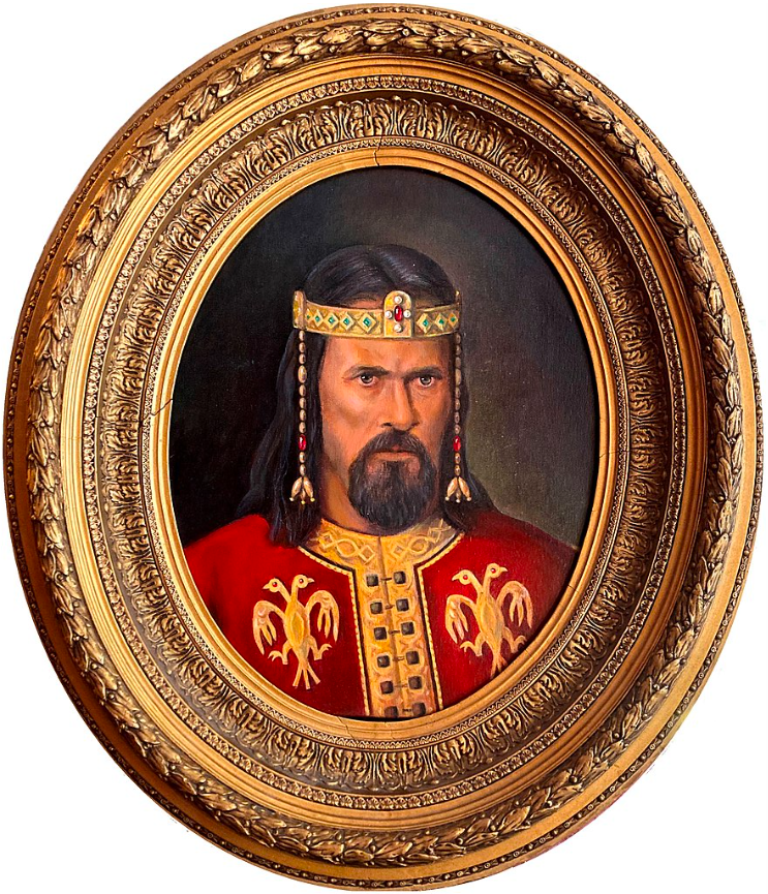
- Spouse: Keratsa Petritsa
- Issue: Ivan Alexander; Helena of Bulgaria; John Komnenos Asen; Michael, Despot of Vidin; Theodora
- House: Sratsimir

Sratsimir (Bulgarian: Срацимир, Sracimir; fl. 1324–31) was the father of the Bulgarian Emperor Ivan Alexander (1331–1371).

Sratsimir was a Bulgarian magnate with the highest court title of Despot, holding the territory of either Kran or Karvuna (Balchik or Kranevo). The lack of certainty over the placement of Sratsimir's holdings is due to the nature of the sparse source evidence, which is derived from a letter from Pope Benedict XII to Sratsimir's wife or widow Petritsa from 1337, which titles her duchissa Carnonen[sis] or Carbonen[sis]. It is unclear when and from whom Sratsimir received his title and governorship, but it has been proposed that they were granted by the Bulgarian Emperor Theodore Svetoslav (1299–1322). or by Sratsimir's brother-in-law, the Bulgarian Emperor Michael Asen III, called Michael Shishman (1323–1330); at any rate, he held them before the accession of his son on the Bulgarian throne in 1331.

Sratsimir's origins remain unclear, but it has been suggested that he belonged to the House of Terter. His brothers Radoslav and Dimitar are mentioned, as well as a cousin or uncle who bore the monastic name Samuel. A possible additional brother named Vladislav was mentioned in church memorial lists. The name Sratsimir was borne by several other individuals, most of them apparent kinsmen of the Despot Sratsimir.

It has been suggested that Sratsimir bore a two-element name, Ivan Sratsimir, and that he was referred to under the first element, Ivan (Ioan) as ruler of Varna on an Italian map from 1322. Sratsimir had married Petritsa, known by the title Keratsa, a sister of the Bulgarian Emperor Michael Asen III (called Michael Shishman), and a member of the House of Shishman. They had five children. Sratsimir was the eponymous founder of the House of Sratsimir.

== Issue ==
- Ivan Alexander, Despot of Lovech, who ascended on the throne as emperor of Bulgaria after a coup d'état in 1331.
- Helena, who married the Serbian King, later Emperor Stefan Dušan in 1332.
- John Komnenos Asen, who was made Despot of Valona by his brother-in-law Stefan Dušan of Serbia.
- Michael, Despot of Vidin
- Theodora

== Sources ==
- Андреев, Йордан; Лазаров, Иван; Павлов, Пламен (1999). Кой кой е в средновековна България [Who is Who in Medieval Bulgaria] (in Bulgarian). Петър Берон. pp. 9–10, 351. ISBN 978-954-402-047-7.
- T︠S︡onko Enev (1997). Vladetelskite namestnit︠s︡i na Bŭlgarii︠a︡, VII-XIX vek. p. xv.
