= Demetrios Doukas Komnenos Koutroules =

Son of Michael II Komnenos Doukas

Demetrios Doukas Komnenos Koutroules Angelos
- Noble family: Komnenodoukai
- Spouses: Anna Komnene Palaiologina; Ana Terter
- Issue: Andronikos Angelos Palaiologos; Constantine Angelos Palaiologos; Unnamed wife of Alexios Raoul
- Father: Michael II Komnenos Doukas
- Mother: Theodora of Arta

Demetrios, later renamed Michael, Doukas Komnenos Koutroules Angelos (Greek: Δημήτριος (Μιχαήλ) Δούκας Κομνηνός Κουτρούλης Ἄγγελος; fl. 1278–1304) was the third son of the ruler of Epirus, Michael II Komnenos Doukas (ruled 1230–68), also surnamed Koutroules, and his wife Theodora of Arta.

In 1278, he married Anna Komnene Palaiologina, the daughter of the Byzantine emperor Michael VIII Palaiologos (r. 1259–82), and received from his father-in-law the supreme dignity of Despot. From this marriage, he had two sons, Andronikos and Constantine. From a second marriage to a daughter of George I Terter, Tsar of Bulgaria, he had several children more.

He is mentioned as fighting in the ranks of the Byzantine army against the troops of Charles of Anjou in the Siege of Berat, as well as twenty years later against the Alans. In 1304, he was accused of conspiring against Emperor Andronikos II Palaiologos (r. 1282–1328) and was imprisoned. Nothing further is known of him.

== Sources ==
- Guilland, Rodolphe (1959). "Recherches sur l'histoire administrative de l'Empire byzantin: Le despote, δεσπότης". Revue des études byzantines (in French). 17: 52–89. doi:10.3406/rebyz.1959.1199.
- Trapp, Erich; Beyer, Hans-Veit; Walther, Rainer; Sturm-Schnabl, Katja; Kislinger, Ewald; Leontiadis, Ioannis; Kaplaneres, Sokrates (1976–1996). Prosopographisches Lexikon der Palaiologenzeit (in German). Vienna: Verlag der Österreichischen Akademie der Wissenschaften. ISBN 3-7001-3003-1.
