= Despot (court title) =

Byzantine imperial title

- δεσπότης
- Seal of Demetrios Palaiologos, Despot of the Morea in 1449–1460, with the inscription "Demetrios, in Christ the God Faithful, Despot, the Palaiologos, Born-in-the-purple"

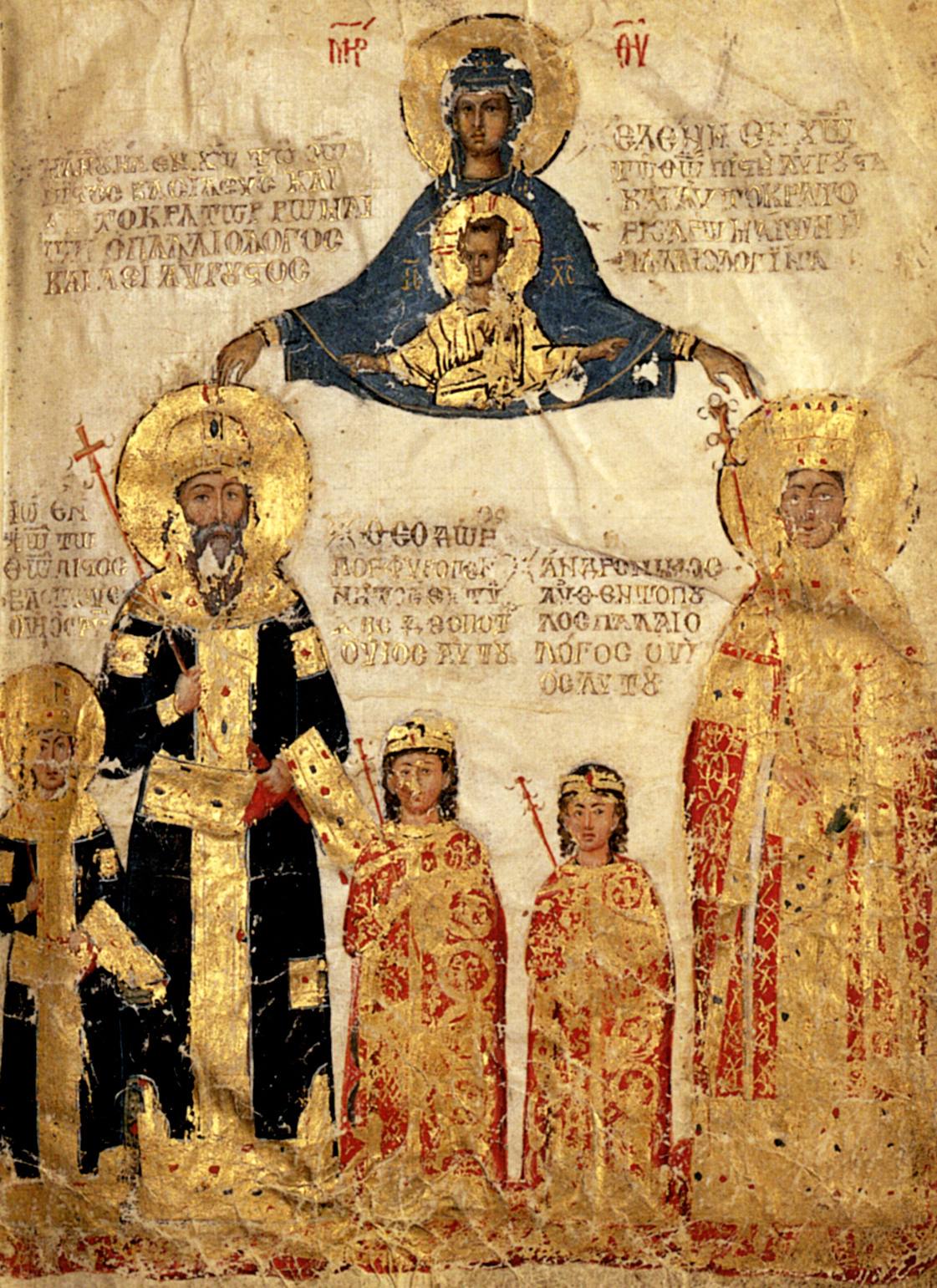
- Despots Theodore and Andronikos Palaiologos (centre) flanked by their father Manuel II Palaiologos (left) and mother Helena Dragaš (right), with their elder brother John VIII (far left).
- Style: My despot (Δέσποτά μου); Your Majesty (Ἡ βασιλεία σου); My/our Authentopoulos (Ὁ αὐθεντόπουλός μου/μας)
- Member of: Byzantine Imperial Family
- Seat: Constantinople; Morea; Thessaloniki; Selymbria
- Appointer: Byzantine emperor
- Term length: Life tenure
- Formation: 1163
- First holder: Béla-Alexios
- Final holder: Demetrios and Thomas Palaiologos
- Abolished: 29 May 1460
- Succession: First

Despot or despotes (Note: Literally "master of the house", from PIE *dṓm-, "house", and *pótis; cf. Greek pósis and Latin, Sanskrit pátis, "lord". Despoina, i.e. "potnia of the house", is a feminine counterpart to the word. Despot is thought to be attested – on the PY Tn 316 tablet – in Mycenaean Greek Linear B as 𐀈𐀡𐀲, do-po-ta.) was a senior Byzantine court title that was bestowed on the sons or sons-in-law of reigning emperors, and initially denoted the heir-apparent of the Byzantine emperor.

From Byzantium it spread throughout the late medieval Balkans and was also granted in the states under Byzantine cultural influence, such as the Latin Empire, the Second Bulgarian Empire, the Serbian Empire and its successor states (Bulgarian and Serbian: деспот, romanized: despót), and the Empire of Trebizond. With the political fragmentation of the period, the term gave rise to several principalities termed "despotates" which were ruled either as independent states or as appanages by princes bearing the title of despot; most notably the Despotate of Epirus, the Despotate of the Morea, the Despotate of Dobruja and the Serbian Despotate.

In modern usage, the word has taken a different meaning: "despotism" is a form of government in which a single entity rules with absolute power. The semantic shift undergone by the term is mirrored by "tyrant", an ancient Greek word that originally bore a neutral connotation, and the Latin "dictator", a constitutionally sanctioned office of the Roman Republic. In colloquial Modern Greek, the word is often used to refer to a bishop. In English, the feminine form of the title is despotess (from Ancient Greek: δεσπότισσα, romanized: despótissa; Bulgarian: деспотица, romanized: despotítsa; Serbian: деспотица/despotica), which denoted the spouse of a despot, but the transliterated traditional female equivalent of despotes, despoina (Ancient Greek: δέσποινα, romanized: déspoina, lit. 'lady of the house'), is also commonly used.

== Origin and history ==
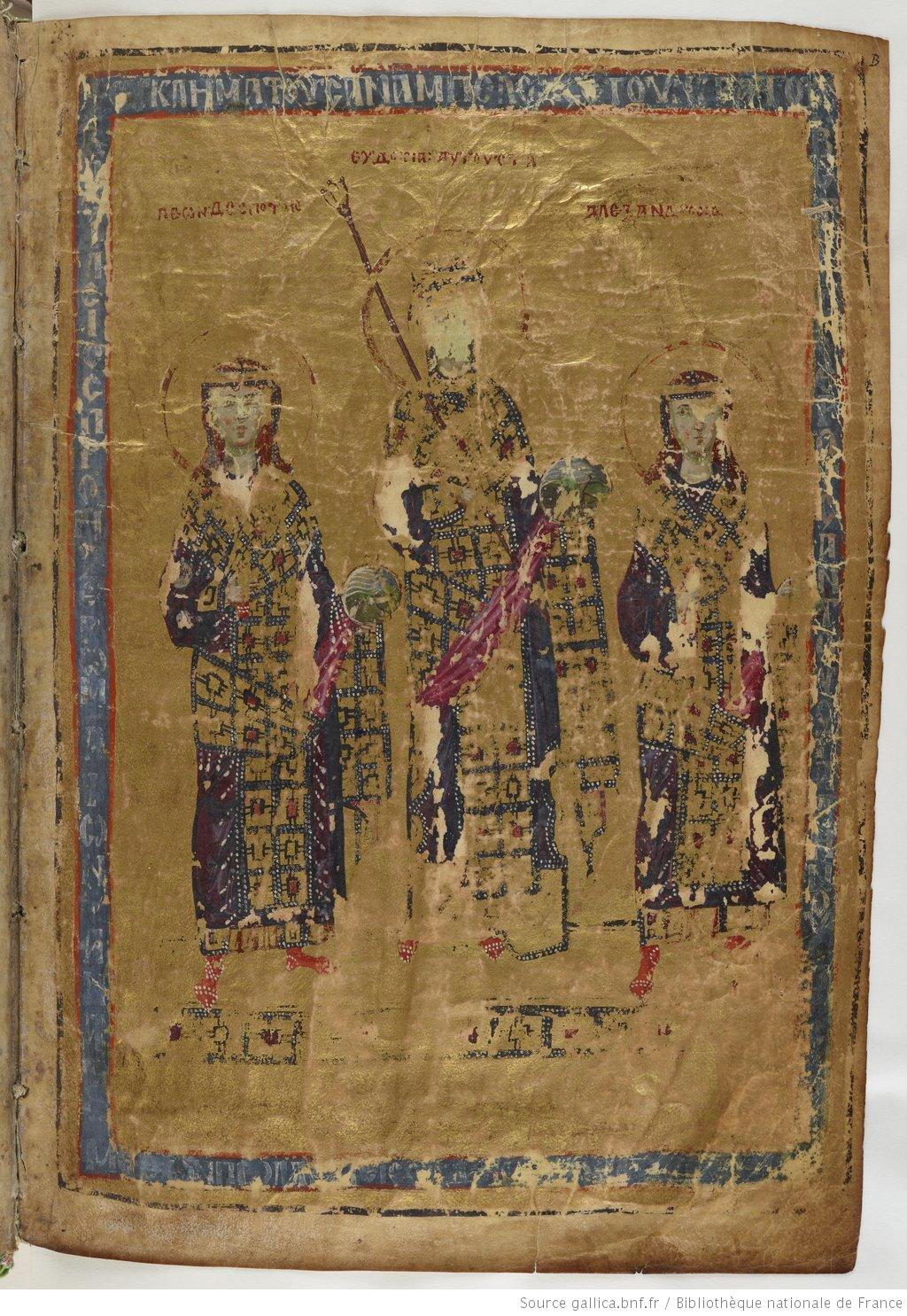
Empress Eudokia Ingerina with her sons Leo VI (left) and Alexander (right), both called despotes (ΔECΠOTHC)

The original Greek term δεσπότης (despotes) meant simply 'lord' and was synonymous with κύριος (kyrios). As the Greek equivalent to the Latin dominus, despotes was initially used as a form of address indicating respect. As such it was applied to any person of rank, but in a more specific sense to God (e.g. Revelation 6:10), bishops and the patriarchs, and primarily the Roman and Byzantine Emperors. Occasionally it was used in formal settings, for example on coins (since Leo III the Isaurian) or formal documents. During the 8th and 9th centuries, co-emperors appear on coinage with the address despotes, but this was still a mark of respect rather than an official title. (Note: The co-emperors Staurakios, Theophylact, Symbatios Constantine, Theophilos and Michael III are all titled despotes on coinage, but literary sources also record an imperial coronation for most of them.) Senior emperors were also occasionally addressed as despotes. Before the 12th century, the honorific was used interchangeably with the more formal title of basileus.

Although it was used for high-ranking nobles from the early 12th century, the title of despot began being used as a specific court title by Manuel I Komnenos, who conferred it in 1163 to the future King Béla III of Hungary, the Emperor's son-in-law and, until the birth of Alexios II in 1169, heir-presumptive. According to the contemporary Byzantine historian John Kinnamos, the title of despot was analogous to Béla's Hungarian title of urum, or heir-apparent.

From this time and until the end of the Byzantine Empire, the title of despot became the highest Byzantine dignity, which placed its holders "immediately after the emperor" (Rodolphe Guilland). Nevertheless, the Byzantine emperors from the Komnenoi to the Palaiologoi, as well as the Latin Emperors who claimed their succession and imitated their styles, continued to use the term despotes in its more generic sense of 'lord' in their personal seals and in imperial coinage. In a similar manner, the holders of the two immediately junior titles of sebastokrator and Caesar could be addressed as despota (δεσπότα). The despot shared with the Caesar another appellatory epithet, eutychestatos (εὐτυχέστατος, 'most fortunate') or paneutychestatos (πανευτυχέστατος, 'most fortunate of all').

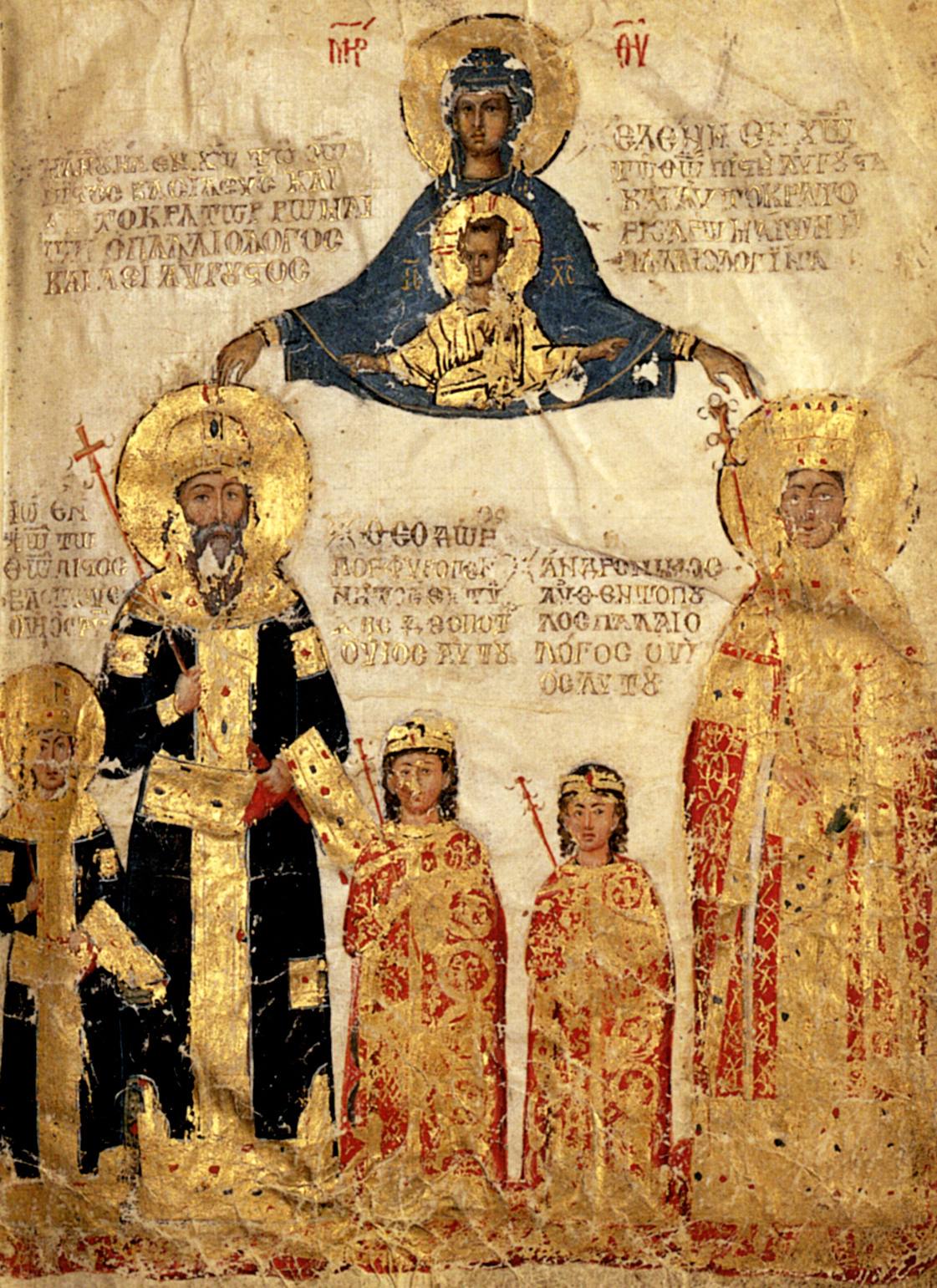
Emperor Manuel II Palaiologos with his family: empress Helena Dragaš (right), and three of their sons, the co-emperor John VIII and the despots Andronikos and Theodore

During the last centuries of Byzantium's existence, the title was awarded to the younger sons of emperors (the eldest sons were usually crowned as co-emperors, with the title of basileus) as well as to the emperor's sons-in-law (gambroi). The title entailed extensive honours and privileges, including the control of large estates – the domains of Michael VIII's brother John Palaiologos for instance included the islands of Lesbos and Rhodes – to finance their extensive households. Like the junior titles of sebastokrator and Caesar however, the title of despot was strictly a courtly dignity, and was not tied to any military or administrative functions or powers. Women could not hold a noble title, but bore the titles of their husbands. Thus the spouse of a despot, the despotess (despotissa), had the right to bear the same insignia as he. Among the women of the court, the despotesses likewise took the first place after the empress.

The use of the title spread also to the other countries of the Balkans. The Latin Empire used it to honour the Doge of Venice Enrico Dandolo and the local ruler of the Rhodope region, Alexius Slav. After ca. 1219 it was regularly borne (it is not clear whether the title was awarded by the Emperor or usurped) by the Venetian podestàs in Constantinople, as the Venetian support became crucial to the Empire's survival. In 1279/80, it was introduced in Bulgaria to placate the powerful magnate (and later Tsar) George Terter in 1279/80. During the Serbian Empire it was widely awarded among the various Serbian magnates, with Jovan Oliver being the first holder, and it was held by lesser principalities as well, including the self-proclaimed Albanian despots of Arta. In the 15th century, the Venetian governors of Corfu were also styled as despots. As the title of despot was conferred by the emperor and usually implied a degree of submission by the awardee, the Palaiologan emperors tried long to persuade the Emperors of Trebizond, who also claimed the Byzantine imperial title, to accept the title of despot instead. Only John II of Trebizond and his son Alexios II, however, accepted the title, and even they continued to use the usual imperial title of basileus in their own domains.

With the death of the last Byzantine Emperor Constantine XI on May 29, 1453, the creation of a despot became irregular. The title was granted by Pope Paul II to Andreas Palaiologos, heir to the Byzantine throne in 1465, and by the king of Hungary to the heirs of the Serbian Despotate.

== Despotates ==
From the mid-14th century on, various territories were given to imperial princes with the rank of despot to rule as semi-autonomous appanages, some of which have become widely known in historiography as "despotates" (sing. δεσποτάτον, despotaton, in Greek); in the Byzantine world, these were chiefly the Despotate of Epirus and the Despotate of the Morea. The close association of title and territory began already from the late 13th century and became widespread from the mid-14th century, as a steady succession of despots began to rule over the same territory. Nevertheless, the term "despotate" is technically inaccurate: the title of despot, like every other Byzantine dignity, was not hereditary nor intrinsic to a specific territory. Even in the so-called "despotates", a son of a despot might succeed to his father's territory but could not and would not hold the title unless it was conferred anew by the emperor. In normal Byzantine usage, a clear distinction was drawn between the personal dignity of despot and any other offices or attributes of its holder. Thus for instance John II Orsini was described as "the ruler of Acarnania, the despot John" rather than "the despot of Acarnania" by the emperor-historian John VI Kantakouzenos (r. 1347–1354).

== Insignia ==
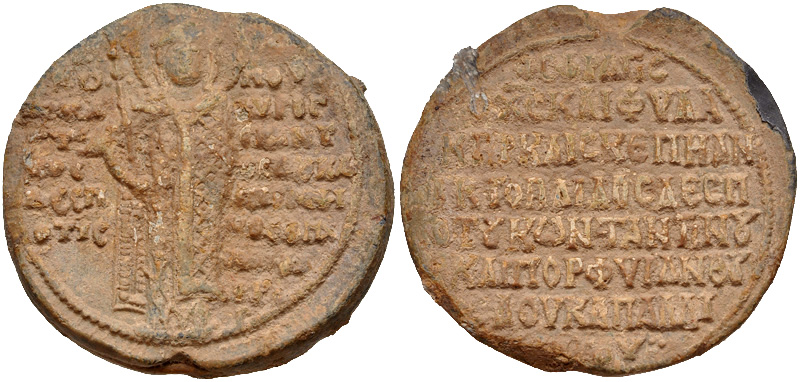
Lead seal of Constantine Palaiologos, showing him in imperial regalia, and mentioning his titles of despot and porphyrogennetos

According to the mid-14th-century Book of Offices of Pseudo-Kodinos and the descriptions given by the historian George Pachymeres, the despot's insignia in the Byzantine court were characterised by the colours purple and white, and a rich decoration in pearls. In detail, the insignia were:

- A brimmed hat called skiadion studded with pearls, with a neck-cover with the owner's name embroidered in gold and pendants "similar to those of the emperor". The skiadion was an everyday headgear, but it was forbidden to despots who had not reached adolescence to wear it indoors. For ceremonies and festivities, the despot bore the domed skaranikon, decorated with gold metalwork, precious stones and pearls.
- A red tunic similar to the emperor's, with gold embroideries of the rizai style but without military insignia, red leggings and a red cloak (tamparion) with broad stripes. For festive occasions, the long kaftan-like kabbadion was worn, of red or purple colour and decorated with pearls.
- A pair of purple and white soft boots, decorated with imperial eagles made of pearls on the sides and the instep. The spurs were also bi-coloured, purple and white. In a few cases where emperors wished to show special favour to a son (Constantine Palaiologos under Michael VIII Palaiologos and Matthew Kantakouzenos under John VI Kantakouzenos), red boots like the emperor's were substituted, elevating its holder to an ad hoc, quasi-imperial rank "above the despots" (ὑπὲρ δεσπότας).
- The despot's saddle and horse furniture were similar to that of the emperor, likewise in purple and white, decorated with pearl eagles. The coating of the saddle and the despot's tent were white with small red eagles.

The despot also had the right to sign his letters with an ink of a dark red colour (the emperor's was bright red).

== Lists of known holders ==
=== Byzantine Empire ===
Note: Names in italics indicate persons who claimed the title but were never conferred it by a reigning Byzantine emperor

Name	Tenure	Conferred by	Notes	Refs
Béla III of Hungary	1163–1169	Manuel I Komnenos	Son-in-law and heir-presumptive until 1169, thereafter demoted to Caesar	
Theodore Vatatzes	unknown	Manuel I Komnenos	Married to Manuel I's sister Eudokia. His holding of the title is attested only in the seal of his son.	
Alexios Palaiologos	1200–1203	Alexios III Angelos	Son-in-law and heir-apparent of Alexios III, second husband of Irene Angelina. Maternal grandfather of Michael VIII	
Theodore I Laskaris	1203–1208	Alexios III Angelos	Son-in-law of Alexios III, he was probably granted the title of despot after the death of Alexios Palaiologos. He founded the Empire of Nicaea and was proclaimed emperor in 1205, although he was not crowned until 1208 and was still formally despot until then.	
Leo Sgouros	1203/1204–1208	Alexios III Angelos	Ruler of much of southern Greece, he met Alexios III after he was evicted from Constantinople by the Fourth Crusade. Sgouros married Eudokia Angelina and was named despot and heir-apparent by the exiled emperor	
Constantine Komnenos Laskaris	c. 1204 – c. 1205	Theodore I Laskaris	Brother of Theodore I.	
John Chamaretos	1208 – unknown	Alexios III Angelos	Lord of Laconia, mentioned as despot in a letter from 1222. He was possibly awarded the title by Alexios III after Leo Sgouros' death	
Andronikos Palaiologos	1216 – unknown	Theodore I Laskaris	Son-in-law and heir-apparent of Theodore I. Very little is known about him with certainty. He married Irene Laskarina and was raised to despot, but died soon after.	
Manuel Komnenos Doukas	1225/1227–1230	Theodore Komnenos Doukas	Brother of Theodore, he was raised to the rank of despot after Theodore crowned himself emperor. As heir to Theodore and ruler of Thessalonica, Manuel held the title of emperor (basileus) after 1230	
Constantine Komnenos Doukas	1225/1227 – unknown	Theodore Komnenos Doukas	Brother of Theodore, he was raised to the rank of despot after Theodore crowned himself emperor.	
John Komnenos Doukas	1242–1244	John III Vatatzes	Ruler of Thessalonica, he abandoned the imperial title and acknowledged the suzerainty of Nicaea in 1242, being rewarded with the title of despot.	
Demetrios Angelos Doukas	1244–1246	John III Vatatzes	Inherited rule of Thessalonica from his brother John and was conferred like him with the title of despot. Deposed by John III in 1246.	
Michael VIII Palaiologos	1258–1259	John IV Laskaris	Leader of the nobles, he was declared regent after the murder of George Mouzalon and raised first to megas doux and then, within weeks, to despot. He was crowned emperor on 1 January 1259.	
John Palaiologos	1259 – c. 1273/1275	Michael VIII Palaiologos	Brother of Michael VIII, he was elevated to the rank of despot following his victory at the Battle of Pelagonia. He renounced the insignia and privileges of a despot, but not the title itself, after his defeat at the Battle of Neopatras in 1273/1275, and died shortly after.	
Demetrios Doukas Komnenos Koutroules	unknown	Michael VIII Palaiologos	Third son of Michael II of Epirus, he married Anna, one of the daughters of Michael VIII, and was named despot.	
Constantine Palaiologos	unknown	Michael VIII Palaiologos	Third son of Michael VIII, he is attested as a Despot in seals.	
John II of Trebizond	1282–1297	Michael VIII Palaiologos	Emperor of Trebizond, he was persuaded to renounce his own claim to be "Emperor of the Romans" and accept the title of despot and the hand of Michael VIII's daughter Eudokia. John visited Constantinople in 1282, when the title was conferred and the marriage with Eudokia took place. He nevertheless retained the imperial title in an altered form.	
Constantine Palaiologos	1292–1320s	Andronikos II Palaiologos	Second son of Andronikos II, he was named despot on his marriage to the daughter of Theodore Mouzalon	
John Palaiologos	1294 – unknown	Andronikos II Palaiologos	Third son of Andronikos II, he was named despot on 22 May 1294	
Alexios II of Trebizond	c. 1297–1330	Andronikos II Palaiologos	Son and successor of John II of Trebizond	
Demetrios Palaiologos	1306 – after 1343	Andronikos II Palaiologos	Fifth son of Andronikos II, named despot in 1306	
Theodore Palaiologos	unknown	Andronikos II Palaiologos	Fourth son of Andronikos II, named despot at an unknown date, from 1305 Marquess of Montferrat	
Manuel Palaiologos	unknown – 1320	Andronikos II Palaiologos	Second son of Michael IX Palaiologos, named despot at an unknown date, killed by mistake by his brother Andronikos III Palaiologos	
Michael Palaiologos	before 1341 – unknown	Andronikos III Palaiologos	Second son of Andronikos III, named despot at a very young age	
Momchil	1343/44–1345	Anna of Savoy	Bulgarian ruler of the Rhodopes, awarded the title by the Empress-regent during the Byzantine civil war of 1341–1347, in order to detach him from John VI Kantakouzenos, who titled him sebastokrator. Effectively independent until defeated and killed by Kantakouzenos' army.	
Manuel Komnenos Raoul Asanes	before 1358 – unknown	John VI Kantakouzenos	Brother-in-law of John VI Kantakouzenos, named first sebastokrator by him and despot at an unknown date	
John Kantakouzenos	1357 – unknown	John V Palaiologos	Eldest son of Matthew Kantakouzenos, named despot on his father's abdication of his imperial title	
Michael Palaiologos	unknown	John V Palaiologos	Third son of John V, ruler of Mesembria, murdered in 1376/7	
Andronikos Palaiologos	1409 – c. 1424	Manuel II Palaiologos	Third son of Manuel II, Despot in Thessalonica from 1409 until 1423 (styled "Despot of Thessaly" by Doukas), shortly thereafter he entered a monastery	
John Palaiologos	unknown	Manuel II Palaiologos	Son of Andronikos, Despot of Thessalonica. He is mentioned as holding the title in 1419.	

==== Despots of the Morea ====
Name	Tenure	Conferred by	Notes	Refs
Manuel Kantakouzenos	1347–1380	John VI Kantakouzenos	Second son of John VI, named despot after the Byzantine civil war of 1341–1347, first "Despot of the Morea" from 1349 until his death	
Theodore I Palaiologos	before 1376–1407	John V Palaiologos	Third son of John V, from 1383 until his death "Despot of Lacedaemon"	
Theodore II Palaiologos	1406/1407–1448	Manuel II Palaiologos	Second son of Manuel II, Despot in the Morea from 1407, and in Selymbria from 1443 to his death	
Constantine XI Palaiologos	unknown – 1449	Manuel II Palaiologos	Fourth son of Manuel II and last Byzantine emperor. Despot in Selymbria until 1443, thereafter co-despot in the Morea until 1449, when he succeeded to the Byzantine throne	
Demetrios Palaiologos	1425–1460	Manuel II Palaiologos	Fifth son of Manuel II, despot in Lemnos from 1425 to 1449, in Mesembria from 1440, co-despot in the Morea from 1449 until the Ottoman conquest in 1460	
Thomas Palaiologos	1428–1460	John VIII Palaiologos	Sixth son of Manuel II, co-despot in the Morea from 1428 until the Ottoman conquest in 1460. According to Sphrantzes, however, he was not titled despot until 1449, when his brother Constantine became emperor.	
Manuel Kantakouzenos	1453		Grandson of Demetrios I Kantakouzenos, he was acclaimed as leader and despot of the Morea by the local Albanian and Greek inhabitants during the failed Morea revolt of 1453–1454. He was soon eclipsed by Giovanni Asen Zaccaria.	
Titular claimants in exile
Andreas Palaiologos	1465 – 1502	Pope Pius II (?)	Eldest son of Thomas Palaiologos and heir of the Palaiologan line. According to Sphrantzes, he was awarded the title of Despot of the Morea by the Pope, but R. Guilland suggested that he may have already received the title before 1460. In his seal he bore the title "By the grace of God, Despot of the Romans" (Latin: Dei gratia despotes Romeorum).Claimant to the Byzantine throne from 1465 to 1494.	
Fernando Palaiologos	1502 – unknown	Self-proclaimed	Possibly an illegitimate son of Andreas Palaiologos, he adopted the title upon the death of Andreas in 1502. His subsequent fate is unknown.	
Constantine Arianiti	1502/07 – 1530	Self-proclaimed	An Albanian nobleman, he claimed the fictional titles 'Prince of Macedonia' and 'Duke of Achaea' since the 1490s. He adopted the title of Despot of the Morea after the death of Andreas, sometime between 1502 and 1507. He was appointed governor of Fano by the Pope, and died there in 1530.	
Later pretenders
Gian Antonio Lazier	1720 – 1738	Self-proclaimed, recognized by Charles VI	Italian impostor and pretender to the Byzantine throne who was recognized by the Holy Roman Emperor, Charles VI. He claimed, among other titles, the title of 'Despot of the Peloponnese'.	
Radu Cantacuzino	1735 – unknown	Self-proclaimed, possibly recognized by Charles VI	Romanian prince and pretender to the Byzantine throne who was possibly recognized by the Holy Roman Emperor, Charles VI. He claimed, among other titles, the title of 'Despot of the Peloponnese'.	

==== Despots of Epirus ====
Name	Tenure	Conferred by	Notes	Refs
Michael II Komnenos Doukas	before 1246–1267/1268	John III Vatatzes	Nephew of Manuel Komnenos Doukas, ruler of Epirus	
Nikephoros I Komnenos Doukas	before 1248/1250–1297	John III Vatatzes	Son and heir of Michael II of Epirus, he was awarded the title on his betrothal to Maria, the granddaughter of John III. He ruled Epirus from his father's death in 1267/1268.	
Thomas I Komnenos Doukas	1297–1318	Andronikos II Palaiologos	Only son and heir of Nikephoros I of Epirus	
Nicholas Orsini	1319/20–1323	Andronikos II Palaiologos	Count palatine of Cephalonia and Zakynthos, he assassinated and usurped his uncle, Thomas I of Epirus, in 1318. He was named despot in 1319/20 in exchange for recognizing the annexation of Ioannina by the Byzantine Empire.	
Nikephoros II Orsini	1347–1359	John VI Kantakouzenos	Son-in-law of John VI, named despot after the Byzantine civil war of 1341–1347, ruler of Epirus in 1335–1338 and 1356–1359	
Thomas II Preljubović	1382–1384	John V Palaiologos	Son of Gregory Preljub, he was given the rule of Ioannina and its region by his father-in-law Simeon Uroš in 1367. The title of despot was not formally conferred by the Byzantine Emperor until 1382 however.	
Esau de' Buondelmonti	ca. 1385 – 1411	John V Palaiologos (?)	An Italian, he was possibly involved in the murder of Thomas Preljubović, and succeeded him as ruler of Ioannina when he married his widow Maria.	
Carlo I Tocco	1415–1429	Manuel II Palaiologos	Count palatine of Cephalonia and Zakynthos, he succeeded in obtaining Ioannina in 1411 shortly after the death of his uncle Esau de' Buondelmonti. To formalize his position, in 1415 he sent his brother Leonardo to Emperor Manuel to obtain confirmation as Despot. In 1416, Carlo re-united the old Despotate of Epirus by capturing Arta as well.	
Titular claimants in exile
Carlo II Tocco	1429–1448		Successor of Carlo I Tocco as Count palatine of Cephalonia and Zakynthos and ruler of Epirus. He claimed the traditional title of despot, but was never officially conferred it by a Byzantine emperor	
Leonardo III Tocco	1448–1503		Successor of Carlo II Tocco as Count palatine of Cephalonia and Zakynthos and titular despot of Epirus. He ruled in the islands until the Ottoman conquest of 1479, and thereafter maintained his claims in exile in Italy.	
Carlo III Tocco	1503–1518		Son of Leonardo III Tocco and Milica Branković, granddaughter of Thomas Palaiologos. Claimed the inheritance of "the despots of Romania and Arta"	

=== Empire of Trebizond ===
Name	Tenure	Conferred by	Notes	Refs
Alexios Megas Komnenos	1395–1417	Manuel III of Trebizond		
John Megas Komnenos	1417–1426	Alexios IV of Trebizond	Exiled after murdering his mother	
Alexander Megas Komnenos	c. 1426–1429	Alexios IV of Trebizond	Replaced his elder brother as despotes	
David Megas Komnenos	c. 1429–1460	John IV of Trebizond		

=== Latin Empire ===
Name	Tenure	Conferred by	Notes	Refs
Enrico Dandolo	1204–1205	Baldwin I of Constantinople	Doge of Venice and the driving force behind the Fourth Crusade's capture of Constantinople, as well as behind Baldwin's election as Latin Emperor instead of Boniface of Montferrat. Named Despot as the main vassal of the Latin Empire. Şerban Marin, however, suggests that the reference to Dandolo as Despot in Greek sources was not as the court dignity, but as a Greek translation of the title dominus, indicating his lordship over three-eighths of the former Byzantine Empire.	
Alexius Slav	1208/9 – after 1222	Henry of Flanders	Autonomous Bulgarian ruler of the Rhodopes, named Despot when he married an illegitimate daughter of Emperor Henry and became a Latin vassal.	
Jacopo Tiepolo	1219–1221	Yolanda of Flanders (?)	Venetian Podestà of Constantinople, he may have been given the title of "Despot of the Empire of Romania" (despotes imperii Romaniae) by Empress Yolanda to secure Venetian support, or he may have appropriated it himself.	
Marino Storlato	1222–1223	Robert of Courtenay	Venetian Podestà of Constantinople	
Albertino Morosini	c. 1238	Baldwin II of Constantinople	Venetian Podestà of Constantinople	
Philip I, Prince of Taranto	1294/97–1315, 1330–1332	Charles II of Naples	Husband of Thamar, the daughter of Nikephoros I of Epirus. On Nikephoros' death, he was given the title "Despot of Romania" on behalf of his wife and as the ruler of all Angevin or subject territories in Albania (the "Kingdom of Albania") and Greece north of the Gulf of Corinth (Thamar's dowry in Aetolia, and the rest of the Epirote state in its capacity as an Angevin vassal).	
Philip	1315–1330	Philip I, Prince of Taranto	Eldest surviving son of Philip of Taranto, granted the title and claims of the "Despotate of Romania" in 1315 until his death.	
Martino Zaccaria	1325–1345	Philip I, Prince of Taranto	Lord of Chios, Samos and Kos. He was awarded the title of "King and Despot of Asia Minor" by Philip in hopes of enlisting him in an effort to reclaim Constantinople.	
Robert, Prince of Taranto	1332–1346	Catherine of Valois	Eldest surviving son of Philip of Taranto and the titular Latin Empress Catherine. Prince of Taranto and Achaea, after 1346 himself titular Latin Emperor.	

=== Bulgarian Empire ===
Name	Tenure	Conferred by	Notes	Refs
Jacob Svetoslav	before 1261–1275/1277	possibly Tsar Constantine Tikh	Powerful magnate and autonomous lord of Sofia, he was probably named despot by a Bulgarian ruler rather than a Nicaean emperor	
George I Terter	1278/1279–1292	Tsar Ivan Asen III	Powerful magnate, he was given the title of despot along with the hand of the sister of Tsar Ivan Asen III to win him over in the face of the uprising of Ivaylo. George later deposed Ivan Asen and became Tsar himself.	
Shishman of Vidin	1270s/1280s — before 1308/1313	Tsar George I Terter	Founder of the Shishman dynasty and first semi-autonomous despot of Vidin	
Aldimir	1280s–1305	probably by Tsar George I Terter	Younger brother of George I, he was raised to the rank of despot by him, and received (possibly after 1298) the region of Kran as an appanage ("Despotate of Kran")	
Michael Shishman of Bulgaria	before 1313–1322/1323	Tsar Theodore Svetoslav	Autonomous lord of Vidin, named despot at or soon after his father Shishman of Vidin's death. Became Tsar of Bulgaria in 1322/1333.	
Belaur	1323 – c. 1331	Tsar Michael Shishman	Half-brother of Michael Shishman, he succeeded him as autonomous lord of Vidin with the rank of despot. He resisted the rule of Ivan Alexander and was forced to flee into exile	
Sratsimir	unknown	unknown	Sratsimir was a magnate holding the territory of Kran with the title of Despot. He was the eponymous founder of the Sratsimir dynasty.	
Ivan Alexander	By 1330 – 1371	Tsar Michael Shishman	By 1330, the importance of the city resulted in the Asen family appointing John to govern Lovech, forming the despotate of Lovech.	
Mihail Shishman of Vidin	unknown	Tsar Ivan Alexander	Younger son of Tsar Michael Shishman, he probably succeeded Belaur as autonomous lord of Vidin with the rank of despot.	
Dobrotitsa	after 1347 – 1386	Tsar Ivan Alexander	Ruler of the Despotate of Dobruja	

=== Serbian Empire and successor states ===
Name	Tenure	Conferred by	Notes	Refs
Jovan Oliver	1334–1356	Andronikos III Palaiologos	Autonomous Serbian magnate, named despot by Andronikos III after the Byzantine-Serbian peace agreement of 1334	
Simeon Uroš	1345/1346–1363	Stephen Uroš IV Dušan	Half-brother of Stephen Dušan, he was named despot probably after Dušan's coronation as emperor. Governor of Epirus, he proclaimed himself Tsar in 1356 and tried to seize control of Serbia but failed. Ruler of Thessaly and most of Epirus from 1359 until his death c. 1370	
John Komnenos Asen	1345/1346–1363	Stephen Uroš IV Dušan	Brother-in-law of Stephen Dušan, he was named despot probably after Dušan's coronation as emperor. Ruler of the Principality of Valona until his death	
Ivaniš	fl. 1348	Stephen Uroš IV Dušan	Close relative of Stephen Dušan. Ruler of a region in Toplica.	
Dejan	After August 1355	Stephen Uroš IV Dušan or Stephen Uroš V	Brother-in-law of Stephen Dušan. Ruler of a region in the Kumanovo region.	
Gjin Bua Shpata	c. 1360/1365 – c. 1399/1400	Simeon Uroš Palaiologos	Albanian clan leader, in the early 1360s he was recognized as Despot and ruler of Aetolia (the "Despotate of Angelokastron") by the titular Serbian Emperor and ruler of Thessaly Simeon Uroš. He was de facto independent, and in 1374 annexed the Despotate of Arta and launched repeated unsuccessful attacks against Ioannina.	
Peter Losha	c. 1360/1365–1374	Simeon Uroš Palaiologos	Albanian clan leader, in the early 1360s he was recognized as Despot and ruler of Acarnania (the "Despotate of Arta") by the titular Serbian Emperor and ruler of Thessaly Simeon Uroš. He was de facto independent however, and attacked Thomas Preljubović at Ioannina, before coming to terms with him. He died of the plague in 1373/1374.	
Vukašin Mrnjavčević	1364–1365	Stephen Uroš V	One of the most powerful Serbian magnates under Stephen Dušan, he was named despot in 1364 and then king and co-ruler by the emperor Stephen Uroš V. He became de facto independent by 1368, and was killed by the Ottomans in the Battle of Maritsa in 1371.	
Jovan Uglješa	1365–1371	Stephen Uroš V	Brother of Vukašin Mrnjavčević, he was named despot in succession to his brother and became ruler of Serres alongside Dušan's widow Helena. From c. 1368 he was a de facto independent ruler until his death in the Battle of Maritsa.	
Jovan Dragaš	1365 – c. 1378	Stephen Uroš V	Cousin of Stephen Uroš V and nephew of Stephen IV Dušan, with his brother Constantine Dragaš he governed eastern domain from Kumanovo to Velbužd). From the Battle of Maritsa on he was an Ottoman vassal.	
Serbian Despotate
Stefan Lazarević	1402–1427	Manuel II Palaiologos	Ruler of Serbia as an Ottoman vassal. He was awarded the title of despot during a visit to Constantinople in 1402, and ruled the "Serbian Despotate" as an autonomous lord until his death in 1427.	
Đurađ Branković	1429–1456	Manuel II Palaiologos	Successor of Stefan Lazarević as ruler of Serbia from 1427, he received the title of despot in 1429. An Ottoman vassal from 1428.	
Lazar Branković	1440s–1458	Manuel II Palaiologos	Son and successor of Đurađ Branković, he received the title of despot during his father's reign.	
Stefan Branković	1458–1459	unknown	Son of Đurađ Branković, ruler of Serbia. Deposed in favour of Stephen Tomašević.	
Stephen Tomašević	April–June 1459	unknown	Prince of Bosnia, he became the last independent Serbian ruler after his marriage to Helena-Maria, the daughter of Lazar Branković. He assumed the title of despot (or perhaps was awarded it by Lazar's widow, the Byzantine princess Helena Palaiologina). His capital Smederevo was conquered by the Ottomans a few months later.	
Titular despots in exile under Hungarian suzerainty
Vuk Grgurević	1471–1485	Matthias Corvinus	Grandson of Đurađ Branković	
Đorđe Branković	1486–1496	Matthias Corvinus	Son of Stefan Branković	
Jovan Branković	1486–1502	Vladislaus II	Son of Stefan Branković	
Ivaniš Berislavić	1504–1514	Vladislaus II	Married Jovan Branković's widow, Jelena Jakšić	
Stefan Berislavić	1514–1521	Vladislaus II	Son of Ivaniš Berislavić	
Radič Božić	1527–1528	John Zápolya		
Pavle Bakić	1537	Ferdinand I		

== See also ==
- Despotovac

== Notes and references ==
Notes

== Sources ==
- Biljarski, I.A. (1998). Instituciite na srednovekovna Bălgarija. Vtoro bălgarsko carstvo (XII–XIV v.) [Institutions of medieval Bulgaria. Second Bulgarian Empire (12th–14th c.)] (in Bulgarian). Sofia.
- Ćirković, Sima (1999). "Поствизантијски деспоти" [Post-Byzantine Despots]. Zbornik radova Vizantoloskog instituta (in Serbian). 38. Belgrade: 395–406.
- Failler, Albert (1982). "Les insignes et la signature du despote" [The Insignia and Signature of the Despot]. Revue des études byzantines (in French). 40: 171–186. doi:10.3406/rebyz.1982.2136.
- Ferjančić, Bozidar (1960). Деспоти у Византији и Јужнословенским земљама [Despots in Byzantium and the South Slavic Lands] (in Serbian). Belgrade: Српска академија наука.
- Fine, John V. A. (1994) [1987]. The Late Medieval Balkans: A Critical Survey from the Late Twelfth Century to the Ottoman Conquest. Ann Arbor, Michigan: University of Michigan Press. ISBN 978-0-472-10079-8.
- Grierson, Philip; Bellinger, Alfred Raymond; Hendy, Michael F. (1973). Catalogue of the Byzantine coins in the Dumbarton Oaks Collection and in the Whittemore Collection. Dumbarton Oaks. ISBN 978-0-88402-045-5.
- Guilland, Rodolphe (1959). "Recherches sur l'histoire administrative de l'Empire byzantin: Le despote, δεσπότης" [Studies on the Administrative History of the Byzantine Empire: The Despot, δεσπότης]. Revue des études byzantines (in French). 17: 52–89. doi:10.3406/rebyz.1959.1199.
- Harris, Jonathan (2013). "Despots, Emperors, and Balkan Identity in Exile". The Sixteenth Century Journal. 44 (3): 643–661. doi:10.1086/SCJ24244808. JSTOR 24244808.
- Iorga, N. (1933), "Radu Cantacuzino. Ședința dela 10 Iunie 1932" [Radu Cantacuzino. Meeting of June 10, 1932] (PDF), Memoriile Secțiunii Istorice a Academiei Române, Seria III (in Romanian), Tom XIII: 149–158
- Kazhdan, Alexander (1991). "Despotes". In Kazhdan, Alexander (ed.). The Oxford Dictionary of Byzantium. Oxford and New York: Oxford University Press. p. 614. ISBN 0-19-504652-8.
- Longnon, Jean (1949). L'empire latin de Constantinople et la principauté de Morée [The Latin Empire of Constantinople and the Principality of the Morea] (in French). Paris: Payot.
- Macrides, Ruth (2007). George Akropolites: The History – Introduction, Translation and Commentary. Oxford: Oxford University Press. ISBN 978-0-19-921067-1.
- Marin, Şerban (2004). "Dominus quartae partis et dimidiae totius imperii Romaniae: The Fourth Crusade and the Dogal Title in the Venetian Chronicles' Representation". Quaderni della Casa Romena di Venezia. 3: 119–150.
- Miller, William (1921). Essays on the Latin Orient. Cambridge: Cambridge University Press.
- Nicol, Donald M. (1993) [1972]. The Last Centuries of Byzantium, 1261–1453 (Second ed.). Cambridge: Cambridge University Press. ISBN 978-0-521-43991-6.
- Nicol, Donald MacGillivray (1984). The Despotate of Epiros 1267–1479: A Contribution to the History of Greece in the Middle Ages. Cambridge: Cambridge University Press. ISBN 978-0-521-13089-9.
- Setton, Kenneth M. (1976). The Papacy and the Levant (1204–1571), Volume I: The Thirteenth and Fourteenth Centuries. Vol. 1. Philadelphia: The American Philosophical Society. ISBN 0-87169-114-0.
- Setton, Kenneth M. (1978). The Papacy and the Levant (1204–1571), Volume II: The Fifteenth Century. Vol. 2. Philadelphia: The American Philosophical Society. ISBN 0-87169-127-2.
- Shawcross, Theresa (2012). "Conquest Legitimized: The Making of a Byzantine Emperor in Crusader Constantinople (1204–1261)". In Harris, Jonathan; Holmes, Catherine; Russell, Eugenia (eds.). Byzantines, Latins, and Turks in the Eastern Mediterranean World After 1150. Oxford: Oxford University Press. pp. 181–220. ISBN 978-0-19-964188-8.
- Soulis, George Christos (1984). The Serbs and Byzantium during the reign of Tsar Stephen Dušan (1331–1355) and his successors. Dumbarton Oaks. ISBN 0-88402-137-8.
- Topping, Peter (1975). "The Morea, 1311–1364". In Setton, Kenneth M.; Hazard, Harry W. (eds.). A History of the Crusades, Volume III: The Fourteenth and Fifteenth Centuries. Vol. 3. Madison and London: University of Wisconsin Press. pp. 104–140. ISBN 0-299-06670-3.
- Trapp, Erich; Beyer, Hans-Veit; Walther, Rainer; Sturm-Schnabl, Katja; Kislinger, Ewald; Leontiadis, Ioannis; Kaplaneres, Sokrates (1976–1996). Prosopographisches Lexikon der Palaiologenzeit (in German). Vienna: Verlag der Österreichischen Akademie der Wissenschaften. ISBN 3-7001-3003-1.
- Van Tricht, Filip (2011). The Latin Renovatio of Byzantium: The Empire of Constantinople (1204–1228). Leiden: Brill. ISBN 978-90-04-20323-5.
- Verpeaux, Jean, ed. (1966). Pseudo-Kodinos, Traité des Offices (in French). Centre National de la Recherche Scientifique.
- Zakythinos, D. A. (1932). Le despotat grec de Morée, Tome 1: Histoire politique [The Greek Despotate of the Morea, Volume 1: Political History] (in French). Paris: Société d'édition "Les Belles Lettres". OCLC 1001644255.
- Zečević, Nada (2014) [1968]. The Tocco of the Greek Realm: Nobility, Power and Migration in Latin Greece (14th – 15th Centuries). Makart. ISBN 978-86-87115-11-8.
