= Andronikos Angelos Palaiologos =

Byzantine aristocrat and military governor

- protosebastos
- Born: ca. 1282
- Died: 1328
- Noble family: House of Angelos
- Spouse: Kokala
- Issue: Anna Palaiologina wife of John Angelos
- Father: Demetrios Doukas Komnenos Koutroules
- Mother: Anna Palaiologina

Andronikos Angelos Komnenos Doukas Palaiologos (Greek: Ἀνδρόνικος Ἄγγελος Κομνηνός Δούκας Παλαιολόγος, ca. 1282–1328), was a Byzantine aristocrat and military leader.

He was born ca. 1282 to Demetrios Doukas Komnenos Koutroules, son of the ruler of Epirus, Michael II Komnenos Doukas, and Anna Komnene Palaiologina, the daughter of the Byzantine emperor Michael VIII Palaiologos. By 1326, he held the post of protovestiarios and the rank of protosebastos. In 1327–28, Andronikos was military governor of Velegrada (modern Berat). During the Byzantine civil war of 1321–28, he initially sided with Andronikos III Palaiologos against his grandfather Andronikos II Palaiologos, but then switched sides. As a result, when Andronikos III Palaiologos ousted his grandfather in 1328, he arrested his family and confiscated his property and his extensive estates in Macedonia. Andronikos was thereby forced to defect to Serbia, dying in exile at Prilep in 1328.

He was married to a daughter, name unknown, of a certain Kokalas. The couple had at least two daughters, the future queen-consort of Epirus Anna Palaiologina and another daughter, name unknown, who married John Angelos.

== Sources ==
- Trapp, Erich; Beyer, Hans-Veit; Walther, Rainer; Sturm-Schnabl, Katja; Kislinger, Ewald; Leontiadis, Ioannis; Kaplaneres, Sokrates (1976–1996). Prosopographisches Lexikon der Palaiologenzeit (in German). Vienna: Verlag der Österreichischen Akademie der Wissenschaften. ISBN 3-7001-3003-1.
