= Shishman of Vidin =

Bulgarian nobleman

Shishman

Despot of Vidin
- Reign: 1270s/1280s — before 1308/1313
- Successor: Michael Shishman
- Born: 13th century
- Died: before 1308 or 1313
- Noble family: Shishman dynasty
- Spouses: daughter of Anna–Theodora daughter of Serbian Grand Prince Dragoš
- Issue: Michael Shishman; Belaur; Keratsa Petritsa

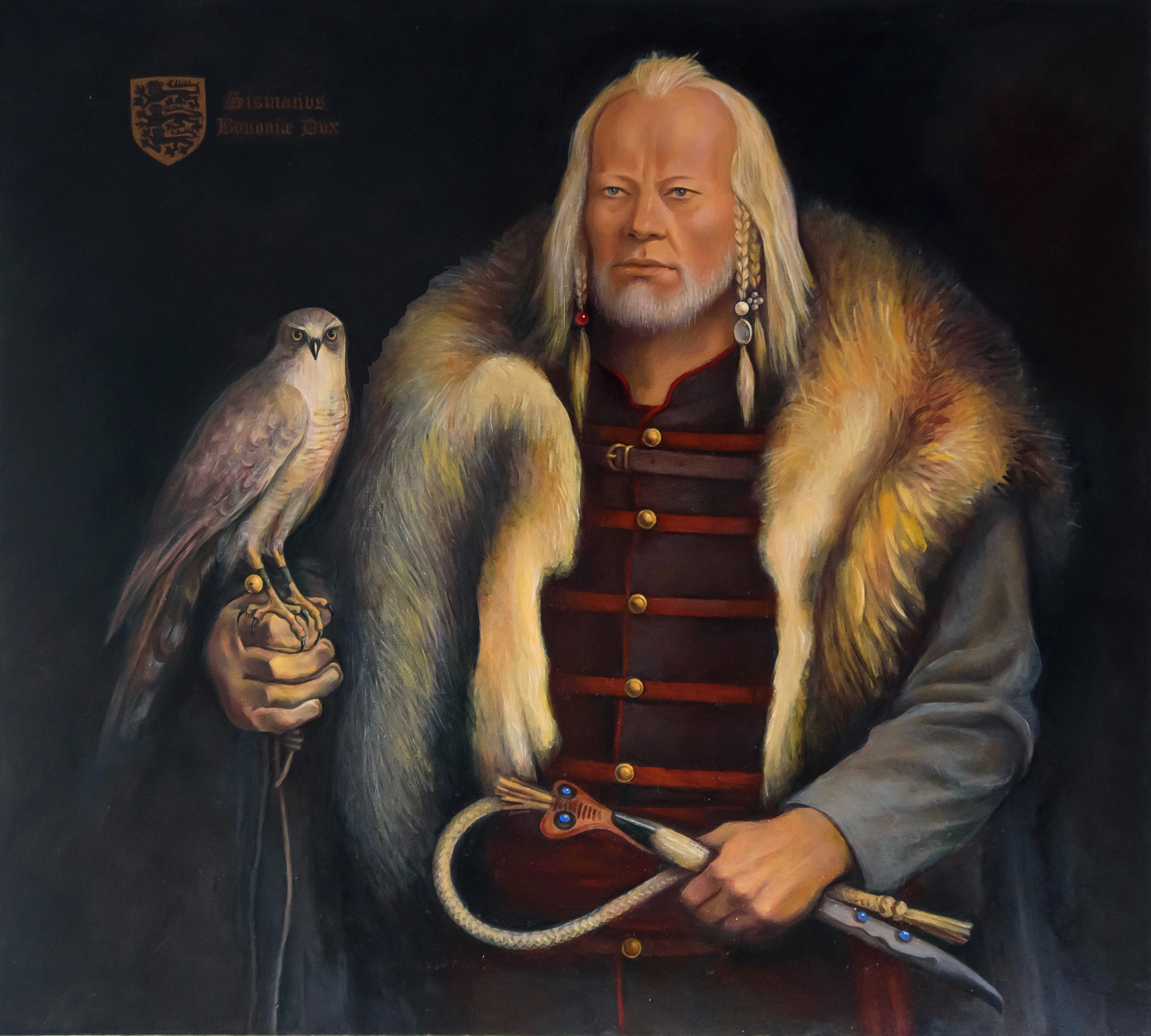
Shishman of Vidin, painting by anonymous author, late 19th century.

Shishman (Bulgarian: Шишман; fl. 1270s/1280s — before 1308/1313) was a Bulgarian nobleman (boyar) who ruled a semi-independent realm based out of the Danubian fortress of Vidin in the late 13th and early 14th century. Shishman, who was bestowed the title of "despot" by Bulgarian emperor George Terter I, was a Cuman, and may have been established as lord of Vidin as early as the 1270s.

In 1291, he came under Golden Horde ("Tatar") suzerainty and in 1292 he was in charge of an unsuccessful campaign against neighbouring Serbia. Even though the Serbs captured Vidin in their counter-offensive, perhaps thanks to Tatar influence Shishman was placed once more as the ruler of the region, this time as a Serbian vassal. However, he continued to rule his lands largely independently. As his son and successor as despot of Vidin Michael Shishman acceded to the Bulgarian throne in 1323, Shishman was the progenitor of the last medieval Bulgarian royal dynasty, the Shishman dynasty.

== Bulgarian despot and Tatar suzerainty ==
Shishman's early life and rise through the ranks of the Bulgarian nobility are poorly documented. He was a Cuman, considered to have been a descendant of the wave of Cumans that settled in Bulgaria after 1241, when ethnic conflicts with the Hungarians caused them to leave the Kingdom of Hungary. It has been accepted in Bulgarian historiography that Shishman's first wife was an unnamed daughter of Anna-Teodora and sebastokrator Peter and thus a maternal granddaughter of Emperor Ivan Asen II (r. 1218–1241) of the Asen dynasty. In contemporary sources, Shishman is variously described as a prince (knyaz), king or even emperor (tsar) of Bulgaria, though his only official title was that of "despot".

According to historian John V. A. Fine, Shishman may have established his authority over the Vidin region as early as the 1270s, after the death of the previous lord of that area, Jacob Svetoslav. He was perhaps elevated to the position of despot of Vidin soon after the accession of another Bulgarian noble of Cuman origin, George Terter I (r. 1280–1292), to the Bulgarian throne in 1280. Shishman was likely a close relative, perhaps even a brother, of George Terter I.

Shishman's domain comprised "much of the Bulgarian land" as well as "adjacent countries", as reported by the account of Serbian archbishop Danilo. Indeed, his lands constituted the largest autonomous province of Bulgaria at the time. Bulgarian historian Yordan Andreev estimates the lands ruled by Shishman to have extended from the Iron Gates gorge of the Danube in the west to the towns of Lom and Vratsa in the east. Shishman also controlled territories north of the Danube, in western Wallachia (Oltenia), as chroniclers describe the Danube River as running through the middle of his lands.

In 1285, increasing Tatar pressure from the northeast had forced the Second Bulgarian Empire to come under the political dependence of Nogai Khan, the ruler of the Golden Horde. At the time Shishman's realm centred at Vidin was largely independent from the Bulgarian tsars in Tarnovo, though he retained a degree of loyalty to Bulgaria and maintained friendly relations with Serbia. However, in 1291 Shishman too was forced to acknowledge the suzerainty of Nogai in order to counter the increasing Serbian pressure from the west. In the same year, the joint forces of brothers, one Hungarian vassal Stefan Dragutin, and Serbian king Stefan Milutin (r. 1280–1321), had managed to oust two Cuman–Bulgarian nobles and allies of Shishman, Darman and Kudelin, who were in control of the Braničevo region. As result, Shishman failed to repel the brothers forces, and accepted Serbian suzerainty.

== Anti-Serbian campaign and Serbian vassalage ==
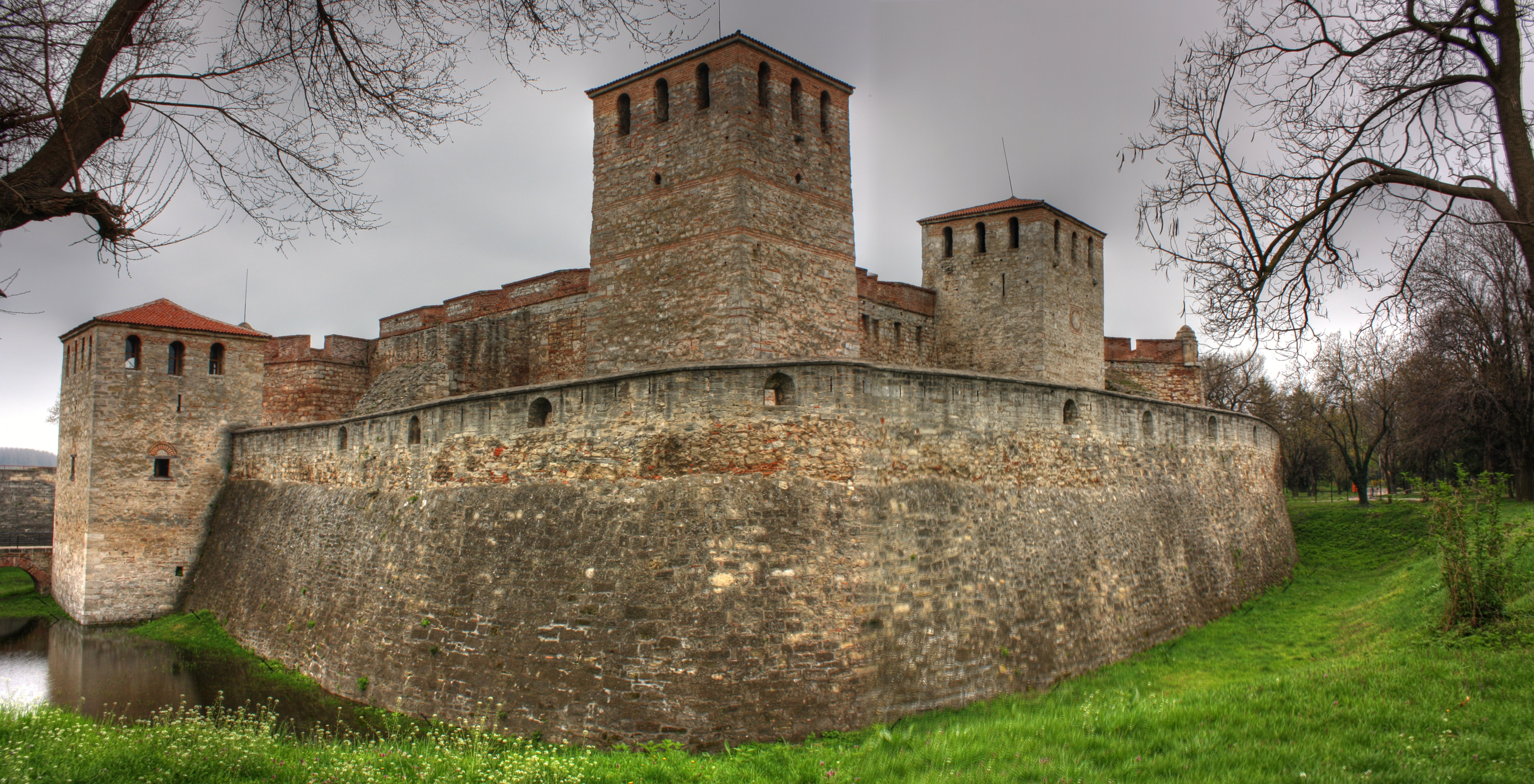
The medieval Baba Vida castle in Vidin, the capital of Shishman's semi-independent realm

Encouraged by Nogai, in 1292 Shishman launched a major campaign against Serbian king Stefan Milutin, his neighbour to the west. Thanks to the support of Tatar mercenaries, Shishman's forces raided deep into Serbian territory and reached Hvosno (in Kosovo). After attempting to conquer the fortress of Ždrelo to no avail and burning the Žiča monastery, Shishman's troops returned to Vidin without any territorial gains. Milutin's response to Shishman's act of aggression was much more successful. His counter-attack resulted in Serbian forces reaching Vidin and capturing Shishman's capital after a brief siege. The despot, however, managed to escape north of the Danube to the safety of his Tatar suzerains.

Instead of annexing Shishman's lands, Milutin reinstalled Shishman as the despot of Vidin and concluded an alliance with him. To confirm the alliance, Shishman married the daughter of Serbian veliki župan Dragoš. The future marriage of Shishman's son and future Bulgarian emperor Michael Shishman (r. 1323–1330) to Milutin's daughter Ana-Neda was also arranged at the time with the intention of further sealing the union. It is quite apparent that Shishman's unlikely reinstallment in Vidin and alliance with Serbia were dictated by Nogai, as at the same time Serbia also came under Tatar dependence. Milutin was even forced to send his son Stefan Dečanski into captivity in order to prevent a Tatar attack.

Although Shishman's realm was nominally a Serbian client state for an unknown time, he retained his prior semi-independence and he was completely in charge of his lands. He maintained good relations with Bulgaria and, according to Andreev, his political activity was mainly concentrated in dealing with Bulgaria. He also retained his close ties with Nogai and his descendants. In 1301–1302, Shishman provided political refuge to several of Nogai's relatives, including his grandson Qara-Kesek, who fled to Vidin along with a 3,000-strong cavalry and remained there until after 1325. These Tatar nobles were fleeing from the persecution of the new khan, Toqta, who had defeated and murdered Nogai in 1299–1300. Contrary to Andreev's opinion, Fine believes that the death of Nogai increased Serbia's influence over Vidin.

Shishman died in the early 14th century but before 1308 or 1313. He was succeeded as ruler of Vidin by his son Michael, who in 1323 was elected to the Bulgarian throne due to the childless death of Emperor George Terter II (r. 1321–1322). Besides Michael, Shishman's other progeny included Belaur, another despot of Vidin, and Keratsa Petritsa, the mother of Bulgarian emperor Ivan Alexander (r. 1331–1371). Bulgarian historian Ivan Bozhilov classifies all of Shishman's known children as descendants of the Asen dynasty, thus indicating that they were born to his first wife, the daughter of Anna–Theodora. The descendants of Shishman of Vidin, known collectively as the Shishman dynasty, ruled the Second Bulgarian Empire from 1323 until it was ultimately subjugated by the Ottomans at the turn of the 15th century.

== Sources ==
- Fine, John Van Antwerp (1994). The Late Medieval Balkans: A Critical Survey from the Late Twelfth Century to the Ottoman Conquest. University of Michigan Press. ISBN 978-0-472-08260-5.
- Vásáry, István (2005). Cumans and Tatars: Oriental Military in the Pre-Ottoman Balkans, 1185–1365. Cambridge University Press. ISBN 978-0-521-83756-9.
- Андреев, Йордан; Лазаров, Иван; Павлов, Пламен (1999). Кой кой е в средновековна България [Who is Who in Medieval Bulgaria] (in Bulgarian). Петър Берон. ISBN 978-954-402-047-7.
- Бакалов, Георги; Куманов, Милен (2003). "ШИШМАН (II половина на XIII в.-началото на XIV в.)" [SHISHMAN (2nd half of the 12th c. — early 14th c.)]. Електронно издание "История на България" [Electronic Edition “History of Bulgaria”] (CD) (in Bulgarian). София: Труд, Сирма. ISBN 954528613X.
- Божилов, Иван (1994). Фамилията на Асеневци (1186–1460). Генеалогия и просопография [The Family of the Asens (1186–1460). Genealogy and Prosopography] (in Bulgarian). София: Издателство на Българската академия на науките. ISBN 954-430-264-6.
- Павлов, Пламен (2005). "Метежници и претенденти за търновската царска корона през XIV век" [Rebels and Claimants to the Imperial Crown of Tarnovo in the 14th Century]. Бунтари и авантюристи в средновековна България [Rebels and Venturers in Medieval Bulgaria] (in Bulgarian). Варна: LiterNet. ISBN 954-304-152-0.
