= Ivan Alexander of Bulgaria =

Tsar of Bulgaria from 1331 to 1371

Ivan Alexander Asen
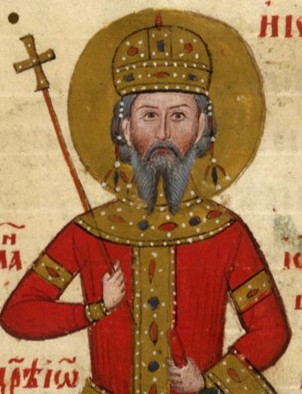
- Portrait, miniature from the Gospels of Tsar Ivan Alexander (1355–1356)

Emperor of Bulgaria
- Reign: 1331 – 17 February 1371
- Predecessor: Ivan Stephen
- Successor: Ivan Shishman; Ivan Sratsimir
- Died: 17 February 1371
- Spouse: Theodora of Wallachia; Sarah (Theodora)
- Issue: Ivan Sratsimir of Bulgaria; Michael Asen IV of Bulgaria; Ivan Asen IV; Kera Tamara; Ivan Shishman of Bulgaria; Desislava of Bulgaria; Ivan Asen V Keratsa of Bulgaria
- Dynasty: Sratsimir
- Father: Sratsimir
- Mother: Keratsa Petritsa
- Religion: Eastern Orthodox

Ivan Alexander Asen (Bulgarian: Иван Александър Асен, transliterated Ivan Aleksandăr Asen, pronounced [iˈvan ɐlɛkˈsandɐr ˈasɛn]; original spelling: ІѠАНЪ АЛЄѮАН^{д}РЪ), also known just as Ivan Alexander, sometimes anglicized as John Alexander, ruled as Emperor (Tsar) of Bulgaria from 1331 to 1371, during the Second Bulgarian Empire. The date of his birth is unknown. He died on 17 February 1371.

The long reign of Ivan Alexander Asen is considered a transitional period in Bulgarian medieval history. The Tsar began his rule by dealing with internal problems and external threats from Bulgaria's neighbours, the Byzantine Empire and Serbia, as well as leading his empire into a period of economic recovery and cultural and religious renaissance.

However, the emperor was later unable to cope with the mounting incursions of Ottoman forces, Hungarian invasions from the northwest and the Black Death. In an ill-fated attempt to combat these problems, he divided the country between his two sons, thus forcing it to face the imminent Ottoman conquest weakened and divided.

== Early rule ==
Ivan Alexander was the son of the Despot Sratsimir of Kran by Petrica, a sister of Michael Asen III of Bulgaria. Therefore, Ivan Alexander was a nephew of Michael Asen III. Paternally, Ivan Alexander descended from the Asen dynasty. By 1330 Ivan Alexander was a despot and governed the city of Lovech. Together with his father and his father-in-law Basarab of Wallachia, Ivan Alexander fought in the Battle of Velbazhd against the Serbs at modern-day Kyustendil in 1330, in which Bulgaria suffered a defeat. The defeat, combined with the worsening relations with the Byzantine Empire, precipitated an internal crisis, which was exacerbated by an invasion of the Byzantines. A coup d'état drove Ivan Stefan out of the capital Tarnovo in 1331, and the conspirators placed Ivan Alexander on the throne.

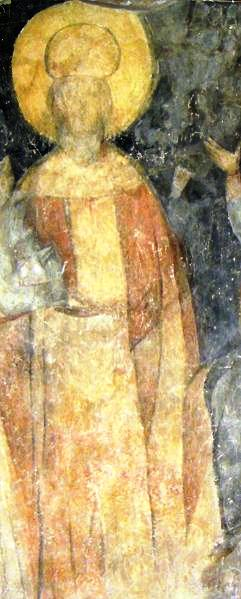
A contemporary mural portrait of Ivan Alexander from the Rock-hewn Churches of Ivanovo

The new ruler set about consolidating his position by regaining territories recently lost to the Byzantine Empire. In 1331 Ivan Alexander Asen campaigned around Adrianople and reconquered northeastern Thrace. Meanwhile, Stefan Uroš IV Dušan deposed his father Stefan Uroš III Dečanski and became Serbian king in 1331. This helped normalize the previously tense relations between the two countries. Ivan Alexander Asen and Stefan Uroš IV Dušan concluded an alliance, which was cemented by the marriage of the Serbian king to Helena of Bulgaria, a sister of Ivan Alexander, on Easter 1332.

At about the same time, Belaur, a brother of Michael Asen III, rebelled in Vidin, probably in support of his deposed nephew Ivan Stefan's claim to the throne. The advance of the Byzantine Emperor Andronikos III Palaiologos against Bulgaria in the summer of 1332 protracted military operations against the rebels. The Byzantines overran Bulgarian-controlled northeastern Thrace, but Ivan Alexander Asen rushed southward with a small army and swiftly caught up with Andronikos III at Rusokastro.

Nobody of our first tsars seems to us like this great tsar Ivan Alexander, in his military power he looks to us like a second ancient Alexander the Great, in faith and piety he is a second Saint Constantine; he captured thus all his enemies, put them under his knees and established firm peace in the Universe.

— Praise to Ivan Alexander by an anonymous contemporary of the tsar

After giving the impression that he wished to negotiate, Ivan Alexander Asen, reinforced by Mongol cavalry, overwhelmed the smaller but better organized Byzantine army in the Battle of Rusokastro. The contested cities surrendered to Ivan Alexander Asen, while Andronikos III sought refuge within the walls of Rusokastro. The war ended with Ivan Alexander meeting Andronikos and agreeing a peace based on the status quo.

To seal the alliance, he betrothed his eldest son, Michael Asen IV, to Andronikos's daughter Maria (Eirene), the marriage taking place in 1339. The Bulgarian emperor was now free to turn his attentions to Belaur, but it was not until 1336 or 1337 that the rebellion in the northwest was put down.

In about 1332, Ivan Alexander Asen had crowned his eldest son Michael Asen IV co-emperor, perhaps to safeguard possession of the throne by his own family. He followed up this traditional association with the coronation of his younger sons Ivan Sracimir and Ivan Asen IV in 1337. Ivan Alexander Asen may have intended the creation of two younger co-emperors to establish immediate control over important cities and regions, as Ivan Sracimir was eventually based in Vidin, and Ivan Asen IV perhaps in Preslav. Nevertheless, this was a marked departure from Byzantine practice, in which younger sons of the sovereign were made despots, whether they were charged with a territorial administration or not.

== Relations with the Byzantine Empire ==
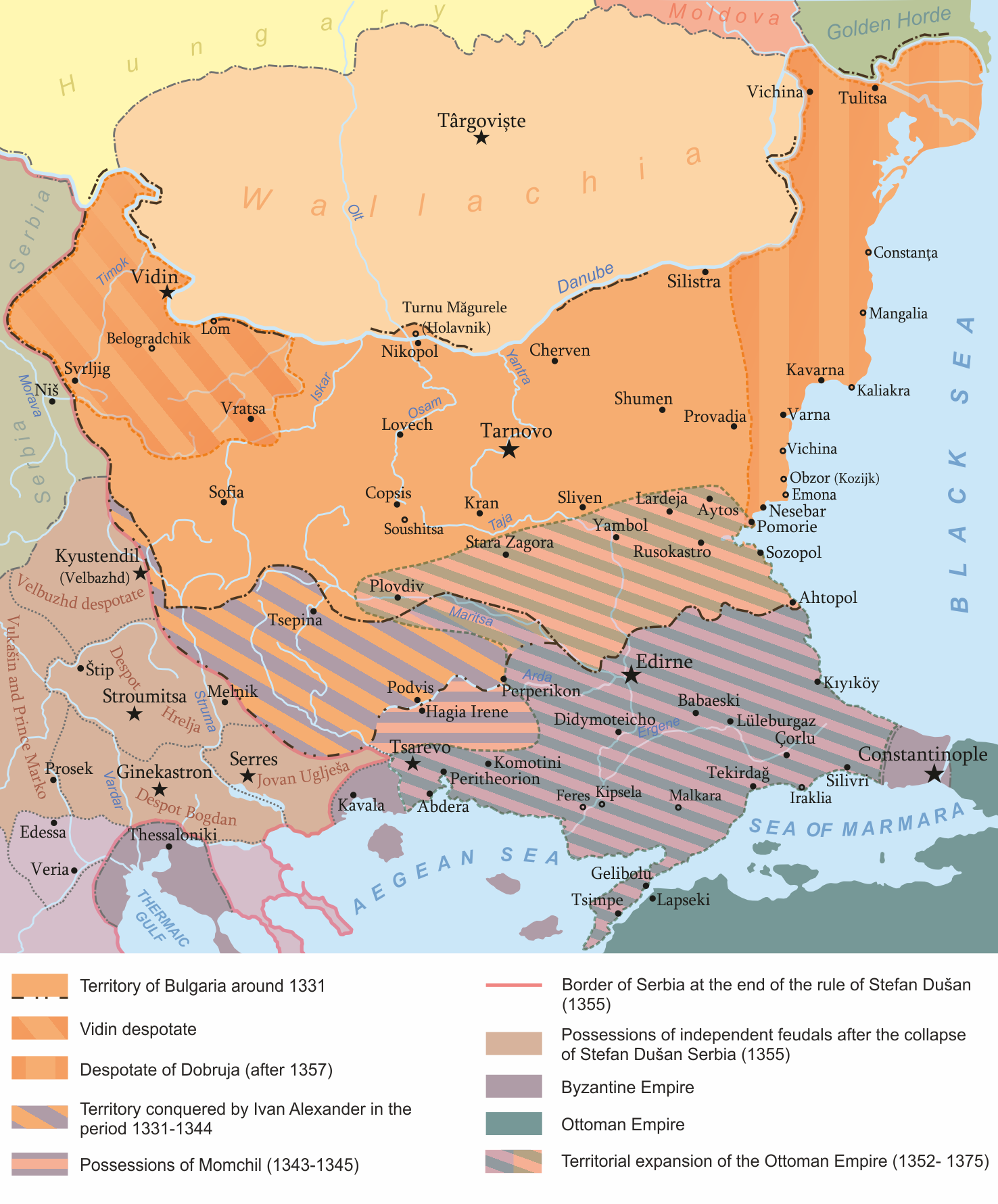
The Bulgarian lands during the reign of Ivan Alexander

In the early 1340s relations with the Byzantine Empire temporarily deteriorated. Ivan Alexander Asen demanded the extradition of his cousin Šišman, one of the sons of Michael Asen III, threatening the Byzantine government with war. Ivan Alexander Asen's show of force backfired, as the Byzantines managed to see through his intentions and sent against him the fleet of their ally, the Turkish emir of Smyrna Umur Beg.

Landing in the Danube Delta, they pillaged the countryside and attacked nearby Bulgarian cities. Forced to restrain his demands, Ivan Alexander invaded the Byzantine Empire again at the end of 1341, claiming that he was summoned by the people of Adrianople. Ivan Alexander's troops were defeated twice by Turkish allies of the Byzantines near the city.

In 1341–1347, the Byzantine Empire was plunged into a protracted civil war between the regency for Emperor John V Palaiologos under Anna of Savoy and his intended guardian John VI Kantakouzenos. The neighbours of the Byzantines took advantage of the civil war, and while Stefan Uroš IV Dušan of Serbia sided with John VI Kantakouzenos, Ivan Alexander Asen backed John V Palaiologos and his regency. Although the two Balkan rulers picked opposite sides in the Byzantine civil war, they maintained their alliance with each other. As the price for Ivan Alexander Asen's support, the regency for John V Palaiologos ceded him the city of Philippopolis (Plovdiv) and nine important fortresses in the Rhodope Mountains in 1344. This peaceful turnover constituted the last major success of Ivan Alexander's foreign policy.

== Rise of Serbia and the Ottoman threat ==
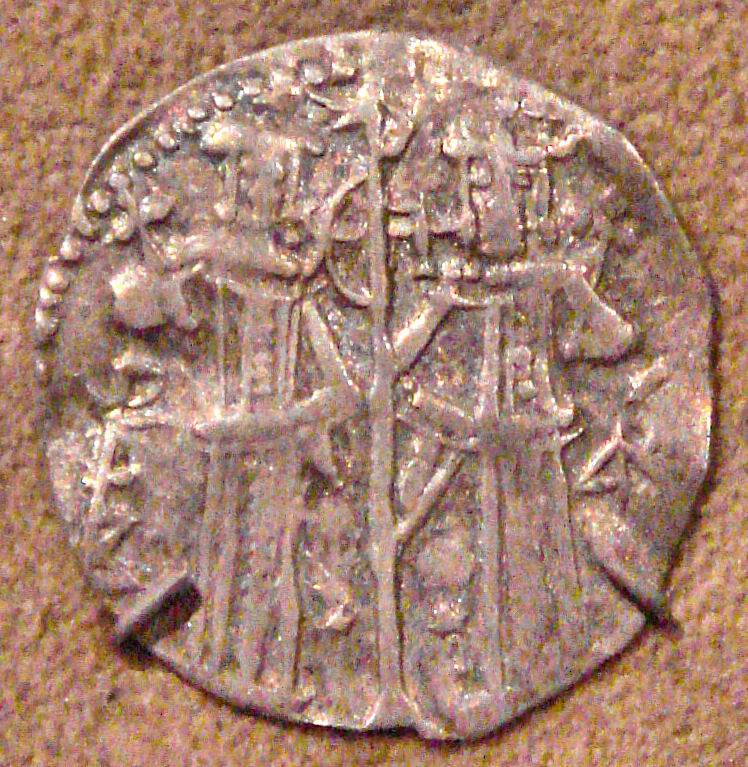
A silver coin of Ivan Alexander, Bulgaria, 1331–1371

During the same period, the Serbian king took advantage of the Byzantine civil war to take possession of what is now Macedonia, and of most of Albania and northern Greece. In 1345, he began to call himself "Emperor of Serbs and Greeks", and in 1346 he was crowned as such by the newly created Serbian Patriarch. These actions, which the Byzantines received with indignation, appear to have been supported by Bulgaria, as the Patriarch of Bulgaria Simeon had participated in both the creation of a Serbian Patriarchate of Peć and the imperial coronation of Stefan Uroš IV Dušan.

By the second half of the 1340s, little remained of Ivan Alexander's initial successes. John VI Kantakouzenos' Turkish allies pillaged parts of Bulgarian Thrace in 1346, 1347, 1349, 1352 and 1354, to which were added the ravages of the Black Death. The Bulgarians' attempts to repel the invaders met with repeated failure, and Ivan Alexander's third son and co-emperor, Ivan Asen IV, was killed in battle against the Turks in 1349, as was his older brother Michael Asen IV in 1355 or a little earlier.

By 1351 the Byzantine civil war was over, and John VI Kantakouzenos had realized the threat posed by the Ottomans to the Balkan Peninsula. He appealed to the rulers of Serbia and Bulgaria for a united effort against the Turks and asked Ivan Alexander Asen for money to construct warships, but his appeals fell on deaf ears as his neighbours distrusted his intentions. A new attempt for cooperation between Bulgaria and the Byzantine Empire followed in 1355, after John VI Kantakouzenos had been forced to abdicate and John V Palaiologos had been established as supreme emperor. To cement the treaty, Ivan Alexander's daughter Keraca Marija was married off to the future Byzantine Emperor Andronikos IV Palaiologos, but the alliance failed to produce concrete results.

== Further stability problems and external conflicts ==
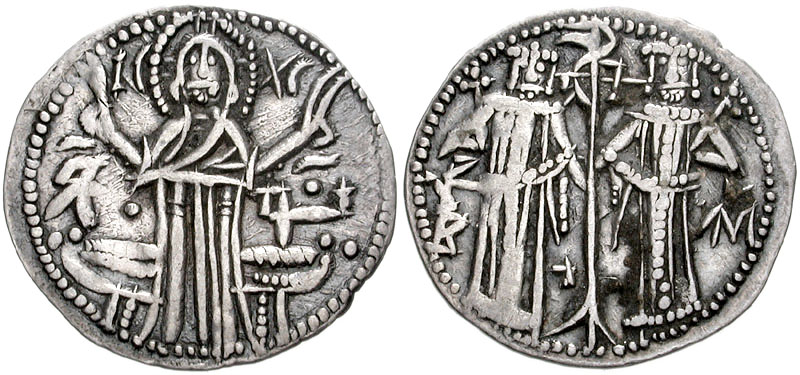
A coin depicting Ivan Alexander with one of his sons, co-emperor Michael Asen IV (right)

At home Ivan Alexander Asen compromised the internal stability of his realm by divorcing his first wife Theodora of Wallachia (in about 1349) and marrying a converted Jew, also named Theodora. The new marriage produced new sons, whom Ivan Alexander Asen proceeded to crown co-emperors, Ivan Šišman in about 1356 and Ivan Asen V by 1359. Ivan Alexander Asen's last surviving son from his first marriage, the co-emperor Ivan Sracimir, became effectively independent around 1356; and Ivan Alexander Asen's control over other powerful vassals, such as the rulers of Wallachia and Dobruja, who pursued their own foreign policies, was hardly stronger.

From the middle of the 14th century, Bulgaria fell prey to the aspirations of the Angevin king Louis I of Hungary, who annexed Moldavia in 1352 and established a vassal principality there, before conquering Vidin in 1365, and taking Ivan Sratsimir and his family into captivity.

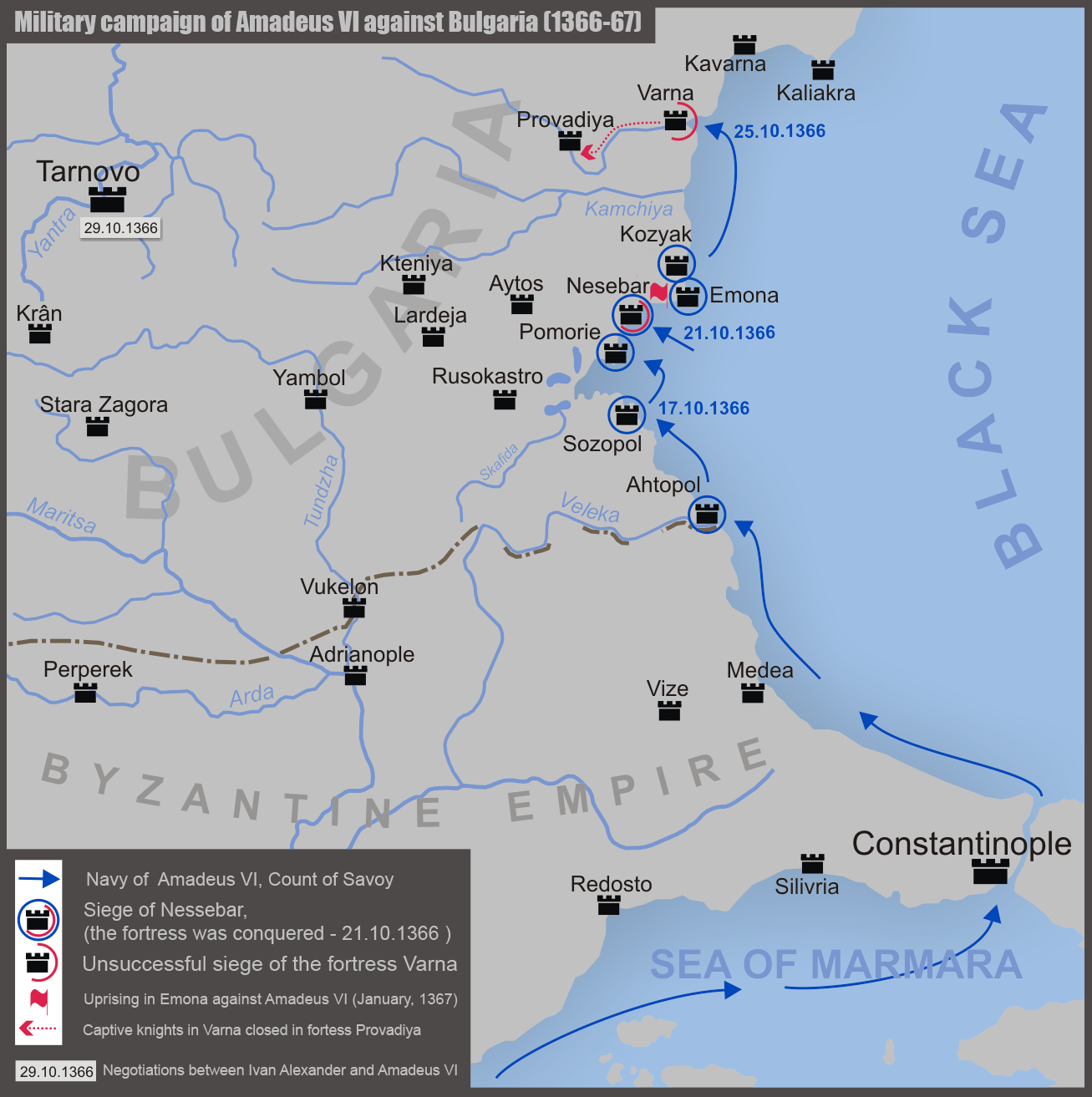
The military campaign of Amadeus VI against Bulgaria, 1366–67

In the meantime Bulgarians and Byzantines had clashed again in 1364. In 1366, when Emperor John V Palaiologos was returning from his trip to the west, the Bulgarians refused to let him pass through Bulgaria. This stance backfired, as another Byzantine ally, Count Amadeus VI of Savoy, leading the Savoyard crusade, captured several Bulgarian maritime cities in retaliation, including Ankhialos (Pomorie) and Mesembria (Nesebǎr), though he failed to take Varna. Outmanoeuvred, Ivan Alexander was forced to make peace.

The captured cities were turned over to the Byzantine Empire, while Emperor John V Palaiologos paid the sum of 180,000 florins to Ivan Alexander. The Bulgarian emperor used this sum and territorial concessions to induce his at least de jure vassal Dobrotica of Dobruja and Vladislav I of Wallachia to reconquer Vidin from the Hungarians. The war was successful, and Ivan Sracimir was reinstalled in Vidin in 1369, although the Hungarian king forced him to acknowledge his overlordship.

The relatively successful resolution of the crisis in the northwest did nothing to help recover the losses in the southeast. To make matters worse, in 1369 (the date is disputed), the Ottoman Turks under Murad I conquered Adrianople (in 1363) and made it the effective capital of their expanding state. At the same time, they also captured the Bulgarian cities of Philippopolis and Boruj (Stara Zagora). As Bulgaria and the Serbian feudal lords in Macedonia as Konstantin Dragas and Prince Marko prepared for united action against the Turks, Ivan Alexander Asen died on 17 February 1371. He was succeeded by his sons Ivan Sratsimir in Vidin and Ivan Shishman in Tarnovo, while the rulers of Dobruja and Wallachia achieved further independence.

== Culture and religion ==
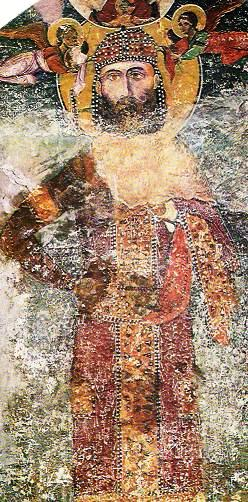
A contemporary donor portrait in fresco of Ivan Alexander from the Bachkovo Monastery ossuary

During Ivan Alexander Asen's rule, the Second Bulgarian Empire entered a period of cultural renaissance, which is sometimes referred to as the "Second Golden Age of Bulgarian culture", the original one being the rule of Simeon the Great. A large number of Bulgarian monasteries and churches were constructed or renovated on the order of Ivan Alexander Asen. Mural portraits of him as a donor can be seen in the Bachkovo Monastery's ossuary and in the Rock-hewn Churches of Ivanovo.

Donor's deeds of Ivan Alexander Asen prove that the monasteries of the Holy Mother of God Eleoussa and St Nicholas in Nesebǎr were reconstructed during that period, as was the St Nicholas monastery near Pernik, according to a Hilandar monastery deed. In addition, the tsar also initiated the construction of the Dragalevci and Kilifarevo monasteries.

Literary activity also flourished during the reign of Ivan Alexander Asen. Several important literary works were created in the period, such as the Middle Bulgarian translation of the Manasses Chronicle (1344–1345), currently preserved in the Vatican Secret Archives in Rome, the richly illustrated Tetraevangelia of Ivan Alexander (1355–1356), now exhibited in the British Library, the Tomić Psalter (1360), today in Moscow, and the Sofia Psalter (1337).

Ivan Alexander Asen's rule was also marked by efforts to strengthen the position of the Bulgarian Orthodox Church by pursuing heretics and Jews. He organized two anti-heretical church councils, in 1350 and 1359–1360, that condemned various sects such as the Bogomils, the Adamites and the Judaizers.

The spiritual practice of hesychasm, a form of incantatory prayer, deeply influenced certain areas of the Eastern Orthodox world of the 14th century. A notable Bulgarian representative of the movement during Ivan Alexander's reign was Theodosius of Tǎrnovo.

During this time, the Bulgarian Empire had trade relations with the Mediterranean maritime powers Venice, Genoa and Ragusa. In 1353, Ivan Alexander Asen issued a charter allowing Venetian merchants to buy and sell goods throughout Bulgaria after Doge Andrea Dandolo assured him they would observe the prior treaties between the two countries.

In modern times, the rule of Ivan Alexander Asen inspired Bulgarian national writer Ivan Vazov to write the novelette Ivan-Aleksandǎr and the drama Kǎm propast (Towards an Abyss), in both of which the tsar is the main character.

A piece of a garment signed by Ivan Alexander Asen and interwoven with gold was discovered in a noble's grave near Pirot in the 1970s; today it is preserved in the National Museum of Serbia in Belgrade. It is the first find of its kind, demonstrating a medieval tradition attested in writing according to which Orthodox rulers would present their most eminent dignitaries with a piece of a garment they had worn.

Ivan Alexander Point on Nelson Island in the South Shetland Islands, Antarctica is named after Ivan Alexander of Bulgaria.

== Family ==
With his first wife Theodora of Wallachia (nun Teofana), a daughter of Basarab I, he had:

- Tsar Ivan Sratsimir of Bulgaria (1324/1328 – 1394), succeeded his father as the next Emperor of Bulgaria.
- Prince Michail Asen (c. 1322–1355), Bulgarian Prince
- Prince Ivan Asen IV (1326 – 1349)

With his second wife Sarah-Theodora, Ivan Alexander had several other children:

- Princess Kera Tamara (1340 – 1389); firstly married Despot Constantine (Konstantin) and then become a concubine of Sultan Murad I of the Ottoman Empire
- Tsar Ivan Shishman of Bulgaria (1350 – 3 June 1395)
- Princess Desislava of Bulgaria
- Prince Ivan Asen V of Bulgaria (d. 1388)
- Princess Keratsa of Bulgaria (1348 – 1390), married byzantine emperor Andronikos IV Palaiologos and had a son (John VII Palaiologos)
- Princess Vasilisa of Bulgaria
Family tree of Ivan Alexander

Sracimir of Krǎn	Petrica
1	2
Theodora of Wallachia	Ivan Alexander (d. 1371, ruled 1331–1371)	Sarah (Theodora)
1	1	1	1	2	2	2	2	2
Michael Asen IV	Thamar (Kera Tamara)	Ivan Šišman (b. 1350–1351, d. 1395, ruled 1371–1395)	Ivan Asen V	Vasilisa
Ivan Asen IV	Ivan Sracimir (b. c. 1324, d. c. 1397, ruled 1356–1397)	Keraca Marija (b. 1348, d. 1390)	Desislava

== Timeline ==
Timeline of Ivan Alexander's life

== Notes ==
Preceded by Ivan Stephen	Emperor of Bulgaria; 1331–1371	Succeeded by Ivan Sratsimir; Ivan Shishman
