= Medieval Bulgarian army =

Medieval military body

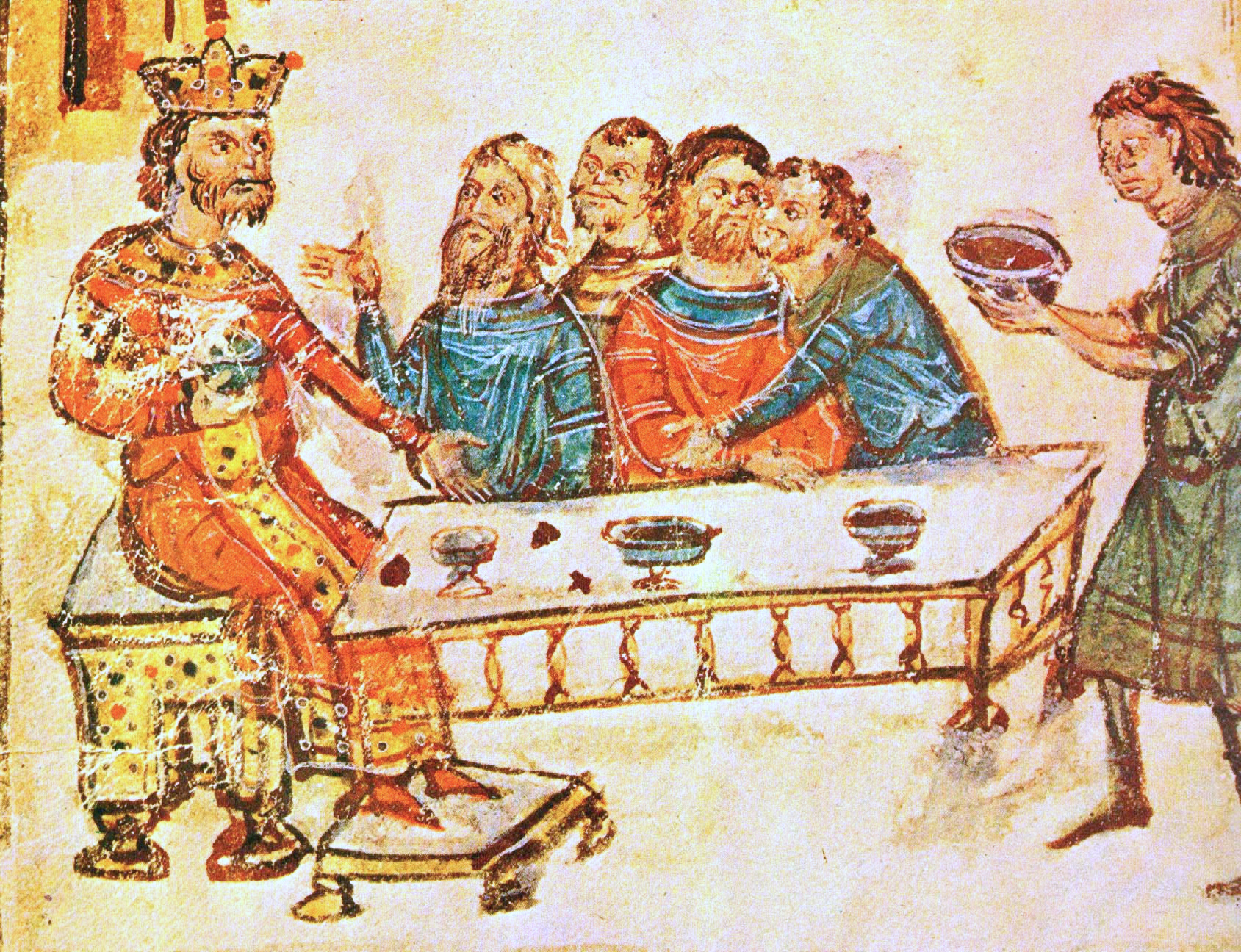
- Khan Krum feasts with a skull cup made of Emperor Nicephorus I's head following the victory in the battle of Pliska.
- Leaders: Bulgarian Emperor (Commander-in-chief)
- Dates active: 632/680 – 1396/1422 AD
- Active regions: Balkans, Central Europe - Pannonia, Pontic–Caspian steppe
- Size: c. 12,000 up to 15,000
- Part of: Bulgarian Empire
- Wars: the wars of the Bulgarian Empire

The medieval Bulgarian army was the primary military body of the First and the Second Bulgarian Empires, and some puppet states of the former, like the Despotate of Dobruja. During the first decades after the foundation of the country, the army consisted of a Bulgar cavalry and a Slavic infantry. The core of the Bulgarian army was the heavy cavalry, which consisted of ca. 12,000 heavily armed riders. At its height in the 9th and 10th centuries, it was one of the most formidable military forces in Europe and was feared by its enemies. There are several documented cases of Byzantine commanders abandoning an invasion because of a reluctance to confront the Bulgarian army on its home territory.

The army was intrinsically linked to the very existence of the Bulgarian state. Its success under Tsar Simeon I the Great marked the creation of a wide-ranging empire, and its defeat in a prolonged war of attrition in the early 11th century meant the end of Bulgarian independence. When the Bulgarian state was reestablished in 1185, a series of capable emperors achieved a remarkable string of victories over the Byzantines and the Western Crusaders, but as the state and its army fragmented in the 13th and 14th centuries, it proved unable to halt the Ottoman advance, which resulted in the conquest of all of Bulgaria by 1396/1422. It would not be until 1878, with the Liberation of Bulgaria, that a Bulgarian military would be restored.

== History ==
=== 7th–8th century ===
The early Bulgars were a warlike people and war was part of their everyday life, with every adult Bulgar obliged to fight. The early Bulgars were exclusively horsemen: in their culture, the horse was considered a sacred animal and received special care.

The supreme commander was the khan, who mustered the army with the help of the aristocracy. The military ranks from lowest to highest were bagain, bagatur, boil, tarkhan. The permanent army consisted of the khan's guard of select warriors, while the campaign army consisted practically of the entire nation, assembled by clans. In the field, the army was divided into right and left wings.

The Bulgars were well versed in the use of stratagems. They often held a strong cavalry unit in reserve, which would attack the enemy at an opportune moment. They also sometimes concentrated their free horses behind their battle formation to avoid surprise attacks from the rear. They used ambushes and feigned retreats, during which they rode with their backs to the horse, firing clouds of arrows on the enemy. If the enemy pursued disorganized, they would turn back and fiercely attack them. According to contemporary historians, the Bulgars "could see in the dark like bats" and often fought at night.

When they make their enemies take to flight, they [...] are not content, as the Persians, the Romans [Byzantines] and other peoples, with pursuing them a reasonable distance and plundering their goods, but they do not let up at all until they have achieved the complete destruction of their enemies.

— On the tactics employed by the Bulgars,
Strategikon of Maurice, Ch. 13.2

The Bulgarian army was well armed according to the Avar model: the soldiers had a sabre or a sword, a long spear and a bow with an arrow-quiver on the back. On the saddle they hung a round shield, a mace and a lasso, which the Bulgarians called arkani. On their decorated belts the soldiers carried the most necessary objects such as flints and steel, a knife, a cup and a needle case. The heavy cavalry was supplied with metal armour and helmets. The horses were also armoured. Armour was of two types — chain-mail and plate armour. The commanders had belts with golden or silver buckles which corresponded to their rank and title.

The army had iron discipline, with the officers vigorously checking if everything was ready before a battle. For a horse that was undernourished or not properly taken care of, the punishment was death. The soldiers were under threat of a death penalty when having a loose bow-string or an unmaintained sword; or even if riding a war horse in peacetime.

The infantry of the newly formed state was composed mainly of Slavs, who were generally lightly armed soldiers, although their chieftains usually had small cavalry retinues. The Slavic footmen were equipped with swords, spears, bows and wooden or leather shields. However, they were less disciplined and less effective than the Bulgar cavalry.

In 680, the Byzantines under Constantine IV were crushed in the battle of Ongal and were forced to conclude a humiliating peace treaty by which they de jure acknowledged the formation of a Bulgarian state on their former territory. In 718, a Bulgarian intervention was crucial in the repulsion of the Second Arab Siege of Constantinople. According to contemporaries, the Arabs feared the Bulgarian army and built trenches to protect themselves from a cavalry charge. In the decisive battle in the summer that year the Bulgarians slaughtered between 20,000 and 32,000 Arabs. Apart from engaging in battle to the south, the Bulgarians had to fight the Avars to the north-west and the Khazars to the north-east. After bloody fights between the Dnester and the Dneper rivers, the Khazar threat was eliminated but the founder of the Bulgarian state Khan Asparukh perished in one of the battles in 700.

=== Krum's dynasty ===
On the turn of the 9th century, the Bulgarian Empire was on the rise. Following the victory over the Byzantines at Marcelae in 792, the country overcame a 50-year crisis and entered the new century stronger and consolidated. During the first years of his reign, Khan Krum destroyed the Avar Khaganate and doubled Bulgaria's territory, taking over the fertile Pannonian Plain and the salt and gold mines of Transylvania. Krum achieved major victories over the Byzantine Empire, annihilating the Byzantine armies in the battle of Pliska (811) and at Versinikia (813), while capturing the important city of Sofia in 809.

Simeon arrived, leading a large army, which was divided into many squads, some armed with golden shields and golden spears, others with silver shields and silver spears, third with weapons of every colour and all dressed in iron.

— Theophanes

The Byzantine historian Pseudo-Simeon stated that Krum sent a 30,000 strong cavalry, "the whole armoured with iron", which devastated Thrace. According to inscriptions found in the region of Pliska, Preslav, Madara and Shabla in north-eastern Bulgaria, armaments for 1,713 heavy riders were available. Assuming that the surviving inscriptions are around 1/10 of the total number, that makes 17,130 men only in the so-called "inner region" of Bulgaria. After comparison with the data of Pseudo-Simeon, it can be assumed that the heavy cavalry component of the Bulgarian army numbered between 17–20,000 and 30,000 men, depending on the level of mobilization. During the end of the 9th and the beginning of the 10th centuries, Emperor Simeon the Great was able to lead in battle more than 60,000 soldiers.

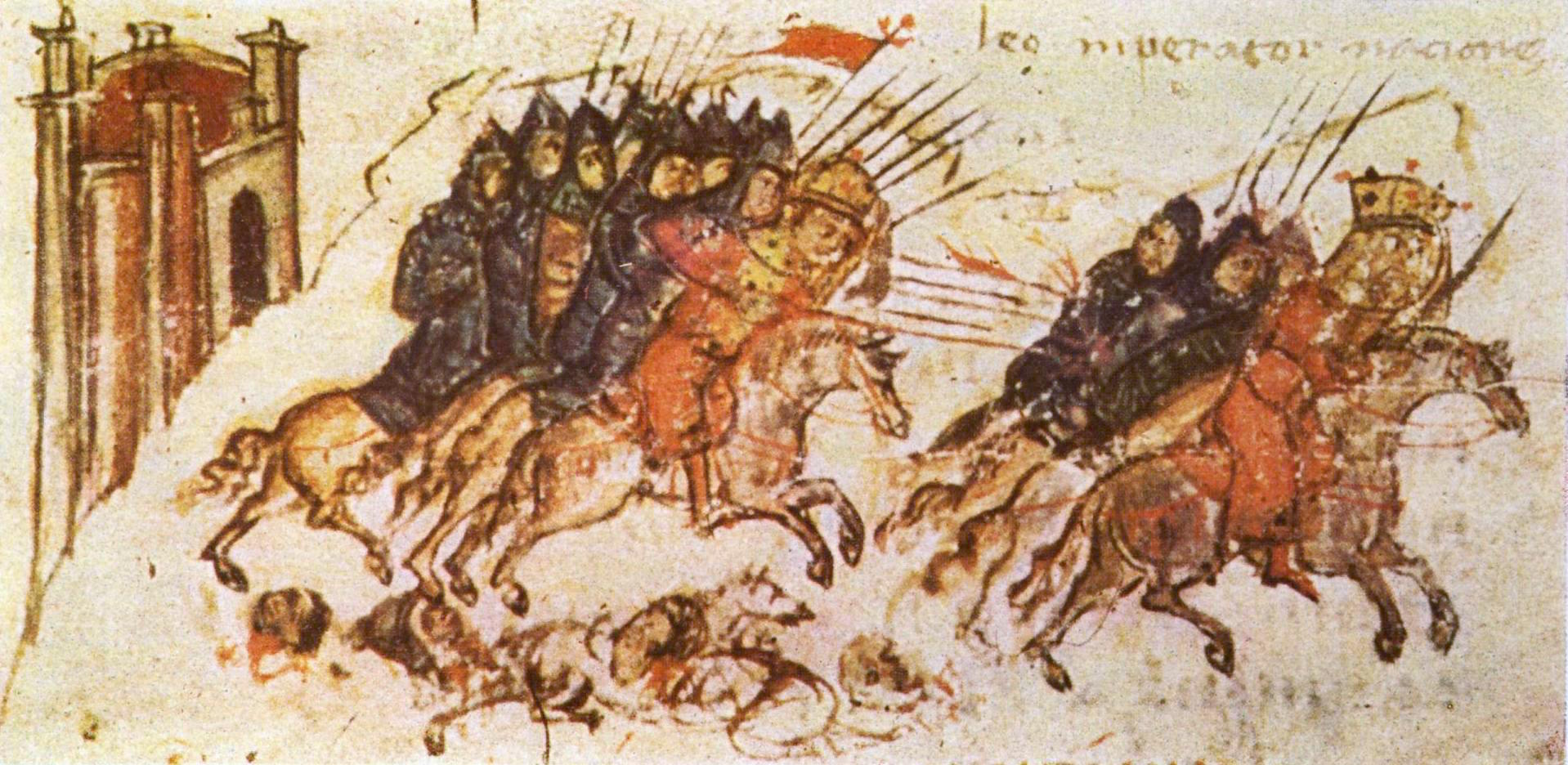
The Bulgarians crush the Byzantine army in the battle of Versinikia.

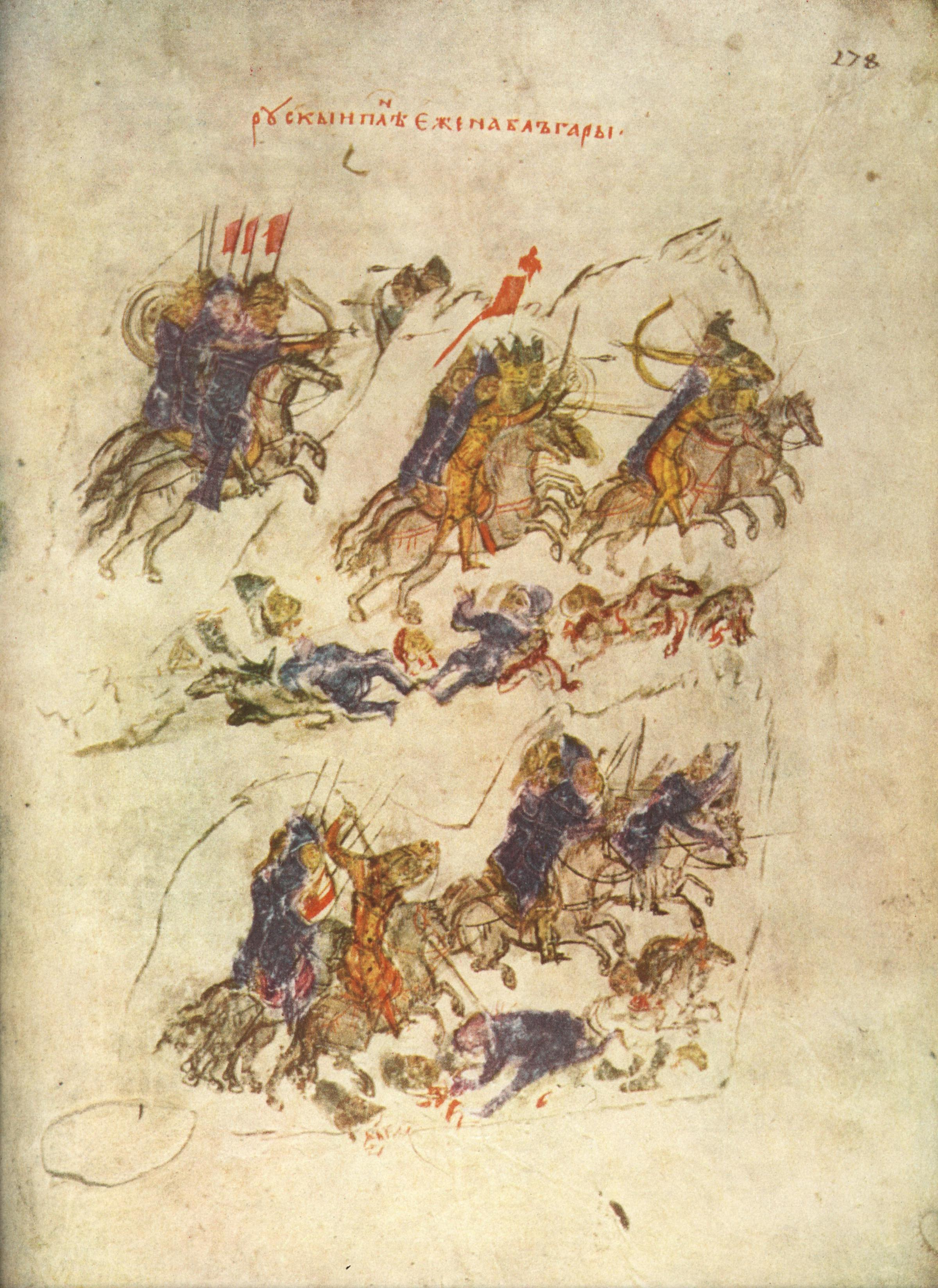
The Rus' invasion of Bulgaria.

Traditionally, the army's commander-in-chief was the ruler. The second in the chain of command was the kavkhan who led the army during the Emperor's absence. The third most important title in the hierarchy was the ichirgu-boil who commanded the garrison of the capital. In the field, the army was divided into three parts: center, right flank and left flank. The center was commanded by the ruler, the left flank by the kavkhan and the right flank by the ichirgu-boil. Other higher military ranks included the tarkhan which was equal to the Byzantine strategos according to Steven Runciman, and the higher officers were called bagain. All higher military ranks were part of the Bulgarian nobility called bolyars or boils.

==== Decline under Peter I ====
During the long years of warfare under Tsar Simeon I the Great (893–927), the country was exhausted. The constant wars were unpopular enough so that 20,000 people sought refuge in Byzantium because of Simeon's "warlike rush and relentless intentions". His successor Peter I concluded a favourable peace treaty with the Byzantines, but the situation inside the country saw no improvement. There were many reasons for the decline — some historians dismiss Peter I as a weak ruler, incapable of handling his own family (two of his brothers rose up against him). Furthermore, in the mid-10th century the new Bogomil heresy spread itself widely over the country. The Bogomils preached that people must not follow secular authorities, pay taxes or enroll in the army. As a result, the Bulgarians were unable to stop the Magyars, who looted and plundered the countryside, further contributing to the grim situation of the state. When the Byzantines paid the Rus' knyaz Svyatoslav I to invade Bulgaria in 968, Peter I could send only 30,000 men against the 60,000 strong invading force. During the Rus' invasion between 968 and 971 the Bulgarians de facto lost control of the north-eastern parts of their country, including the capital Preslav, and in 970, Svyatoslav massacred 300 Bulgarian nobles, the elite of the Bulgarian nation and army, in Silistra.

=== Cometopuli dynasty ===
The fall of the north-eastern parts of the Bulgarian Empire under Byzantine rule and the decimation of its military elite had a severe impact on the Bulgarian army, especially since most of the heavy cavalry which was instrumental in the earlier successes over the Byzantines was recruited exactly in that region. Contemporary sources continue to mention the existence of a Bulgarian cavalry, but it was much reduced in size and was mostly light cavalry.

Even if the sun would have come down, I would have never thought that the Moesian [Bulgarian] arrows were stronger than the Avzonian [Roman, Byzantine] spears...

— Byzantine writer John Geometres
on the battle of the Gates of Trajan.

Consequently, the infantry's importance grew and the tactics changed to reflect the new conditions: the ambush, although employed in the past, now became the cornerstone of Bulgarian tactics — most Bulgarian victories in that period were a result of ambush and careful exploitation of the terrain. During this period, the Bulgarians acquired a reputation for their skillful archers.

Despite those difficulties, Emperor Samuil resisted the Byzantine army, which reached its zenith under Basil II, for nearly half a century. In 976 the Bulgarians led by the Cometopuli brothers reconquered the north-eastern parts of the realm. The first Byzantine attempts for counter-attack were repulsed after the annihilation of a 60,000 force in the battle of the Gates of Trajan in 986 in which Basil II himself barely escaped. In the following decade the Bulgarians took Thessaly, destroyed the Principality of Duklja, advanced deep to the south as far as Corinth on the Peloponnese peninsula and campaigned in Dalmatia and Bosnia.

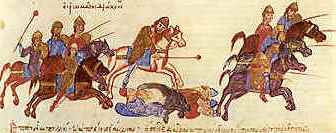
The battle of Spercheios.

However, a major defeat at the battle of Spercheios in 996 signaled that the tide of the war had begun to change in the Byzantines' favour. From 1001 onwards, Basil II launched yearly campaigns into Bulgarian territory, methodically taking important cities such as Preslav, Pliska and Vidin, and inflicting several defeats on Samuil. In addition, in 1003 Samuil was involved in a war with the Kingdom of Hungary. After years of campaigning, in 1014, in the decisive battle of Kleidion the Bulgarian army was crushed and 14,000 captured Bulgarian soldiers were blinded and sent to Samuil, who died at the sight of his army on 6 October.

In the battle of Kleidion the Bulgarian army numbered around 20,000 soldiers. According some estimates the total number of the army including the squads of local militia reached a maximum level of 45,000. The Byzantine historian Georgius Monachus Continuatus wrote that the Bulgarian army had 360,000 men, a greatly exaggerated number, the actual being 10 times smaller.

=== Asen dynasty ===
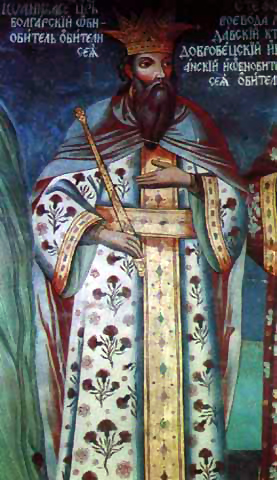
Emperor Ivan Asen II brought the Second Bulgarian Empire to its greatest expansion.

In 1185 the Bulgarian Empire was restored as a result of the successful Rebellion of Asen and Peter, who founded the new Asen dynasty. The long period of Byzantine rule had left its mark on the Bulgarian army — the titles during the Second Empire were mostly borrowed from Byzantium. In the absence of the Emperor the commander-in-chief was called velik (great) voivoda; the commander of smaller squads was a voivoda and a strator was the person responsible for the defense of certain regions and the recruitment of soldiers.

In the late 12th century the army numbered 40,000 men-at-arms. The country was able to mobilize around 100,000 men in the first decade of the 13th century (Kaloyan reportedly offered the leader of the Fourth Crusade Baldwin I 100,000 soldiers to help him take Constantinople). In that period the Bulgarian army used large numbers of Cuman cavalry which numbered between 10,000 and 30,000 riders, depending on the campaign. These were drawn from among the Cumans who inhabited Wallachia and Moldavia, and were at least nominally under the suzerainty of the Bulgarian Emperors. The army was well supplied with siege equipment, including battering rams, siege towers and catapults.

This combat lasted a long time... There on the field remained the Emperor Baldwin, who never would fly, and Count Louis; the Emperor Baldwin was taken alive and Count Louis was slain. Alas! How awful was our loss!

— Crusader chronicler Geoffrey of Villehardouin on the battle of Adrianople.

In the first fifty years after the reestablishment of the Empire, the Bulgarians, led by skillful commanders such as Peter IV, Ivan Asen I, Kaloyan and Ivan Asen II, achieved massive military successes. After a number of successful battles between 1185 and 1204, the Byzantine Empire was effectively driven from the lands it held in the northern Balkans, and the Imperial crown and cross. The army of the Crusaders, who established the new Latin Empire, were in turn annihilated in the battle of Adrianople (1205), when their Emperor was captured, and again at Rusion in 1206. The Hungarians were defeated after several fights along the valley of the Morava river in 1202. After several setbacks under Boril I (1207–1218), Ivan Asen II decisively defeated the Despotate of Epirus in the battle of Klokotnitsa, in which the much smaller Bulgarian army outmaneuvered its enemy. In 1241, the Tsar defeated a Mongol army, fighting under Batu Khan and Subutai.

=== Terter and Shishman dynasties ===
The country and the army declined after Ivan Asen II's death. His successors could not cope neither with the external nor with the internal problems. Mongol, Byzantine and Hungarian invasions were combined with separatism among the nobility and several civil wars. In 1277, a peasant named Ivailo rebelled against Emperor Constantine Tikh. In the ensuing battle the Emperor was defeated and slain, and Ivailo proclaimed himself Emperor of Bulgaria in Tarnovo. Although he managed to defeat both the Mongols and the Byzantines, a plot among the nobility forced him to seek refuge among the Mongol Golden Horde, where he was killed in 1280. The army now numbered less than 10,000 men — it is recorded that Ivailo defeated two Byzantine armies of 5,000 and 10,000 men, and that his troops were outnumbered in both cases.

In the country of the people there was no knyaz, no commander, no saviour, no redeemer. Everything vanished under the fear of the Turks. Even the brave hearts of the champions turned into weak feminine hearts. Those who remained alive fairly envied at the dead.

— The monk Isay, a witness to the Ottoman invasion

After the end of the rebellion of Ivailo, the Bulgarians were no match for the Mongols who plundered the country undisturbed for 20 years. With the reign of Theodore Svetoslav (1300–1321), the situation of the army improved — in 1304 he defeated the Byzantines at Skafida. Under his successor the garrison of Plovdiv numbered 2,000 heavily armed footmen and 1,000 horsemen. In 1330 Michael III Shishman raised a 15,000-strong army to face the Serbs but was defeated at the battle of Velbazhd. Two years later the Bulgarian army numbered 11,000 men.

When the Ottoman Turks invaded Bulgaria and the Balkans in the mid-14th century, the once glorious Bulgarian army was only a shadow of its former self. Feudal disunion and the widespread heretical movements such as Bogomilism, the Adamites or the Varlaamites did not allow the country to maintain a significant force. The Bulgarians relied on their fortified cities and castles for defense, but due to the lack of a common leadership, coordination amongst them was feeble and they were defeated and occupied in detail.

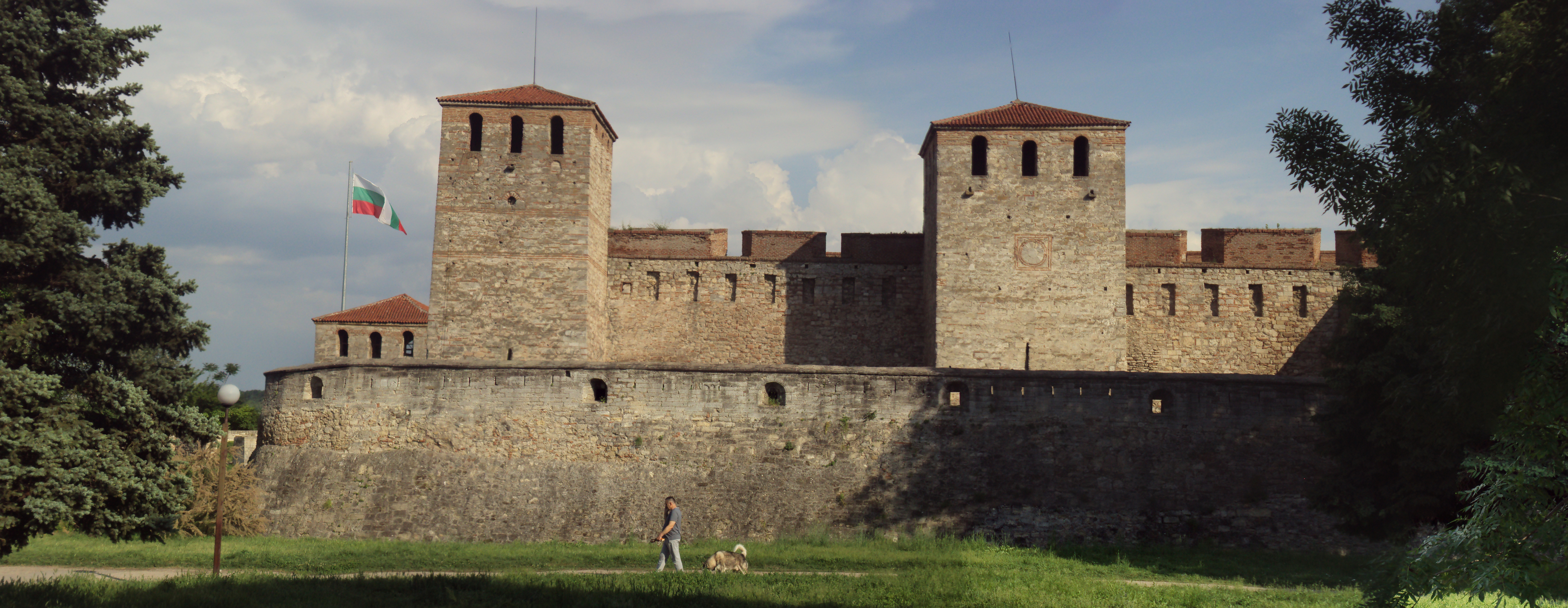
The castle Baba Vida in Vidin used to be an important Bulgarian stronghold. It was the last major Bulgarian fortress which fell to the Ottomans.

Initially, the Ottoman invasion was not considered as a significant threat by both Bulgarians and Byzantines. For only one decade between 1354 and 1364 the Ottomans conquered virtually the whole of Thrace seizing large cities such as Plovdiv, Beroia, Dianopolis (Yambol) and Adrianople and defeating several small Bulgarian forces. The centuries-old mistrust between Bulgarians and Byzantines spoiled the negotiations between the two empires for an alliance and even led to the last Byzantine-Bulgarian war in 1364. In 1371 a large Bulgarian-Serb army under Vukašin Mrnjavčević and Jovan Uglješa, two feudal lords in Macedonia, was annihilated by the Ottomans under Lala Shahin Pasha at Chernomen and soon the Bulgarian Emperor had to admit the defeat and became a vassal to the invaders. Numerous Bulgarian fortresses in the Rhodope mountains, Sofia valley and eastern Bulgaria were captured one by one over the next twenty years. In 1393 the capital Tarnovo was besieged and seized by the Ottoman Turks and three years later fell Vidin – the last major Bulgarian city. Resistance to the invaders continued until 1422 when the country was fully conquered. The Ottoman invasion was a disaster for the Bulgarian army — the nobility and the leaders of the nation were killed or emigrated and civilians were not allowed to have weapons until the 19th century.

== Tactics ==
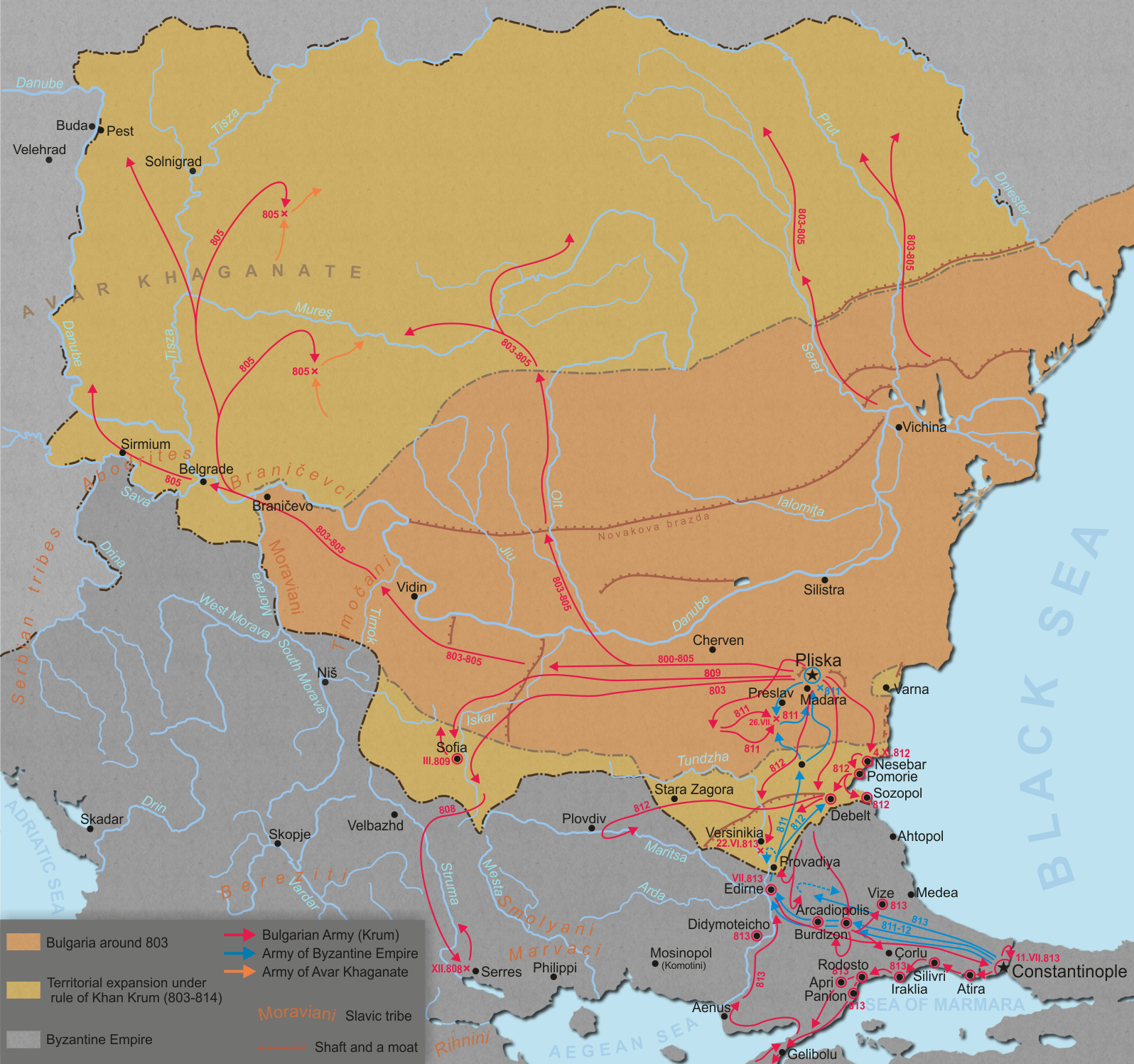
The campaigns of the Bulgarian army in the early 9th century.

The Bulgarian army employed various military tactics. It relied both on the experience of the soldiers and the peculiarities of the terrain. The Balkan Mountains played a significant role in the military history of Bulgaria and facilitated the country's defense against the strong Byzantine army which conveyed the Roman military art in the Middle Ages. Most of the nine campaigns of the ambitious Emperor Constantine V to eliminate the young Bulgarian state, which suffered political crisis, failed in the mountain passes of the Balkan. In 811 the whole Byzantine army was destroyed in the Varbitsa Pass and in 12th–13th centuries several other Byzantine forces shared that doom. The Bulgarians maintained many outposts and castles which guarded the passes and were able to locate an invading force and quickly inform the high command about any enemy moves.

Another widely used tactic was to make a false retreat and then suddenly attack the enemy — breaking the lines when in pursuit. This trick won many victories, most notably at the battle of Adrianople in 1205 against the Crusaders. Sometimes the Bulgarians left a strong cavalry force in reserve which attacked in the sublime moment and tipped the balance in Bulgarians' favour, for instance in the battle of Anchialus in 917. Ambush was another widely used and very successful strategy especially during the Cometopuli dynasty.

Inside the fortress [Sofia] there is a large and elite army, its soldiers are heavily built, moustached and look war-hardened, but are used to consume wine and rakia – in a word, jolly fellows.

— Ottoman commander Lala Shahin on the garrison of Sofia.

The Bulgarians usually avoided frontal assault and waited the enemy to attack first. After the opponent inevitably breaks his battle formation the Bulgarians would counter-attack with their heavy cavalry. In several battles the Bulgarian troops waited the Byzantines for days until the latter attack — for instance at Marcelae (792) or Versinikia (813) – and scored decisive victories. In one of the rare occasions in which the army made a frontal attack on the enemy, the result was a defeat despite the heavy casualties the enemy suffered – battle of Anchialus (763). After a successful battle the Bulgarian would pursue the enemy in depth in order to eliminate as much soldiers as possible and not to allow him to reorganize his forces quickly and effectively. For instance after the victory at Ongal in 680 the Byzantines were chased for 150–200 km. After the success at Anchialus in 917 the Byzantines were not given time to prepare their resistance properly and the result was the annihilation of their last forces in the battle of Katasyrtai.

During war the Bulgarians usually sent light cavalry to devastate the enemy lands on a broad front pillaging villages and small towns, burning the crops and taking people and cattle. During the Second Empire that task was usually assigned to the Cumans. The Bulgarian army was very mobile — for instance prior to the battle of Klokotnitsa for four days it covered a distance three times longer than the Epirote army for a week; in 1332 it covered 230 km for five days.

== Siege equipment ==
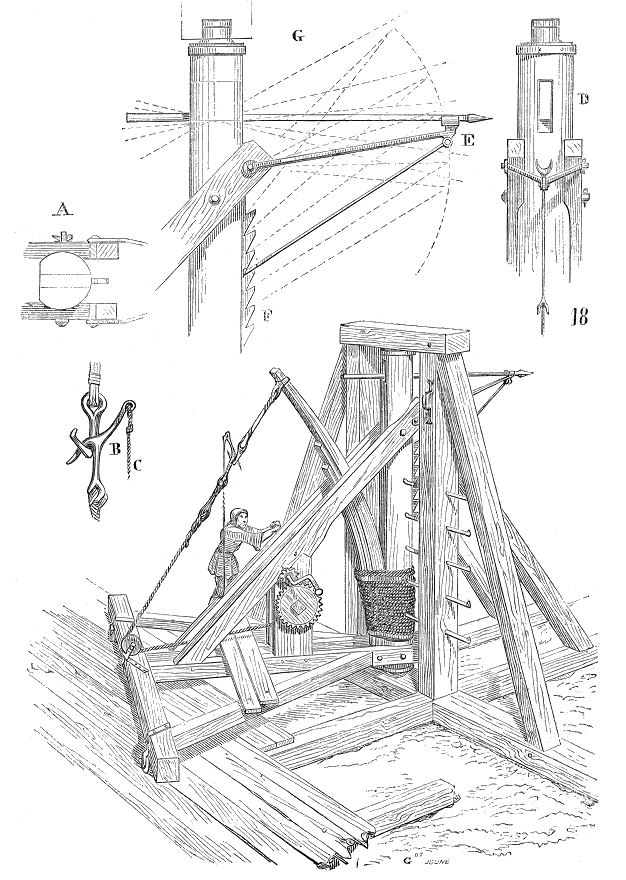
A drawing of a catapult.

The early Bulgarian army was not supplied with strong siege equipment . The Bulgarians used siege machines on a large scale for the first time during the reign of Khan Krum (803–814), when they employed Arab renegades to gain experience. By 814 they possessed a large number of enormous siege machines – battering rams, ballistas, mangonels, catapults, siege towers, machines against battlements. They were transported by 5,000 iron-covered carts, hauled by 10,000 oxen. In addition, after the siege of Mesembria, the Bulgarians captured 36 copper siphons which the Byzantines used to throw the famous Greek fire.

A wide range of siege equipment was also used during the Second Empire. During the siege of Adrianople in 1207, Emperor Kaloyan had 33 catapults and an engineer corps which was tasked with destroying the city walls. In the beginning of the 13th century, during the siege of Varna, the Bulgarians constructed an enormous siege tower which was wider than the moat of the fortress.

== Foreign and mercenary soldiers ==
After the Bulgarians conquered the Avar Khanate in 804–805, Avar soldiers, who were now subjects of the Bulgarian crown, were recruited in the army, especially during the campaign against Nicephorus I in 811, when the Byzantines burned down the capital, Pliska. In the 9th–10th centuries the Bulgarians often resorted to the services of the Pechenegs, who were probably Bulgarian federates. When the Byzantines stirred the Kievan Rus' up against the Empire, the Bulgarian diplomacy in turn used the Pechenegs against Rus'.

During the Second Empire, foreign and mercenary soldiers became an important part of the Bulgarian army and its tactics. Since the very beginning of the rebellion of Asen and Peter, the light and mobile Cuman cavalry was effectively used against the Byzantines and later the Crusaders. For instance, fourteen thousand of them were used by Kaloyan in the battle of Adrianople. The Cumans were the empire's most effective military component. The Cuman leaders entered the ranks of Bulgarian nobility, and some of them received high military or administrative posts in the state. During the 14th century the Bulgarian army increasingly relied on foreign mercenaries, which included Western knights, Mongols, Ossetians or came from vassal Wallachia. Both Michael III Shishman and Ivan Alexander had a 3,000-strong Mongol cavalry detachment in their armies. In the 1350s, Emperor Ivan Alexander even hired Ottoman bands, as did the Byzantine Emperor. Russians were also hired as mercenaries.

== Conflicts ==
=== Byzantine–Bulgarian wars ===
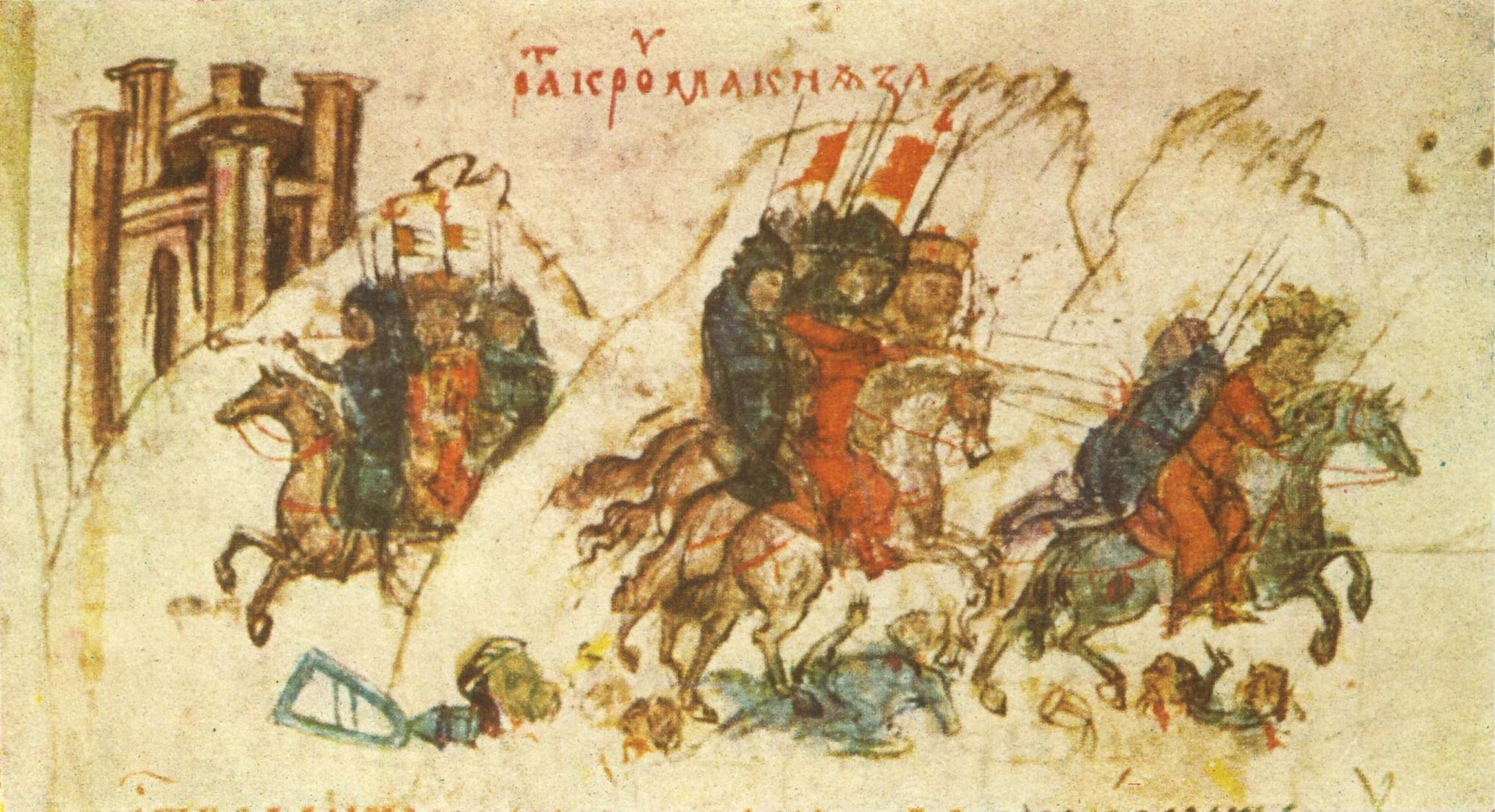
The battle of Pliska, 811.

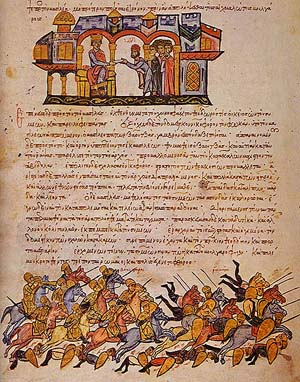
The battle of Bulgarophygon, 896.

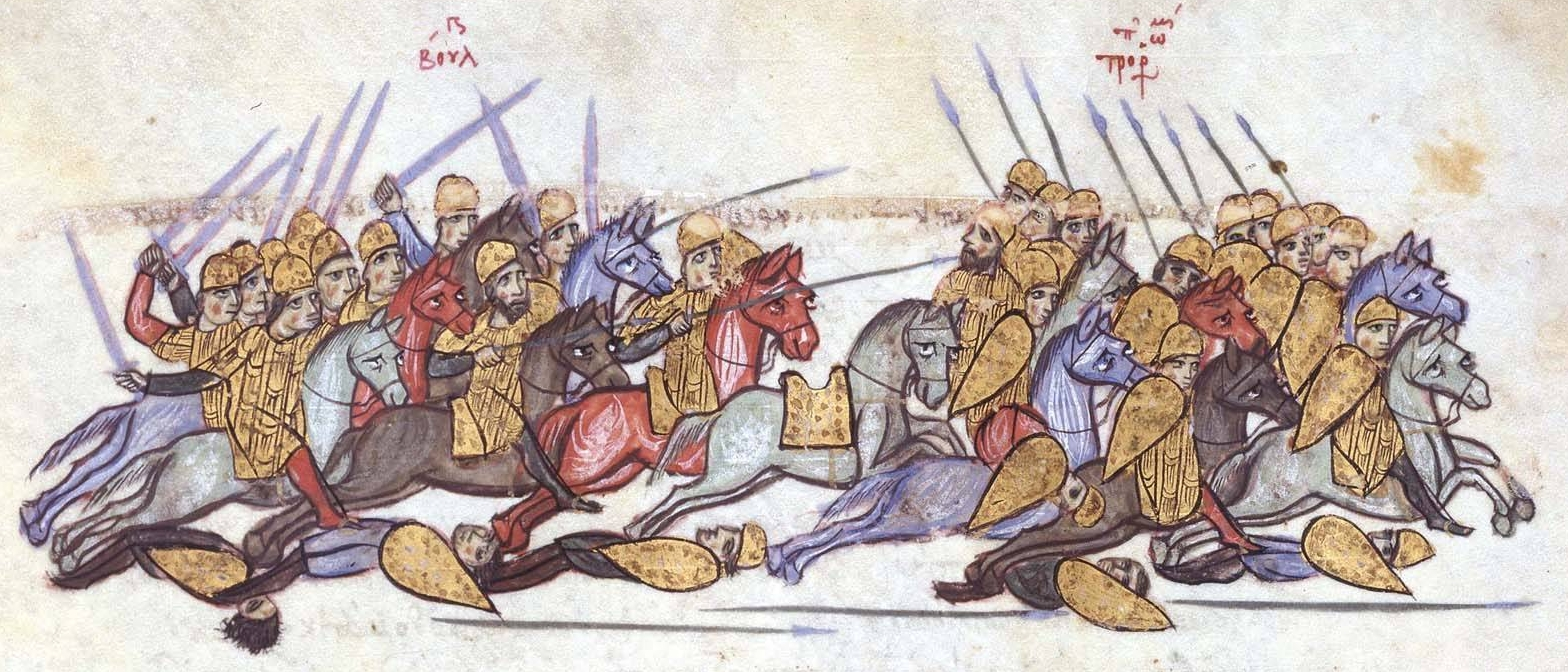
The battle of Anchialus, 917.

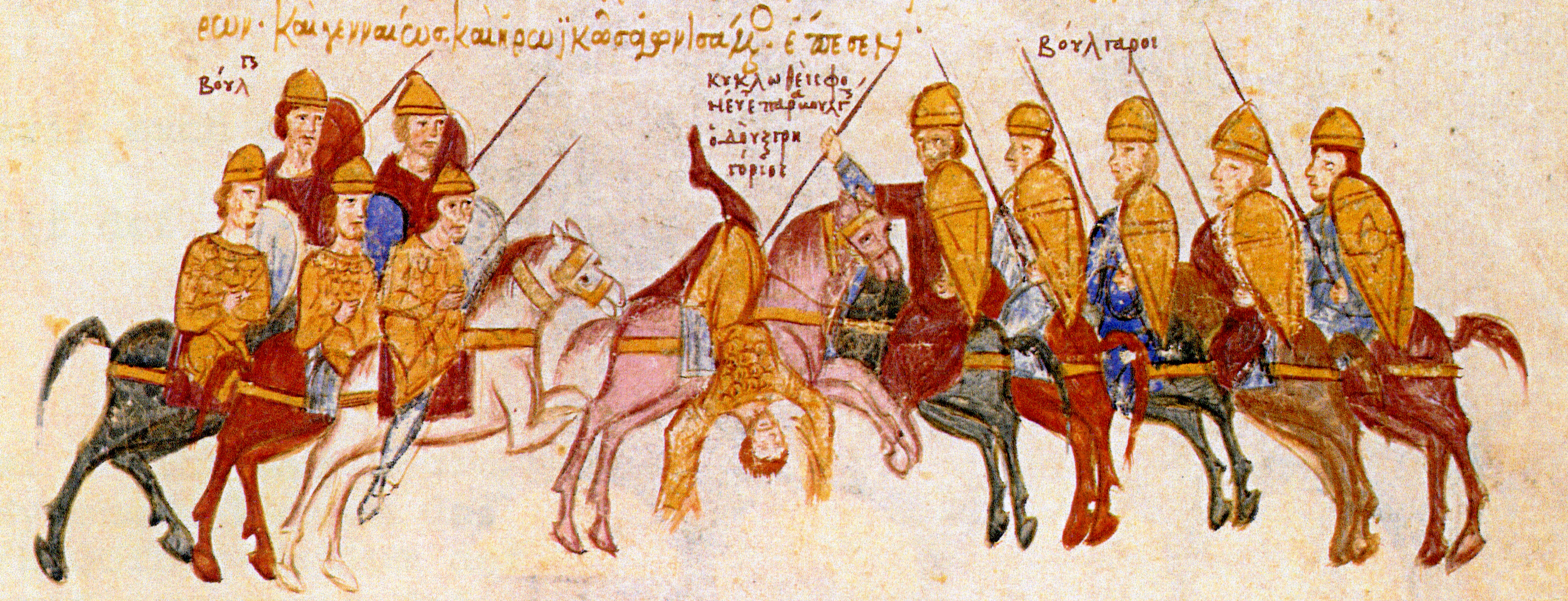
The battle of Salonika, 996.

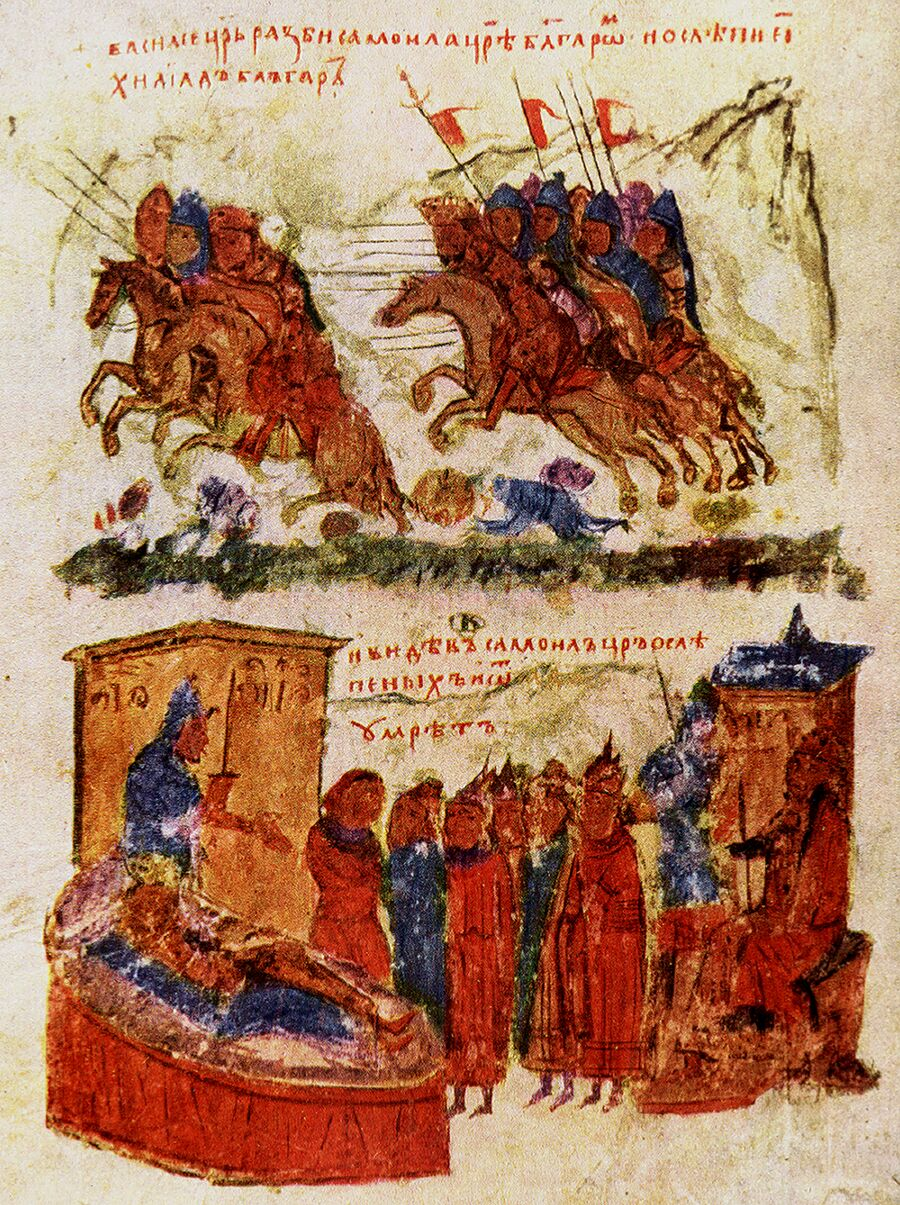
The battle of Kleidion, 1014.

Battle	Date	Bulgarian Commander	Byzantine Commander	Result
Battle of Ongal	680	Asparukh	Constantine IV	Bulgarian victory
Battle of Anchialus	708	Tervel	Justinian II	Bulgarian victory
Battle of Marcellae	756	Vinekh	Constantine V	Byzantine victory
Battle of the Rishki Pass	759	Vinekh	Constantine V	Bulgarian victory
Battle of Anchialus	30 June 763	Telets	Constantine V	Byzantine victory
Battle of Litosoria	October 774	Unknown	Unknown	Byzantine victory
Battle of Marcellae	792	Kardam	Constantine VI	Bulgarian victory
Siege of Serdica	Spring 809	Krum	Unknown	Bulgarian victory
Battle of Pliska	26 July 811	Krum	Nicephorus I	Bulgarian victory
Battle of Versinikia	22 June 813	Krum	Michael I Rangabe	Bulgarian victory
Siege of Adrianople	813	Krum	Unknown	Bulgarian victory
Battle of Boulgarophygon	Summer 896	Simeon I	Unknown	Bulgarian victory
Battle of Achelous	20 August 917	Simeon I	Leo Phokas	Bulgarian victory
Battle of Katasyrtai	August 917	Simeon I	Leo Phokas	Bulgarian victory
Battle of Pegae	March 922	Theodore Sigritsa	Pothos Argyros	Bulgarian victory
Battle of Constantinople (922)	June 922	Simeon I	Saktikios	Bulgarian victory
Battle of the Gates of Trajan	16 July 986	Samuil	Basil II	Bulgarian victory
Battle of Salonica	Summer 996	Samuil	Gregory Taronites	Bulgarian victory
Battle of Spercheios	16 July 996	Samuil	Nikephoros Ouranos	Byzantine victory
Battle of Skopje	1004	Samuil	Basil II	Byzantine victory
Battle of Kreta	1009	Samuil	Basil II	Byzantine victory
Battle of Thessalonica	July 1014	Nestoritsa	Theophylact Botaneiates	Byzantine victory
Battle of Kleidion	29 July 1014	Samuil	Basil II	Byzantine victory
Battle of Strumitsa	August 1014	Gavril Radomir	Theophylact Botaneiates	Bulgarian victory
Battle of Bitola	Autumn 1015	Ivats	George Gonitsiates	Bulgarian victory
Battle of Setina	Autumn 1017	Ivan Vladislav	Basil II	Byzantine victory
Battle of Dyrrhachium	February 1018	Ivan Vladislav	Niketas Pegonites	Byzantine victory
Battle of Thessalonica	1040	Peter II Delyan	Michael IV	Bulgarian victory
Battle of Thessalonica	Autumn 1040	Alusian	Unknown	Byzantine victory
Battle of Ostrovo	1041	Peter II Delyan	Michael IV	Byzantine victory
Siege of Lovech	Spring 1190	Unknown	Isaac II Angelos	Bulgarian victory
Battle of Tryavna	Spring 1190	Ivan Asen I	Isaac II Angelos	Bulgarian victory
Battle of Arcadiopolis	1194	Ivan Asen I	Basil Vatatzes	Bulgarian victory
Battle of Serres	1196	Ivan Asen I	Isaac	Bulgarian victory
Siege of Varna	21–24 March 1201	Kaloyan	Unknown	Bulgarian victory
Battle of Klokotnitsa	9 March 1230	Ivan Asen II	Theodore Komnenos	Bulgarian victory
Battle of Adrianople	1254	Unknown	Unknown	Byzantine victory
Battle of Devina	17 July 1279	Ivaylo	Murin	Bulgarian victory
Battle of Skafida	1304	Theodore Svetoslav	Michael IX	Bulgarian victory
Battle of Rusokastro	18 July 1332	Ivan Alexander	Andronikos III	Bulgarian victory

=== Bulgarian–Croatian wars ===
Battle	Date	Bulgarian Commander	Croatian Commander	Result
Croatian–Bulgarian War (854)	854	Boris I	Trpimir I	Alliance
Battle of the Bosnian Highlands	27 May 926	Alogobotur	Tomislav	Croatian victory
Croatian Civil War (1000)	1000	Samuel	Svetoslav Suronja	Bulgarian victory

=== Bulgarian–Hungarian wars ===
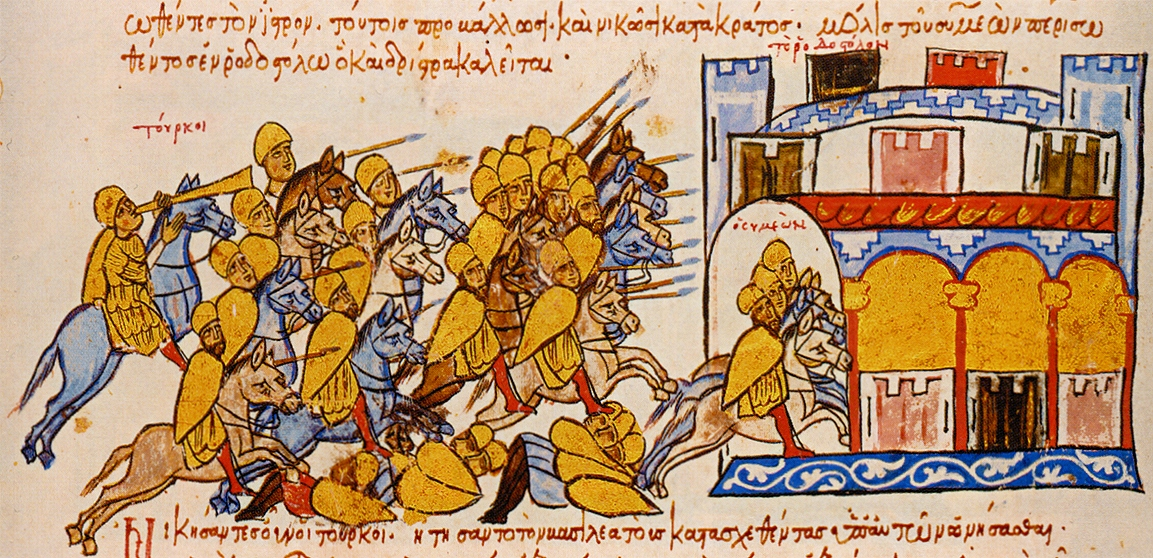
The Bulgarian army flees to Silistra after a defeat by the Hungarians in 895.

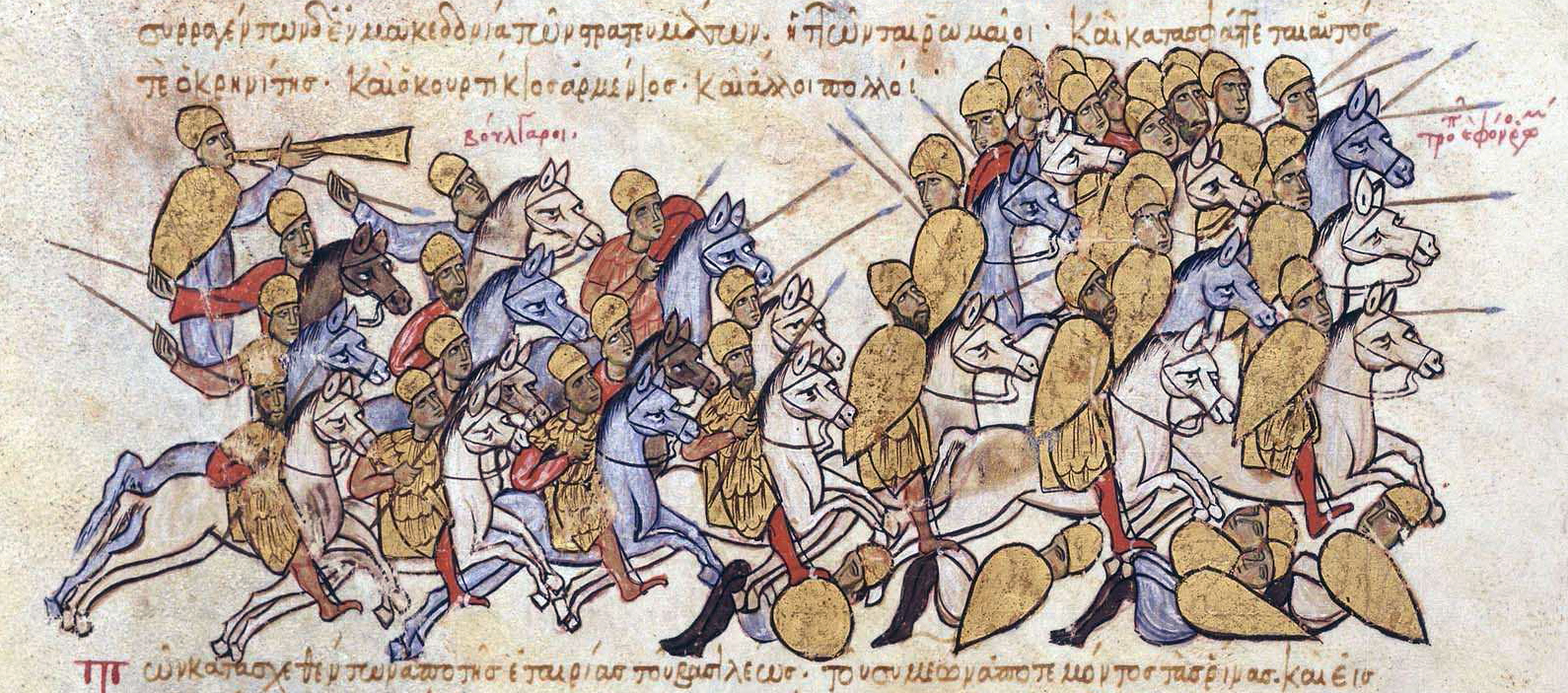
A battle between Bulgarians and Hungarians.

Battle	Date	Bulgarian Commander	Hungarian Commander	Result
Battle of Southern Buh	896	Simeon I	Unknown	Bulgarian victory

=== Bulgarian–Latin wars ===
Battle	Date	Bulgarian Commander	Latin Commander	Result
Battle of Adrianople	14 April 1205	Kaloyan	Baldwin I	Bulgarian victory
Battle of Serres	June 1205	Kaloyan	Unknown	Bulgarian victory
Battle of Rusion	31 January 1206	Kaloyan	Thierry de Termond	Bulgarian victory
Battle of Rodosto	February 1206	Kaloyan	Unknown	Bulgarian victory
Battle of Messinopolis	4 September 1207	Unknown	Boniface of Montferrat	Bulgarian victory
Battle of Beroia	June 1205	Boril	Henry I	Bulgarian victory
Battle of Philippopolis	31 June 1208	Boril	Henry I	Latin victory
Siege of Constantinople	1235	Ivan Asen II	John of Brienne	Bulgarian victory

=== Bulgarian–Ottoman wars ===
Battle	Date	Bulgarian Commander	Ottoman Commander	Result
Battle of Ihtiman	1355	Michael Asen	Unknown	Bulgarian victory
Siege of Tarnovo	17 July 1393	Evtimiy	Chelebi	Ottoman victory

=== Bulgarian–Serbian wars ===
Battle 1	Date	Bulgarian Commander	Serbian Commander	Result
Bulgarian–Serbian War (839–842)	839–42	Presian	Vlastimir	Serbian victory
Bulgarian–Serbian War (853)	853	Vladimir-Rasate	Mutimir	Serbian victory
Bulgarian–Serbian wars of 917–924	917–924	Simeon I	Petar	Bulgarian victory
Bulgarian–Serbian War (998)	998	Samuel	Jovan Vladimir	Bulgarian victory
Bulgarian–Serbian War (1202–1203)	1202–1203	Kaloyan	Emeric	Bulgarian victory
Battle of Velbazhd	28 July 1330	Michael Shishman	Stefan Dečanski	Serbian victory

== See also ==
- Medieval Bulgarian navy
- Byzantine army
- Medieval warfare

== Notes ==
- Note that the works Byzantine authors are usually from their Bulgarian edition ГИБИ (Гръцки Извори за Българската История – Greek Sources for the Bulgarian History)
