= Siege of Constantinople (1235–1236) =

Siege by a Bulgarian-Nicaean alliance

Coordinates: 41.0083°N 28.9750°E

- Part of the Struggle for Constantinople
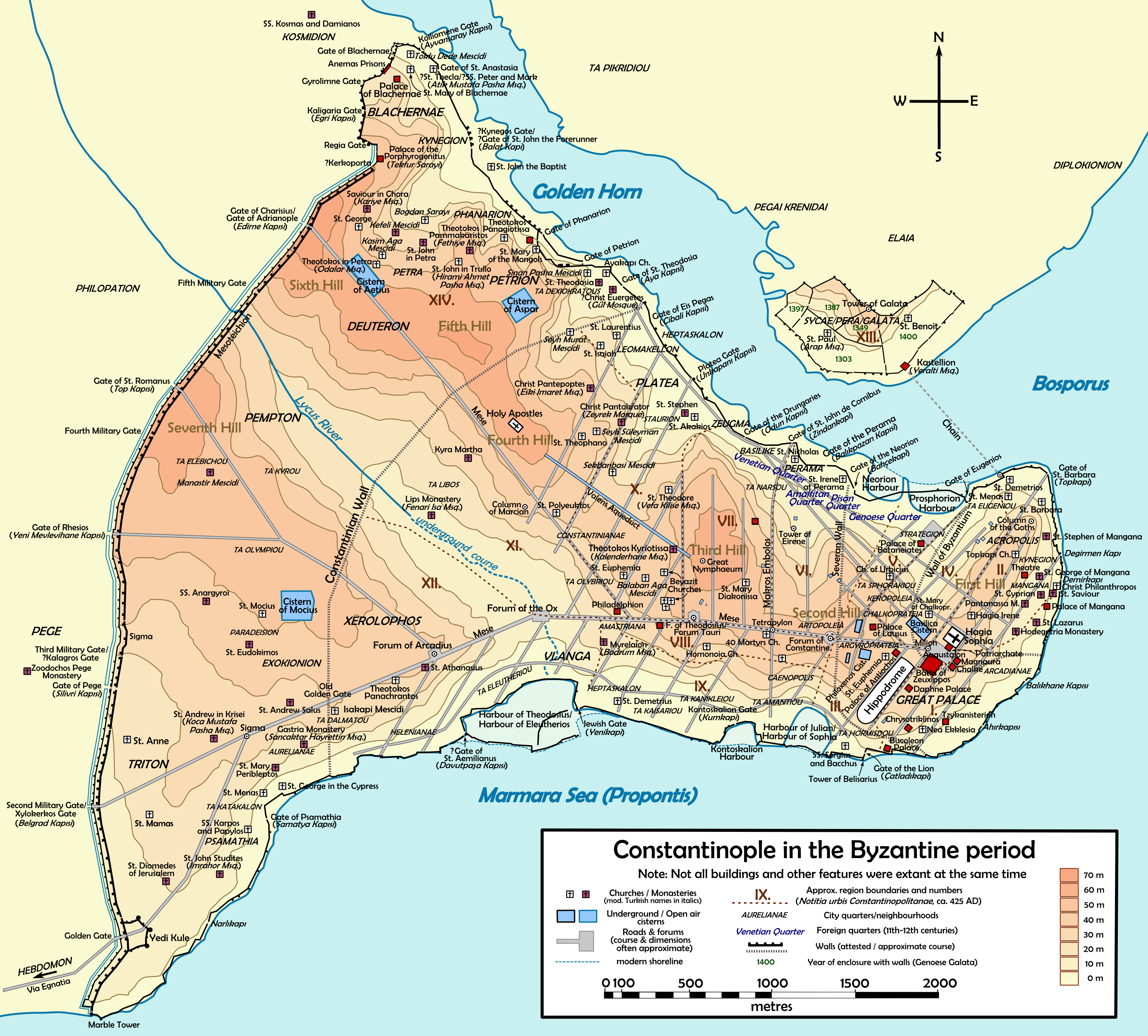
- Map showing Constantinople and its walls during the Byzantine era
| Date | 1235–1236 |
| Location | Constantinople, Latin Empire; (now Istanbul, Turkey) |
| Result | Latin victory |

Belligerents
| Empire of Nicaea; Bulgarian Empire | Latin Empire; Republic of Venice; Kingdom of Morea (Note: Participated in the second phase of the siege.); Republic of Genoa; Republic of Pisa |

Commanders and leaders
| John III Doukas Vatatzes; Ivan Asen II; Manuel Doukas; Michael II Komnenos Doukas | John of Brienne; Angelo Sanudo; Geoffrey II of Villehardouin; John of Béthune |

Strength
| 48 acies (Note: "Acies" correspond to an army unit, but the exact number is unknown. Historian John Langdon considered a 50,000-strong allied army, as reported by one of the primary sources, as an exaggeration, but reflected the commitment of Vatatzes to the success of the siege.); 100 Nicaean galleys | 160–800 knights (Note: There no agreement among the primary sources in the size of the defending army. A papal letter of Gregory IX states that 160 knights mainly compiled the defense of Constantinople, while Philippe Mouskes, recounting that French and Flemish soldiers defended the city against "hundreds and thousands" of attackers, accounted that the defending force under John of Brianne was 800 knights, supported by their squires.); 25 Venetian galleys; Reinforcements |

The siege of Constantinople took place between 1235 and late 1236 when a joint Bulgarian–Nicaean army led by Tsar Ivan Asen II of Bulgaria and Emperor of Nicaea John III Doukas Vatatzes conducted an unsuccessful siege of the capital of the Latin Empire.

The siege arose from the prolonged conflict between the Latin Empire, Bulgaria and the Byzantine successor states, the Empire of Nicaea and Despotate of Epirus, following the capture and sack of Constantinople by the Fourth Crusade in 1204. Each aimed to revive or establish an empire in the territories of the Byzantine Empire. Initially, Asen was led by the Latins to believe he would become emperor of Constantinople following the death of Robert of Courtenay in 1228. The Latins terminated negotiations after the Bulgarians defeated Epirus at the Battle of Klokotnitsa in 1230, as the Latins sought only to prevent an alliance between Bulgaria and Epirus. The announcement that John of Brienne had become the new Latin emperor angered Asen. He initiated negotiations and eventually agreed to a formal alliance with Vatatzes in early 1235 to combine their forces to reclaim Constantinople. Ecclesiastical concessions and a dynastic marriage sealed the alliance.

Despite their combined strength against a small garrison, the siege failed to breach the Constantinopolitan walls supported by the Venetian navy. The allied army withdrew in the autumn for the winter and renewed the siege in 1236. Later that year, Asen shifted allegiance, presumably to avoid calls for a crusade from the pope or to capture the city, before abandoning the Latin Empire a year later and refraining from more campaigns. While the siege did not topple the Latin Empire, it increased pressure against Latin rule and foreshadowed the eventual Byzantine recovery of Constantinople in 1261 by the Nicaean forces.

== Background ==
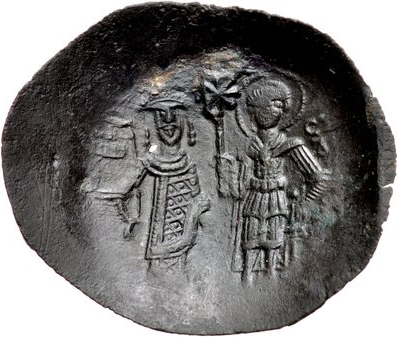
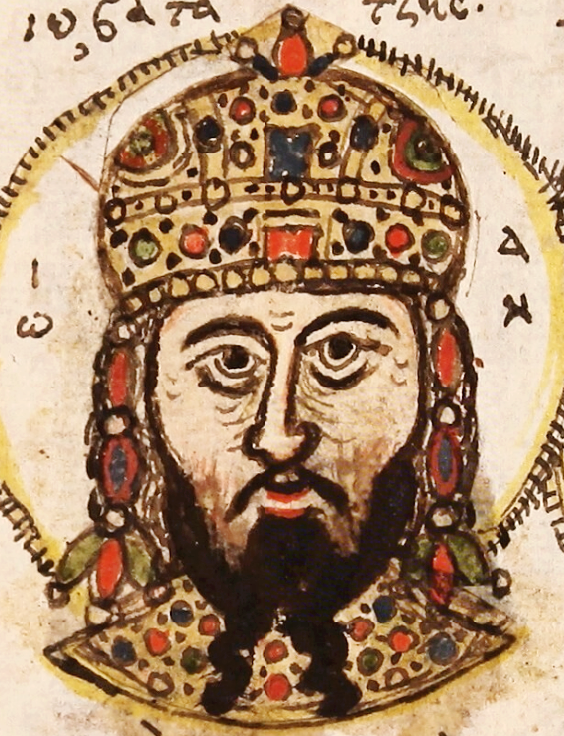
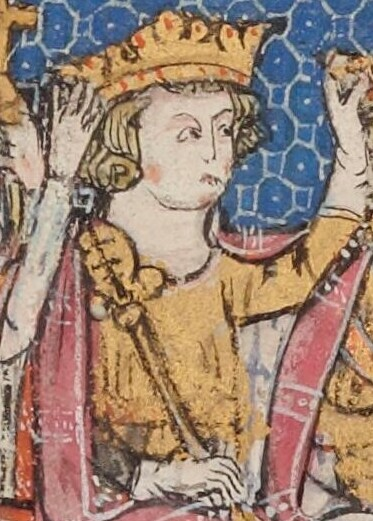
(Left) Coin depicting Tsar Ivan Asen II, (middle) a portrait of Nicaen Emperor John III Doukas Vatatzes, and (right) a portrait of Emperor John of Brienne, oil on canvas, by François-Édouard Picot, 1845

The Fourth Crusade led to the partition of the Byzantine Empire among the crusaders. Starting in 1204, the new Latin Empire struggled to consolidate its power, as its authority was immediately challenged by Byzantine rump states (Empire of Nicaea and Despotate of Epirus). In the north, Bulgarians gathered an army aimed to control parts of Macedonia and Thrace, regions claimed by the Latin Empire.

The struggle for control of Macedonia and Thrace between the regional powers, often forming and breaking agreements between them, led to considerable destruction to the cities of northern Greece, such as Serres and Philippopolis, and the displaced population sought refuge in fortified cities. A key city for the conquest of Constantinople was Thessalonica, that had been under the control of Theodore Doukas, ruler of Epirus, since 1224. The Epirote defeat, including the capture of Theodore Doukas, by the Bulgarians at the Battle of Klokotnitsa (1230) ended Epirote aspirations.

The Latins had been negotiating with Asen, who was under the impression that he could become Emperor of Constantinople, aimed at avoiding an Asen–Theodore Doukas alliance. Concurrently, the Latin barons and papacy at Perugia offered the throne of Constantinople to John of Brienne after the death of Robert of Courtenay in 1228, but this agreement was kept secret from non-Latin actors. John accepted this offer in 1229, and he arrived at Constantinople in 1231 for the coronation. The Latins broke negotiations with Asen once Epirus was defeated by the Bulgarians in 1230. Asen was upset by this news and renewed the communication with Nicaea for an alliance against the Latin Empire.

== Alliance ==
In the spring of 1235, John III Doukas Vatatzes crossed the Dardanelles and took over Gallipoli. Asen, along with his family, arrived there to meet with Vatatzes and his court, where they concluded an alliance for a joint campaign against the Latin Empire. Part of the agreement for the alliance was the recognition of the Bulgarian Church's autocephaly by the Nicaean church, granting the title of Patriarch of Bulgaria to the archbishop of Tărnovo. In return, the Nicaean patriarch was recognized by Asen as ecumenical and he gave up his claims over Mount Athos, along with ecclesiastical authority in the areas of eastern Thrace and Thessaloniki. The alliance was sealed with the marriage between Asen's daughter, Elena, and the Nicean heir, Theodore. The joint campaign started in the summer of the same year after the marriage.

== Siege ==
Schematic of the Theodosian walls, showing the three parts of the wall: a broad moat, a short first wall and a larger wall behind it

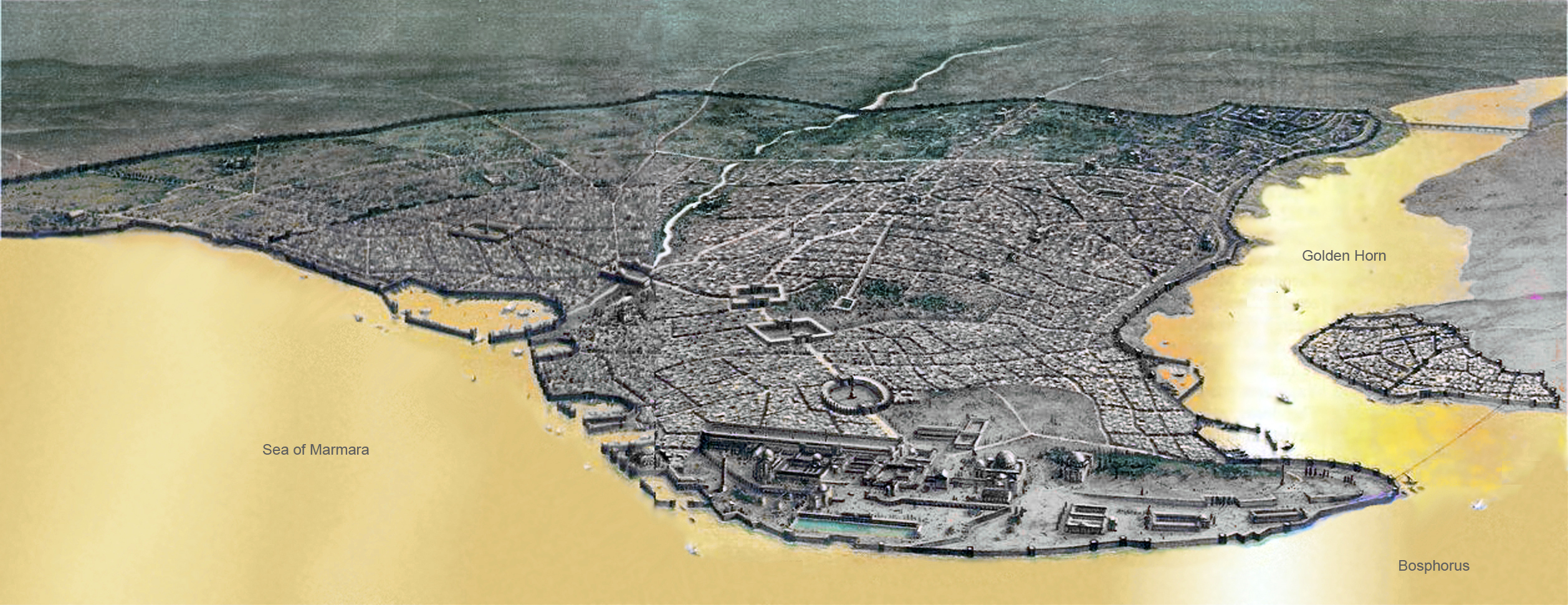
The first bridge on the Horn, built by Byzantine Emperor Justinian the Great, can be seen near the Theodosian Walls at the western end of the city (see upper right) in this rendering of old Constantinople.

The Nicaean army moved from Gallipoli north, seizing territories from the Latin Empire in Thrace from the east coast up to the mouth of the Marica, including the fortress of Tzurulum to the west of Constantinople. Having secured the surrounding territory, the two armies joined forces to lay siege to Constantinople. The Latins had at their command a small garrison, which included 160–800 knights. The Latins distrusted the Greeks living within the city and disarmed them. To avoid any uprising by the Greek population, they claimed that the Nicaean ships carried Turkish mercenaries whose purpose was to burn Constantinople.

Asen and Vatatzes participated in the combat. The defenders were able to repel the besieging forces. On land, John of Brienne used his knights to charge against the army of Asen–Vatatzes outside the walls of the city, causing casualties and confusion to the allied army. The Nicaean fleet tried to penetrate the defenses of the Golden Horn but it was initially repelled by the defenders. Upon the arrival of a naval squadron (25 armed galleys) from the Republic of Venice for the defense of Constantinople, the Venetians pursued the retreating Nicaean ships and they were able to capture 24 of them. The joint Bulgarian–Nicaean siege failed and they retreated in the autumn due to the incoming winter. Asen and Vatatzes agreed to continue the siege in the following year and after the departure of the Venetian fleet.

The second part of the siege, lasting into the spring of 1236, brought no significant progress. The defenders received assistance from Geoffrey II Villehardouin of Morea and the Italian republics (Venice, Genoa and Pisa). The historian, John Langdon, argued that Asen and Vatatzes met in Thrace to organize the disposition of forces and reinforce any Thracian holdings to prevent further reinforcements from arriving at Constantinople, after which they departed to their courts.

== Aftermath ==
=== Bulgarian reversals ===
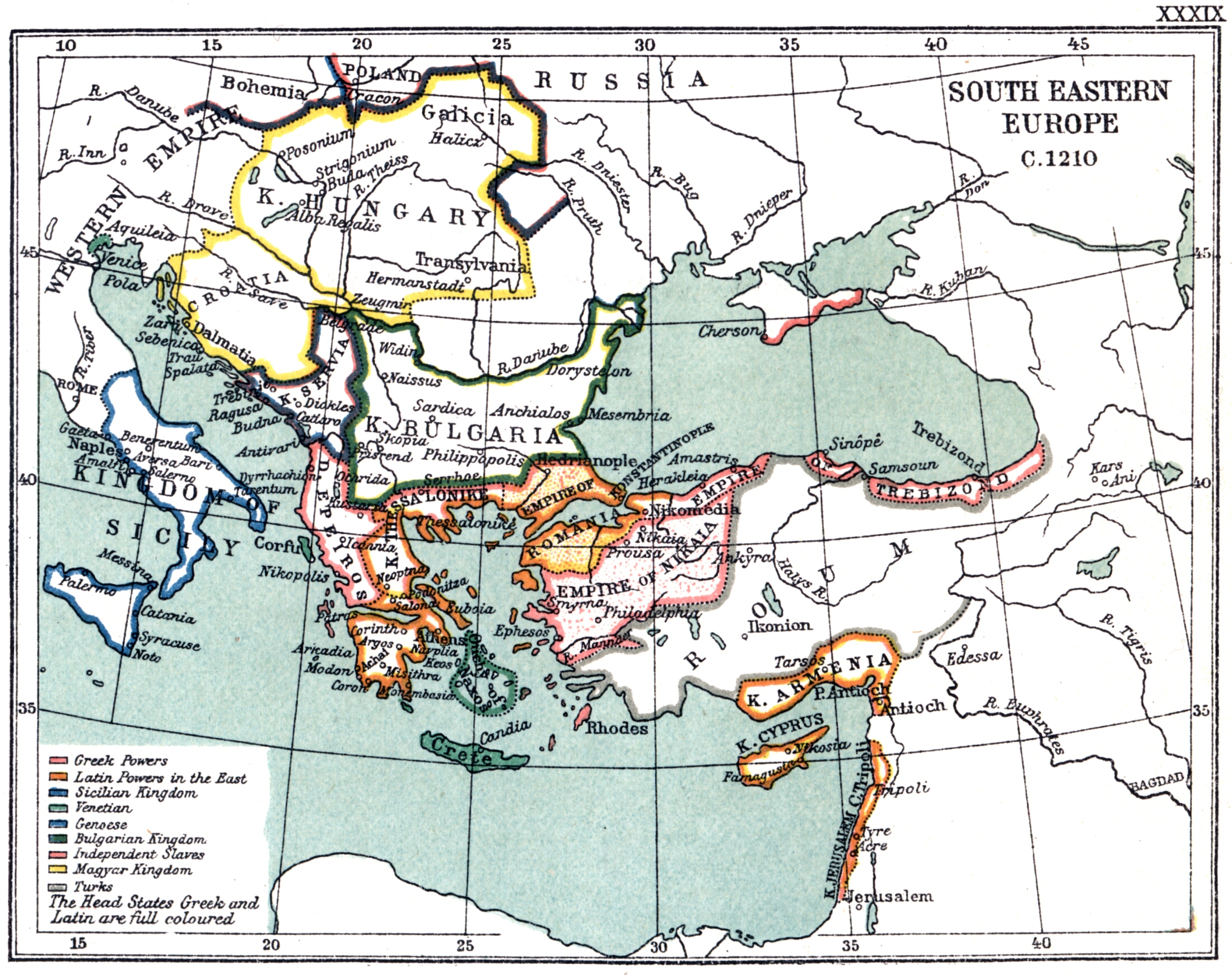
Political map of southeastern Europe c. 1210

The alliance between Asen and Vatatzes was short-lived, and Asen allied with the Latin Empire. Asen's army, reinforced by Cumans displaced from the Steppe by the Mongols attacked the Nicaean possessions, including the fortress of Tzurulum. Scholars have presented two plausible explanations for this action. He may have reconsidered the agreement upon realizing that Nicaea stood to gain the most. If Constantinople had been captured, it would have become the center of a Greek Empire, preventing its capture by the Bulgarians. At the same time, Pope Gregory IX increased calls for a crusade against him, particularly urging Hungary to attack from the north, because Asen refused to accept union with the Church of Rome and instead allied with schismatic opponents against Catholic-held territories. Asen averted this threat through diplomatic overtures to Hungary and Constantinople and by refraining from further attacks.

Asen broke his alliance with the Latin Empire by the end of 1237 and made a treaty with Vatatzes. According to the contemporary historian, George Akropolites, this reversal was prompted by the sudden death of his wife and one of his children from plague, which was interpreted as divine punishment for breaking his previous alliance. In the years that followed, Asen consolidated Bulgaria's defenses and improved relations with Hungary. The kingdom faced threats from a potential crusade, and from the Mongols and Tatars, who had destroyed the Cuman state in the northeast. This new danger imperiled Bulgaria and Hungary, halting potential expansions to the south.

=== Latin Empire ===
After the dissolution of the besieging army, some of John of Brienne's soldiers left his service because they were not paid, further weakening the defenses of the city. In 1237, the emperor recruited Western knights for the defense of the city in his trip west with the help of the pope. Two years later, more knights (estimated 30,000 to 60,000 in number) were mobilized. They crossed Hungary and Bulgaria, where Asen, not wanting to fight them, gave them free passage. They captured the Nicaean fortress of Tzurulum before dispersing, many returning home and others joining in the defense of Constantinople. The sporadic reinforcements were insufficient to counter the pressure from Nicaean and Bulgarian campaigns. The capital of the Latin Empire was spared only because of the divisions among its enemies.

=== Nicaean actions ===
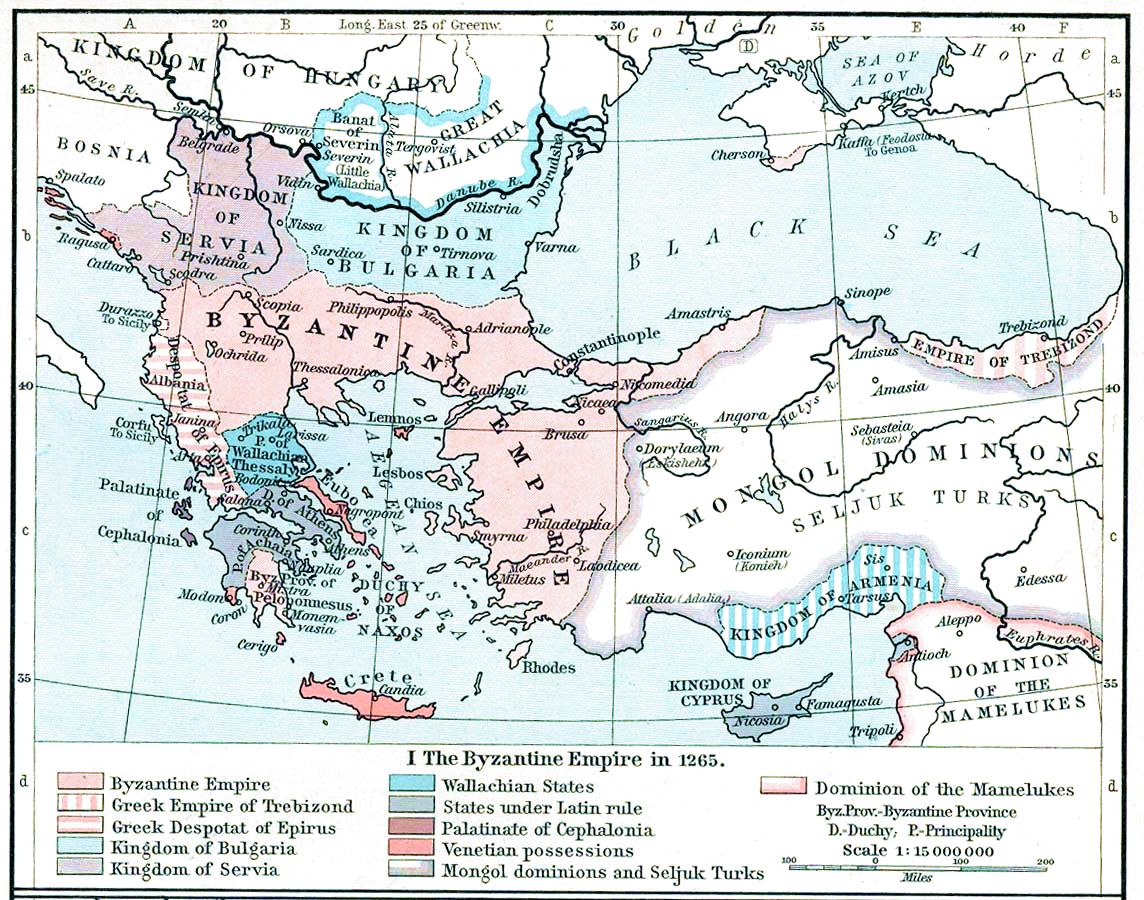
The restored Byzantine Empire in 1265 (William R. Shepherd, Historical Atlas, 1911)

Vatatzes expanded his holdings in Thrace during the campaign and a year after Asen's death in 1241, he was able to secure Thessalonica, isolating Constantinople. At the same time, Vatatzes had to return to defend his homeland in Anatolia against a possible Mongol invasion. Nicaea was spared, because the Mongols retreated following the sudden death of the Great Khan in Karakorum. It was a boon for Nicaea because the Mongols had inflicted significant damage to the Sultanate of Rum, leaving Nicaea in a stronger position to claim Constantinople. In 1258, the Battle of Pelagonia signaled the beginning of the end of Latin predominance in Greece. On 25 July 1261, with most of the Latin troops away on campaign, the Nicaean general Alexios Strategopoulos found an unguarded entrance to the city, and entered it with his troops, restoring the Byzantine Empire under Michael VIII Palaiologos.
