= Battle of Kreta =

- Part of the Byzantine–Bulgarian wars
Date	1009
Location	east of Thessaloníki, Greece
Result	Byzantine victory

Belligerents
Bulgarian Empire	Byzantine Empire

Commanders and leaders
Samuel of Bulgaria	Basil II

Strength
Unknown	Unknown

Casualties and losses
Unknown	Unknown

The Battle of Kreta occurred in 1009 near the village of Kreta to the east of Thessaloníki. Since the fall of the Bulgarian capital Preslav to the Byzantines in 971, there was a constant state of war between the two Empires. From 976, the Bulgarian noble and later Emperor Samuel successfully fought against the Byzantines but, from the beginning of the 11th century, fortune favoured Byzantium, which recovered from previous severe losses. From 1002 Basil II launched annual campaigns against Bulgaria and seized many towns. In 1009 the Byzantines engaged the Bulgarian army to the east of Thessaloníki. Little is known for the battle itself but the result was a Byzantine victory. Five years later, the Byzantines decisively defeated the Bulgarian army at Kleidion and by 1018 the country was thoroughly conquered by Basil II.

== Bibliography ==
- Gyuzelev, Vasil, Bulgaria from the second quarter of the 10th century to the beginning of the 11th century, (Balgaria ot vtorata chetvart na X do nachaloto na XI vek, България от втората четвърт на Х до началото на ХІ век), in Bulgarian, In: Dimitrov, Ilcho (Ed.), Short History of Bulgaria (Kratka istoria na Balgaria, Кратка история на България), in Bulgarian, Science and Arts Publishers, Sofia 1983
- Nikolov, Georgi (2005). Centralism and regionalism in early Medieval Bulgaria (end of the 7th – beginning of the 11th centuries) Tsentralizam i regionalizam v rannosrednowekovna Balgariya (kraya na VII — nachaloto na XI vek), Централизъм и регионализъм в ранносредновековна България (края на VII — началото на XI век) (in Bulgarian). Sofia: Academic Press Marin Drinov. ISBN 954-430-787-7.
