= Bulgarian–Latin wars =

1204–1261 wars in the Balkans during the Crusades

Bulgarian-Latin wars
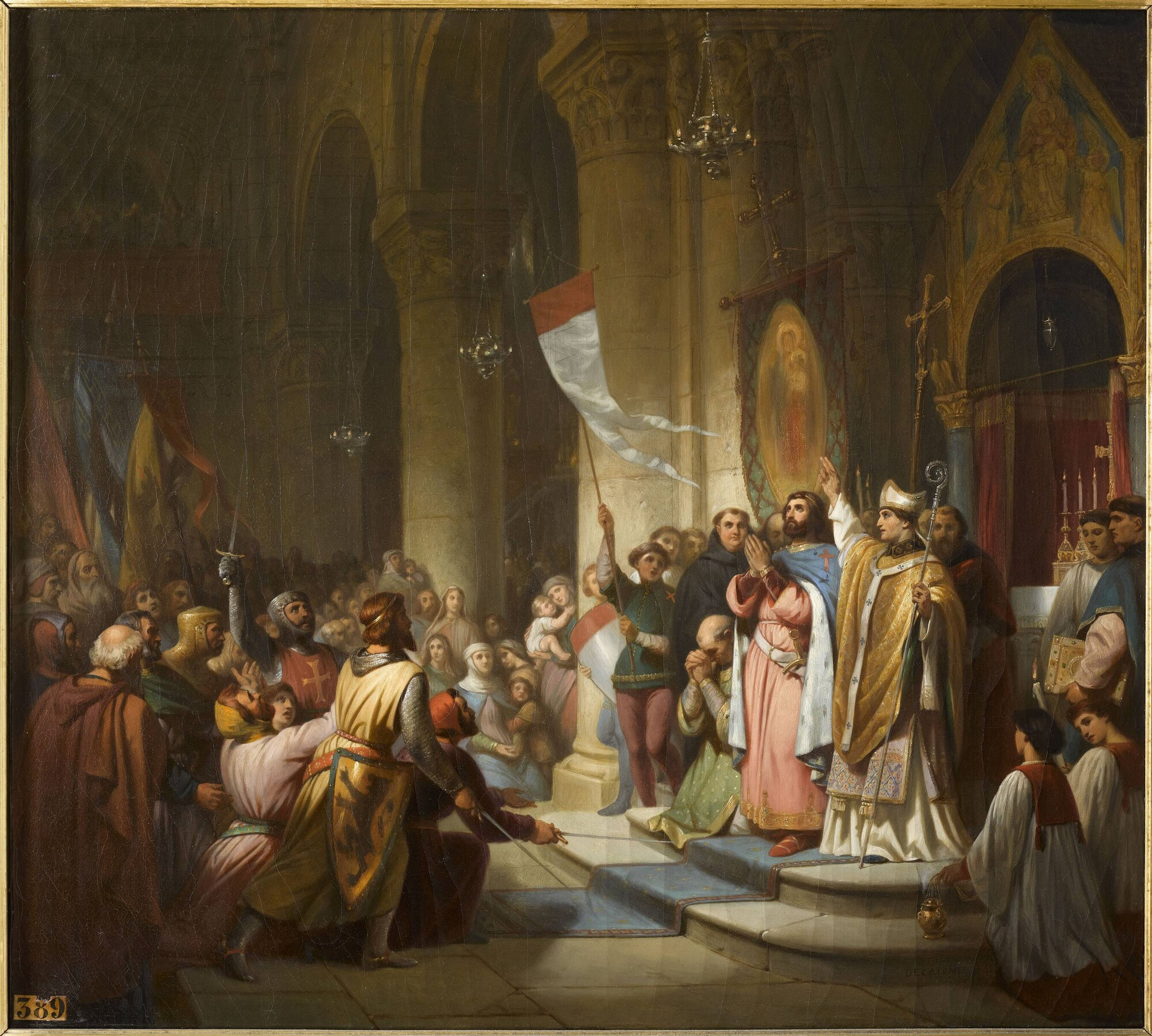
- Boniface of Montferrat elected leader of the Fourth Crusade and eventual king of Thessalonica before his death by the Bulgarian King Kaloyan
Date	1204–1261 AD (57 Years)
Location	Balkan and Anatolian Peninsulas
Result	Bulgarian victory: The Fourth Crusade lost most of its leaders; The Latin Empire was severely weakened, eventually leading to its demise
Territorial changes	Weakening of the Latin Empire and enlargement of the Bulgarian Empire

Belligerents
Bulgarian Empire	Latin Empire; Allies: Duchy of Athens; Duchy of Archipelago; Principality of Achaea; Despotate of Epirus; Republic of Venice; Republic of Genoa; Empire of Nicaea Empire of Thessalonica

Commanders and leaders
Kaloyan; Boril; Ivan Asen II	Baldwin I †; Henry of Flanders; Boniface I of Montferrat †

The Bulgarian–Latin wars were a series of conflicts between the Second Bulgarian Empire (1185–1396) and the Latin Empire (1204–61). The wars affected the northern border of the Latin Empire throughout its existence.

The initial expansionist ambitions of the Latin Empire were crushed only one year after its foundation after the Battle of Adrianople in 1205, where its Emperor Baldwin I was captured and most of his knights perished. After that crucial defeat the Latin Empire had to defend itself against Bulgaria and the successor states of the Byzantine Empire, the Nicaean Empire in Asia Minor and the Despotate of Epirus in the Balkans.

As a result of the conflicts the Bulgarian Empire expanded its territory taking control of most of the Balkan Peninsula while the influence of the Latin Empire was reduced to Constantinople and a few towns and islands. With the elimination of the Patriarchate of Constantinople by the Roman Catholic Crusaders, Bulgaria became the centre of Orthodox Christianity.

== Foundation of the Latin Empire ==
On 13 April 1204 the knights of the Fourth Crusade seized the capital of the Byzantine Empire (Eastern Roman Empire), Constantinople, and replaced the ancient Byzantine Empire with a new Crusader state, the Latin Empire. Their leader Count Baldwin of Flanders was crowned Emperor in the Hagia Sophia as Baldwin I. According to the Partitio Romaniae he received a quarter of the Empire and the rest was divided between the Venetians and the Crusaders. The Emperor received the lands in Asia Minor as well as Constantinople and a thin strip along the Black Sea coast and a few other towns in the Balkans. The Venetians took the most fertile part of Byzantine Thrace including Adrianople (Odrin), Rodosto, Arkadiopolis, most of the Peloponnese, parts of Epirus and Thessaly as well as many islands. Their Doge took the title quartae partis et dimidiae totius imperii Romaniae dominator or "Lord of a quarter and a half part of the whole Roman Empire". The Crusaders received the other lands of the former Byzantine Empire and created the Kingdom of Thessalonica with Boniface of Montferrat selected for King.

== Bulgarian intervention ==
In 1204, the Fourth Crusade captured Constantinople, capital of the Byzantine Empire, and created the Latin Empire, electing as emperor Baldwin I of Flanders. Although the Bulgarians had offered the crusaders an alliance against the Byzantine Empire, their offer had been spurned, and the Latin Empire expressed the intention of conquering all the lands of the former Byzantine Empire, including the territories ruled by Kaloyan, the Bulgarian emperor. The impending conflict was precipitated by the Byzantine aristocracy in Thrace, which rebelled against Latin rule in 1205 and called on Bulgarians for help, offering the Bulgarians its submission.

== Kaloyan's Thrace campaign ==
As the Latin Emperor Baldwin I began to subdue rebel cities and besieged Adrianople, in the words of the Crusader chronicler Villehardouin, "Johannizza, King of Wallachia, was coming to succour Adrianople with a very great host; for he brought with him Wallachians and Bulgarians, and full fourteen thousand Comans who had never been baptised" (Villehardouin, 92). On April 14, 1205, the Cumans (allied to Kaloyan) managed to draw the pursuing heavy cavalry of the Latin Empire into an ambush in the marshes north of Adrianople, and the Cumans and Bulgarians inflicted a crushing defeat on the crusader army. Emperor Baldwin I was captured, Count Louis I of Blois was killed, and the Venetian Doge Enrico Dandolo led the surviving portions of the crusader army into a hasty retreat back to Constantinople, during the course of which he died of exhaustion. (Baldwin was imprisoned in the Bulgarian capital Tărnovo until he died or was executed later in 1205.) During the course of 1205, Kaloyan captured Serres and Philippopolis (Plovdiv), overrunning much of the territory of the Latin Empire in Thrace and Macedonia. However, the progress of the Bulgarians eventually was interrupted by the assassination of their emperor Kaloyan.

On January 31, 1206, the Bulgarians defeated the Latins again in Thrace, and later proceeded to capture Didymoteikhon. They ravaged Thrace including the important cities of Herakleia and Tzouroulos, and prompting the evacuation of other cities, such as Rodosto (Tekirdağ). Whereas in the past the Bulgarian emperor, Kaloyan, had limited his oppression to the aristocracy, his later campaigns included wholesale transfer of populations from the captured cities to distant regions in Bulgaria.

The Bulgarians besieged Adrianople twice, but failed to take the city because of the withdrawal of their Cuman cavalry, and the determined advance of the new Latin emperor, Baldwin I's brother Henry of Flanders. In 1207 the Bulgarians concluded an anti-Latin alliance with Theodore I Laskaris of the Empire of Nicaea. In the same year, the Bulgarians killed Boniface of Montferrat (September 4, 1207), the Latin ruler of the Kingdom of Thessalonica. Seeking to take advantage of that situation, Kaloyan advanced on the city and besieged it with a large force, but was murdered by his own Cuman commander Manastăr at the beginning of October 1207. In keeping with tradition, the Greek citizens of Thessalonica attributed the slaying of Kaloyan to their patron, Saint Demetrios.

== Peace ==
Kaloyan's successor Boril, his nephew, was not nearly as successful against the Latins. His policy against the Latin empire in Thrace continued with varying success. In 1208 Boril achieved a victory against the Latins in the battle of Beroia but was defeated by Henry of Flanders in the following engagement near Plovdiv the same year. Despite the defeat, Boril managed to retain his main forces and continued to campaign against the Latins, reaching in some daring actions the vicinity of Constantinople, a clear evidence of the positions he had regained in the Balkans. In 1210 a peace was concluded, when the Hungarians and Latin empire made an alliance.

== Fall of the Latin Empire ==
By 1231 the Latin regency had finalized negotiations with John of Brienne, the former king of Jerusalem, who was invited to step in as the guardian and co-emperor of Baldwin II at Constantinople. This action led to the breach of the alliance between Bulgaria and the Latin Empire, and the creation of an alternate alliance between Bulgaria and Empire of Nicaea. However, the Bulgarian emperor Ivan Asen II could not decide whether to support the Niceaen Greeks or the Latins, and no decisive action was taken. Eventually Michael VIII Palaiologos, the ruler of the Niceaen Empire captured Constantinople and restored the Byzantine Empire, bringing an end to the Latin Empire.

== Bulgarian–Latin battles ==
Battle	Year	Bulgarian Commander	Latin Commander	Result
Battle of Adrianople	1205	Kaloyan	Baldwin I	Bulgarian victory
Battle of Serres	1205	Kaloyan	Henry I	Bulgarian victory
Battle of Rusion	1206	Kaloyan	Thierry de Termond	Bulgarian victory
Battle of Rodosto	1206	Kaloyan	Henry I	Bulgarian victory
Battle of Messinopolis	1207	Kaloyan	Boniface of Montferrat	Bulgarian victory
Battle of Beroia	1207	Boril	Henry I	Bulgarian victory
Battle of Philippopolis	1208	Boril	Henry I	Latin victory
Siege of Constantinople	1235	Ivan Asen II	John of Brienne	Two-year truce

== See also ==
- Cumans
