= Battle of Mosynopolis =

Battle in 1207 in Greece

- Part of the Bulgarian–Latin wars
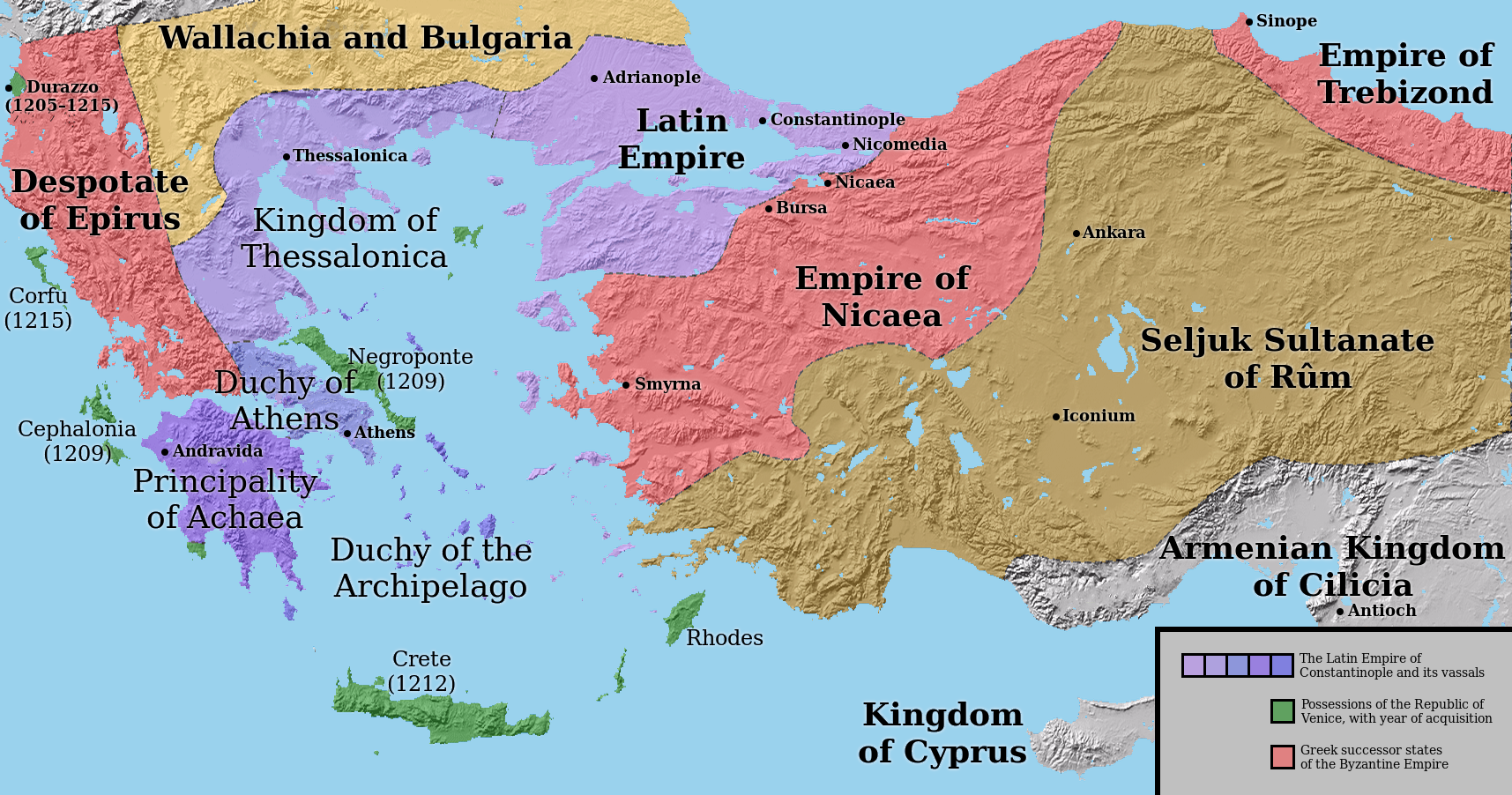
- The Latin Empire (purple) and partition of the Byzantine Empire (c. 1205)
Date	4 September 1207
Location	Mosynopolis, Thrace
Result	Bulgarian victory

Belligerents
Bulgarian Empire	Latin Empire

Commanders and leaders
Kaloyan	Boniface of Montferrat †

The Battle of Mosynopolis (Bulgarian: Битка при Месинопол) took place on 4 September 1207 near Mosynopolis, located close to the modern town of Komotini, Greece, where Bulgarians defeated the Latin Empire's forces.

In early 1207, the Bulgarian Tsar Kaloyan allied with Emperor Theodore I Laskaris of Nicaea to attack the Latin Empire, forcing Emperor Henry to relinquish territory in Asia Minor. In response, Henry arranged a meeting with Boniface of Montferrat, who was King of Thessalonica, for a joint campaign against Kaloyan at Kypsella, Thrace, to which Boniface agreed. Upon Boniface's return to Thessalonica, he was ambushed near Mosynopolis by Bulgarian forces and was killed. Seizing the opportunity created by Boniface's death, Kaloyan besieged Thessalonica, but his sudden death abruptly ended the siege and created a power vacuum in Bulgaria that allowed Henry to consolidate the Latin Empire's territories.

== Background ==
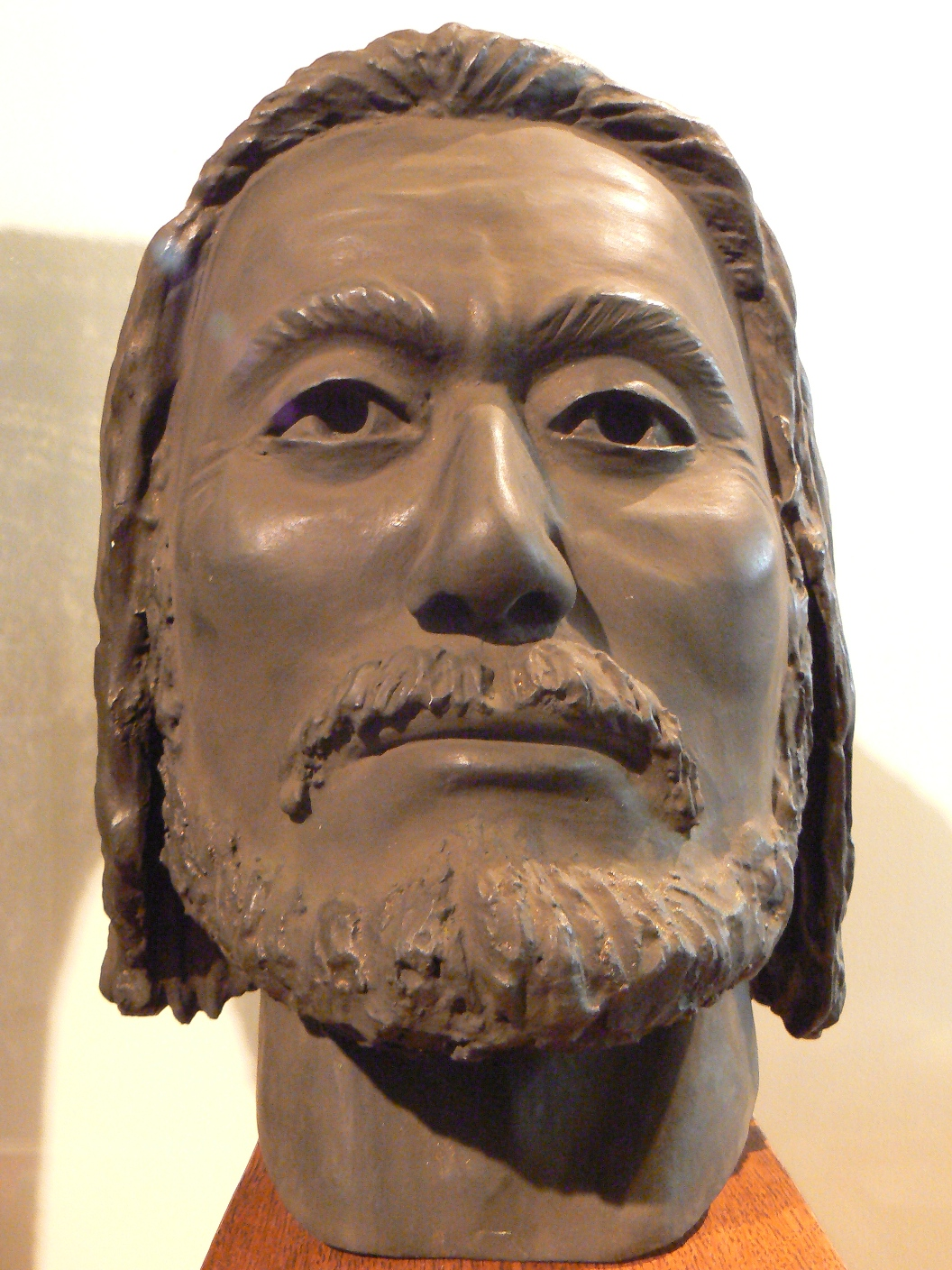
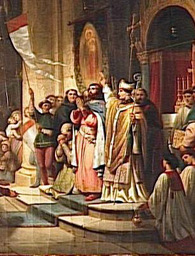
(Left) Facial reconstruction of Tsar Kaloyan based on the skull found near Holy Forty Martyrs Church, Veliko Tarnovo; however, the identification of the skull is disputed. (Right) Boniface I (right) is elected leader of the Fourth Crusade at Soissons (1840).

The Fourth Crusade resulted in the partition of the Byzantine Empire's territories among the crusaders. Among the crusaders, Boniface of Montferrat became King of Thessalonica in 1204 and Henry of Flanders became the Latin emperor of Constantinople a year later. Both men began to consolidate their power and expand their territories. Their authority was immediately challenged by the Byzantine rump states, Nicaea and Trebizond. Meanwhile, in the north, Kaloyan gathered an army and within a short period of time (1204–1207) controlled parts of Macedonia and frequently raided Thrace, regions claimed by the newly established Latin kingdoms.

Between 1206 and 1207, Emperor Theodore I Laskaris of Nicaea and Bulgarian Tsar Kaloyan concluded an alliance to attack the Latin territories at the same time. Kaloyan advanced into Thrace in early 1207 and besieged Adrianople, while the Nicaeans attacked Latin-held fortresses in northwestern Anatolia. Henry, who lacked the resources and manpower to face two fronts, made peace with Laskaris by ceding territory in Anatolia. Kaloyan was unable to take Adrianople, because his Cuman allies withdrew. In the meantime, Boniface regained control of Serres, which had been captured in 1205 by Kaloyan, and restored its fortifications.

== Ambush ==
After making peace in the summer, Henry returned to Adrianople and initiated negotiations with Boniface for a joint campaign against Kaloyan at Kypsella. At the meeting, Boniface agreed to become Henry's vassal, but it was never realized, because Boniface, upon his return to Thessalonica, was killed on 4 September at Mosynopolis.

Different sources provide conflicting accounts of the events of Boniface's death. According to Geoffroy de Villehardouin, local Bulgarians ambushed him by taking advantage of the fact that Boniface was accompanied by a small number of soldiers. After killing him, they sent his head to Kaloyan. Niketas Choniates, the Chronicle of Morea, and the crusader knight Robert de Clari claim that Kaloyan orchestrated the ambush. Having recently dispatched an army of Vlachs and Cumans toward Mosynopolis, he learned that Boniface was in the vicinity and ordered 200 mounted archers (likely Cumans) to attack. Boniface was killed by an arrow, as were the soldiers accompanying him. Alexandru Madgearu argues that these accounts appear closer to the actual events than Villehardouin's version and notes that none mention what became of Boniface's body.

== Aftermath ==
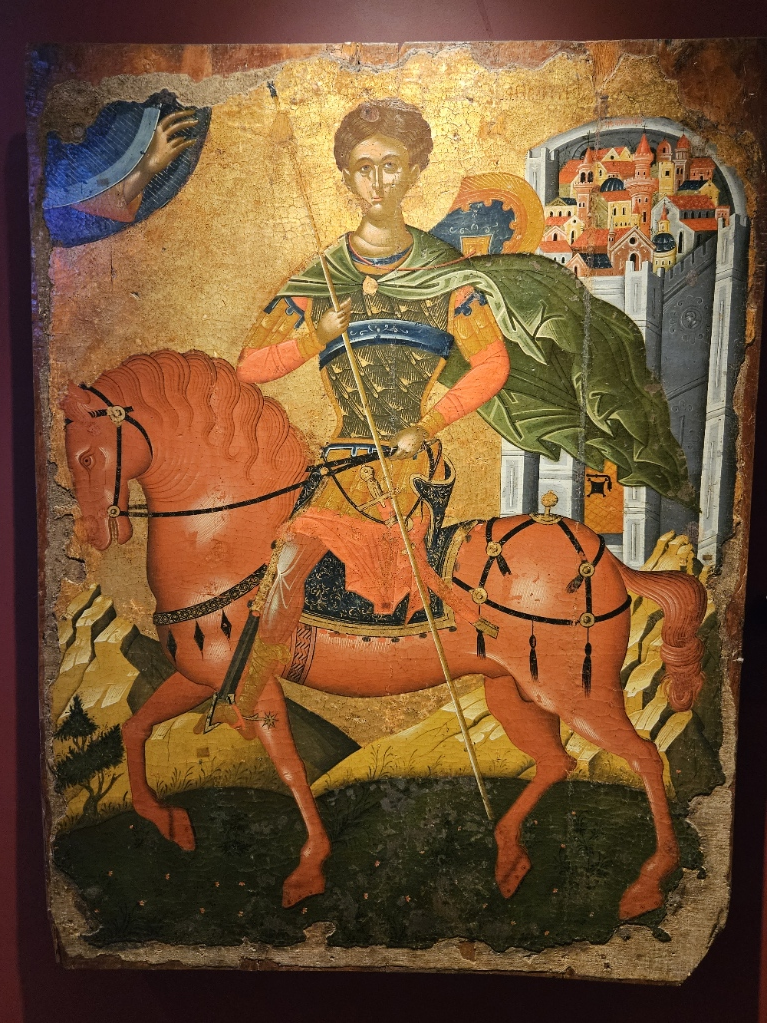
Saint Demetrios and the city of Thessalonica in the background, a painting from the late 16th century by an unknown artist, in the Byzantine Museum of Antivouniotissa in Corfu.

The ancient foundations of Mosynopolis were destroyed by Kaloyan's forces; the remaining inhabitants of the city moved within the preserved fortress, forming new foundations of a later city.

In October 1207, Kaloyan organized a campaign against Thessalonica, the capital of Boniface's kingdom, taking advantage of the political confusion arising from his death. The regent of the city was Boniface's wife, Margaret, on behalf of her underage son, Demetrios, raising leadership questions among the local nobles. In the early stages of the siege, Kaloyan died, abruptly ending the siege. Over time, his mysterious death gave rise to a legend claiming that St. Demetrius, the patron saint of Thessalonica, struck down Kaloyan in his tent on October 26, the same day dedicated to the saint's celebration. Contemporary historian George Akropolites wrote that Kaloyan died of pleurisy. Scholars argue that his death was caused by his Cuman allies over internal rivalries or resentment over his harshness.

Kaloyan's death also created a power vacuum in the kingdom, effectively halting Bulgaria's rapid expansion. Henry took advantage of the disarray in Bulgaria's leadership and was able to recover the Latin Empire's territories taken by Kaloyan.

== Notes ==
1. Boniface became vassal of the first emperor of the Latin Empire, Baldwin I, in 1204. Following Baldwin I's death in 1205, Henry became the next emperor, angering Boniface as he expected to inherit the position himself. This led Boniface to act independently of the emperor's wishes.

== Sources ==
- Curta, Florin, ed. (2022). The Routledge Handbook of East Central and Eastern Europe in the Middle Ages, 500–1300. London/New York: Routledge. ISBN 978-1-032-12782-8.
- Fine, John V. A. (1994). The Late Medieval Balkans: A Critical Survey from the Late Twelfth Century to the Ottoman Conquest. Michigan: University of Michigan Press. ISBN 0-472-08260-4.
- Kiel, Machiel (1971). "Observations on the History of Northern Greece during the Turkish Rule, Komotini and Serres". Balkan studies. 12 (2): 415–462.
- Madgearu, Alexandru (2016). The Asanids: The Political and Military History of the Second Bulgarian Empire, 1185-1280. Leiden/Boston: Brill. ISBN 978-90-04-32501-2.
