= Siege of Serdica (809) =

809 siege

- Part of the Byzantine–Bulgarian wars
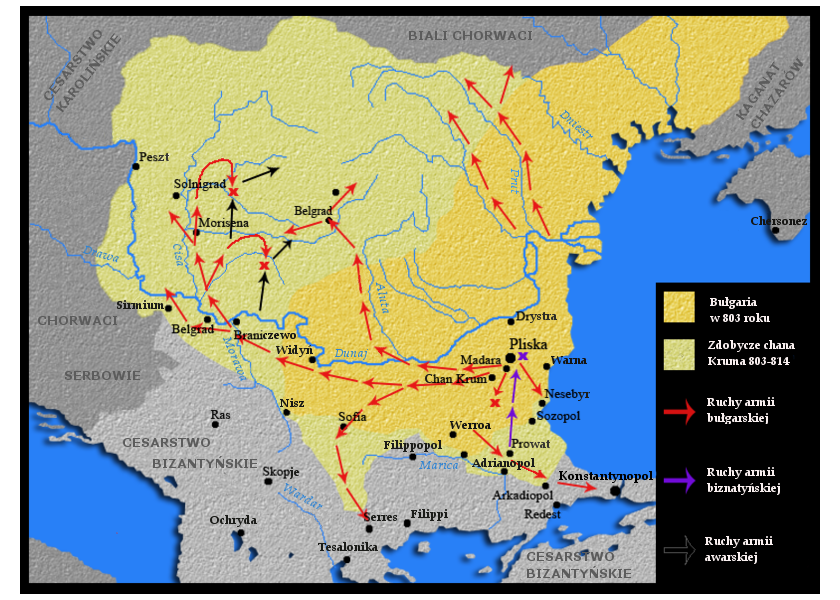
Date	Spring 809
Location	Sofia 42°40′0″N 23°19′48″E
Result	Bulgarian victory

Belligerents
Bulgarian Empire	Byzantine Empire

Commanders and leaders
Krum	Unknown

Strength
Unknown	6,000

Casualties and losses
Unknown	6,000

The siege of Serdica (Bulgarian: Обсадата на Сердика) took place in the spring of 809 at modern Sofia, Bulgaria. As a result, the city was annexed to the Bulgarian State and remained so until the fall of the First Bulgarian Empire.

== Historical background ==
After the destruction of the Avar Khaganate, Khan Krum turned his gaze to the southwest to liberate the Slavs who populated the valley of the Struma River and Macedonia. The main obstacle to Krum's plan, however, was the strong Byzantine fortress at Serdica.

The Byzantine Empire, however, was the first to initiate conflict. In 807, the Byzantine emperor Nikephoros I marched against Bulgaria but was soon forced to return to Constantinople due to a mutiny of his troops at Adrianople. The following year, the Bulgarians, in response to an equestrian raid in the valley of the Struma River, defeated the Byzantines and captured their baggage.

== Siege ==
In the spring of 809, Krum took the offensive and surprised the Byzantines by besieging Serdica. The garrison held out for several weeks even as food supplies shrank and the number of men declined due to desertions and the release of mercenaries. At Easter, the Byzantines were ready to surrender the fortress.

Krum promised to give safe conduct to the Byzantines on condition they yield the fortress. The Byzantines agreed and Krum entered Serdica before Easter. Despite Krum's promise of safe conduct, he killed the entire garrison of 6,000 along with some of the citizens. Nikephoros was unhappy with those Byzantines who abandoned the garrison and those who defected to the Bulgarians. One of those defecting was the highly skilled mechanic Evmat who would help Krum later on with the construction of siege machines.

== Aftermath ==
The taking of Serdica was significant for Bulgaria in that the city was a major crossroad of Southeast Europe. In addition, Serdica was used as a primary military position by later rulers of Bulgaria to expand borders and spread their influence.
