= Battle of Rodosto =

Battle in 1206 in modern-day Turkey

- Part of Bulgarian–Latin wars
| Date | February, 1206 |
| Location | Tekirdağ |
| Result | Bulgarian victory |

Belligerents
| Bulgarian Empire | Latin Empire |

Commanders and leaders
| Kaloyan | Unknown |

Strength
| Several thousand | Several thousand |

Casualties and losses
| Light | Heavy |

The battle of Rodosto (Bulgarian: Битка при Родосто) took place in February 1206 in the town of Rodosto (today Tekirdağ, Turkey) between the Bulgarians led by Emperor Kaloyan and the Crusaders. It resulted in a Bulgarian victory.

After the Bulgarians annihilated the Latin army in the battle of Rusion on 31 January 1206 the remnants of the shattered Crusader forces headed to the coastal town of Rodosto to seek refuge. The town had a strong Venetian garrison and was further supported by a regiment of 2,000 troops from Constantinople. However, the fear of the Bulgarians was so great that the Latins panicked with the very arrival of the Bulgarian soldiers. They were incapable to resist and after a short battle the Venetians began to flee to their ships in the port. In their haste to escape many boats were overloaded and sank and most Venetians drowned. The town was looted by the Bulgarians who continued their victorious march through eastern Thrace and captured many more towns and fortresses.
