= Battle of Philippopolis (1208) =

Coordinates: 42°9′0″N 24°45′0″E

- Part of Bulgarian–Latin wars
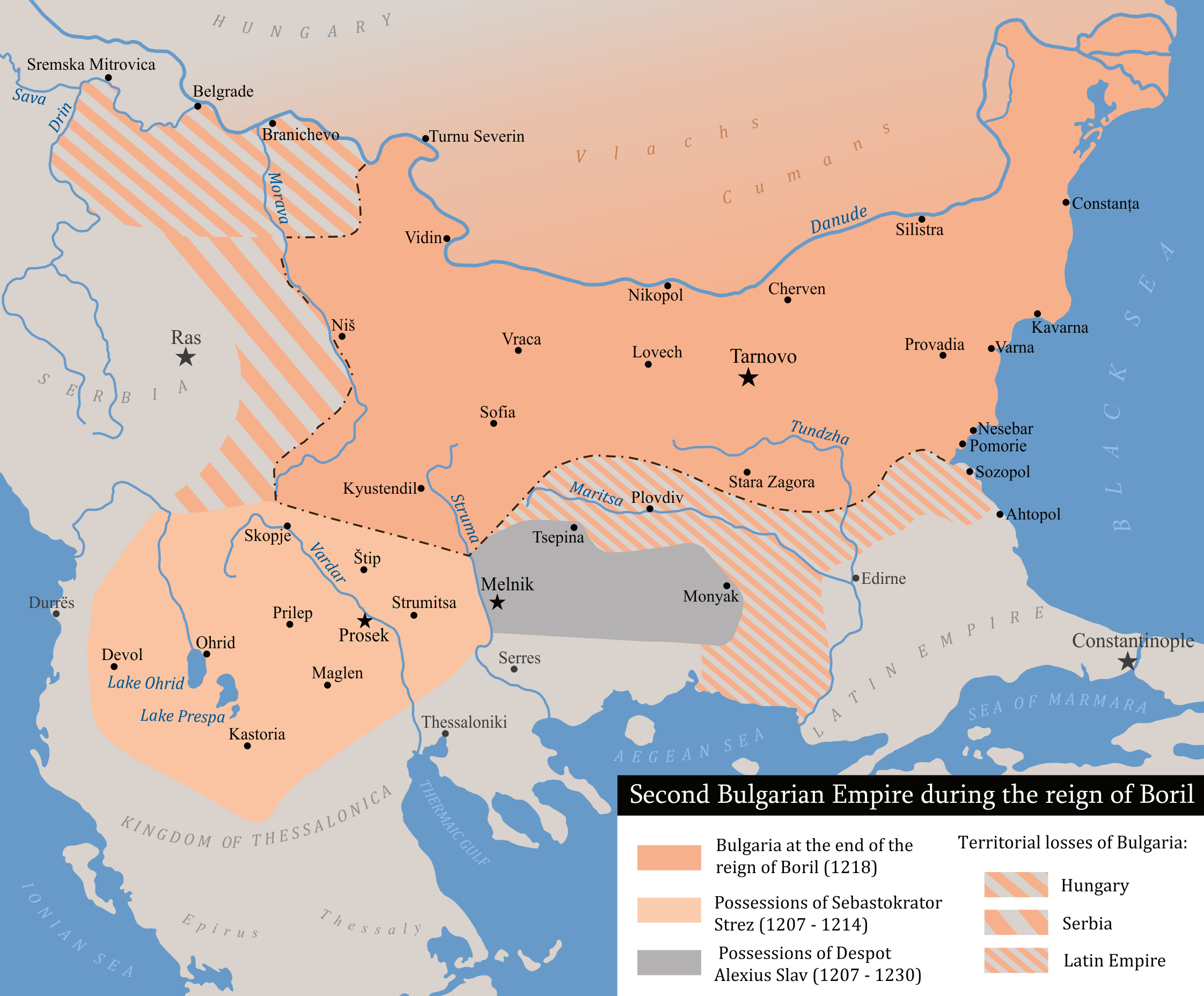
- Territorial losses of Bulgaria after the defeat at Plovdiv.
Date	30 June 1208
Location	Surroundings of Philippopolis (modern Plovdiv, Bulgaria)
Result	Latin victory: Peace treaty signed between Boril and Henry of Flanders

Belligerents
Bulgarian Empire; Cuman Mercenaries	Latin Empire

Commanders and leaders
Boril	Henry of Flanders; Eustace of Flanders; Renier of Trit; Geoffrey Villehardouin; Gérard de Stroim

Strength
27,000–30,000, incl. 7,000 Cuman light and missile cavalry and 6,000 Bulgarian heavy cavalry, 1,800–2,200 rearguard (Gyuzelev, Angelov) 18,000–24,000, incl. 6,000–9,000 Cuman light cavalry (Dimitrov) 33,000 (Henry of Valenciennes)	Around 30,000 (incl. 8,000 heavy cavalry, of which ca. 400 knights (Gyuzelev, Angelov) 20,000–24,000 total: Latin heavy cavalry, Latin and Greek infantry (Dimitrov)

Casualties and losses
Unknown, possibly significant	Unknown

The Battle of Philippopolis or Battle of Plovdiv (Bulgarian: Битка при Пловдив) took place on 30 June 1208 in the surroundings of Philippopolis (modern Plovdiv, Bulgaria) between the armies of the Bulgarian Empire and the Latin Empire. The Crusaders were victorious.

== Origins of the conflict ==
After the armies of the Fourth Crusade seized Constantinople, the Byzantine capital, in 1204, they established a new empire on previously Byzantine territories and continued to fight the states which emerged from the Byzantine Empire - the Despotate of Epiros in Europe and the Nicaean Empire in Asia Minor. Its Emperor Baldwin I rejected the peace proposal of the Bulgarian Emperor Kaloyan and on the following year the Crusader army was annihilated by the Bulgarians in the battle of Adrianople and Baldwin himself was captured and died as a prisoner in Tarnovo.

However, Kaloyan was murdered during the siege of Thessalonica in 1207. The conspirators were organized by his cousin Boril who succeeded the Bulgarian crown. The new Emperor had to cope with the supporters of the country's legitimate heir Ivan Asen II who was juvenile at that time. This gave precious time for the Latin Empire to reorganize.

== The battle ==
In the spring of 1208, Boril considered that the internal situation in Bulgaria had calmed down and turned his attention to foreign-political affairs. It seems that he supported the policy of his predecessor and continued the war against the Latin Empire. The Bulgarian army invaded Thrace and defeated the Crusaders near Beroe (modern Stara Zagora). Inspired, Boril marched southward and, on 30 June 1208, he encountered the main Latin army. Boril had between 27,000 and 30,000 soldiers, of which 7000 mobile Cuman cavalry, very successful in the Adrianople's battle. The number of Latin army is also around 30,000 fighters total, including several hundred knights. Boril tried to apply the same tactics used by Kaloyan at Adrianople - the mounted archers harassed the Crusaders trying to stretch their line to lead them towards the main Bulgarian forces. The knights, however, had learned the bitter lesson from Adrianople and did not repeat the same mistake. Instead, they organized a trap and attacked the detachment which was personally commanded by the Tsar, who had only 1,600 men and could not withstand the assault. Boril fled and the whole Bulgarian army pulled back.

The Bulgarians knew that the enemy would not chase them into the mountains so they retreated towards one of the eastern passes of the Balkan Mountains, Turia. The Crusaders who followed the Bulgarian army were attacked in a hilly country near the contemporary village of Zelenikovo by the Bulgarian rear guard and, after a bitter fight, were defeated. However, their formation did not collapse as the main Latin forces arrived and the battle continued for a very long time until the Bulgarians retreated to the north after the bulk of their army had safely passed through the mountains. The Crusaders then retreated to Philippopolis.

== Aftermath ==
The defeat was not disastrous and on the following year the war resumed. Boril was energetic and persistent, but could never fulfill his plans. In 1209, Henry managed to win over Alexius Slav, who ruled the Rhodopes, and married him to his daughter. To compensate, Boril had to arrange an alliance with his brother Strez who ruled in Prosek - he had received the high title sevastokrator and the right to govern his lands freely. In 1211, the Bulgarians formed an alliance with the Niceans, but the allies could not take Constantinople. After that failure Boril reorientated his policy and the two Empires settled peace after the marriage of Kaloyan's daughter Maria of Bulgaria and the Latin Emperor Henry.

== Sources ==
- Йордан Андреев, Милчо Лалков, Българските ханове и царе, Велико Търново, 1996.
- Fine, John V. A. (1994). The Late Medieval Balkans: A Critical Survey from the Late Twelfth Century to the Ottoman Conquest. The University of Michigan Press.
- Van Tricht, Filip (2011). The Latin Renovatio of Byzantium: The Empire of Constantinople (1204–1228). Leiden: Brill. ISBN 978-90-04-20323-5.
