= Battle of Beroia (1208) =

Bulgarian victory over the Latin Empire

- Part of Bulgarian–Latin wars
Date	June, 1208
Location	Stara Zagora 42°26′N 25°39′E
Result	Bulgarian victory

Belligerents
Bulgarian Empire	Latin Empire

Commanders and leaders
Boril	Henry of Flanders

Strength
Unknown	Unknown

Casualties and losses
Unknown	Heavy

The battle of Beroia (Bulgarian: Битка при Боруй) took place in June 1208 near the city of Stara Zagora, Bulgaria between the Bulgarians and the Latin Empire. It resulted in a Bulgarian victory.

== Origins of the conflict ==
In the summer of 1208 the new Emperor of Bulgaria Boril who continued the war of his predecessor Kaloyan against the Latin Empire invaded Eastern Thrace. The Latin Emperor Henry gathered an army in Selymbria (Silivri) and headed to Adrianople (Odrin).

== The battle ==
Upon the news of the Crusaders' march, the Bulgarians retreated to better positions in the area of Beroia (Stara Zagora). At night, they sent the Byzantine captives and the spoil to the north of the Balkan Mountains and moved in a battle formation to the Latin camp, which was not fortified. At dawn, they suddenly attacked and the soldiers on duty put up a fierce fight to gain some time for the rest to prepare for battle. While the Latins were still forming their squads, they suffered heavy casualties, specially by the hands of the numerous and well-experienced Bulgarian archers, who shot those still without their armour. In the meantime the Bulgarian cavalry managed to go round the Latin flanks and managed to attack their main forces. In the battle that ensued, the Crusaders lost many men and the Emperor himself was lariated, barely escaping from captivity - a knight managed to cut the rope with his sword and protected Henry from the Bulgarian arrows with his heavy armour. In the end the Crusaders, forced by Bulgarian cavalry, pulled back and retreated to Philippopolis (Plovdiv) in battle formation.

== Aftermath ==
The retreat continued for twelve days, in which the Bulgarians closely followed and harassed their opponents inflicting casualties mainly to the Latin rear-guard which was saved several times from complete collapse by the main Crusader forces. However, near Plovdiv the Crusaders finally accepted the battle and the Bulgarians were defeated.
