= Battle of Serres (1205) =

Battle between the Bulgarian and Latin empires

Coordinates: 41°5′N 23°33′E

- Part of Bulgarian–Latin wars
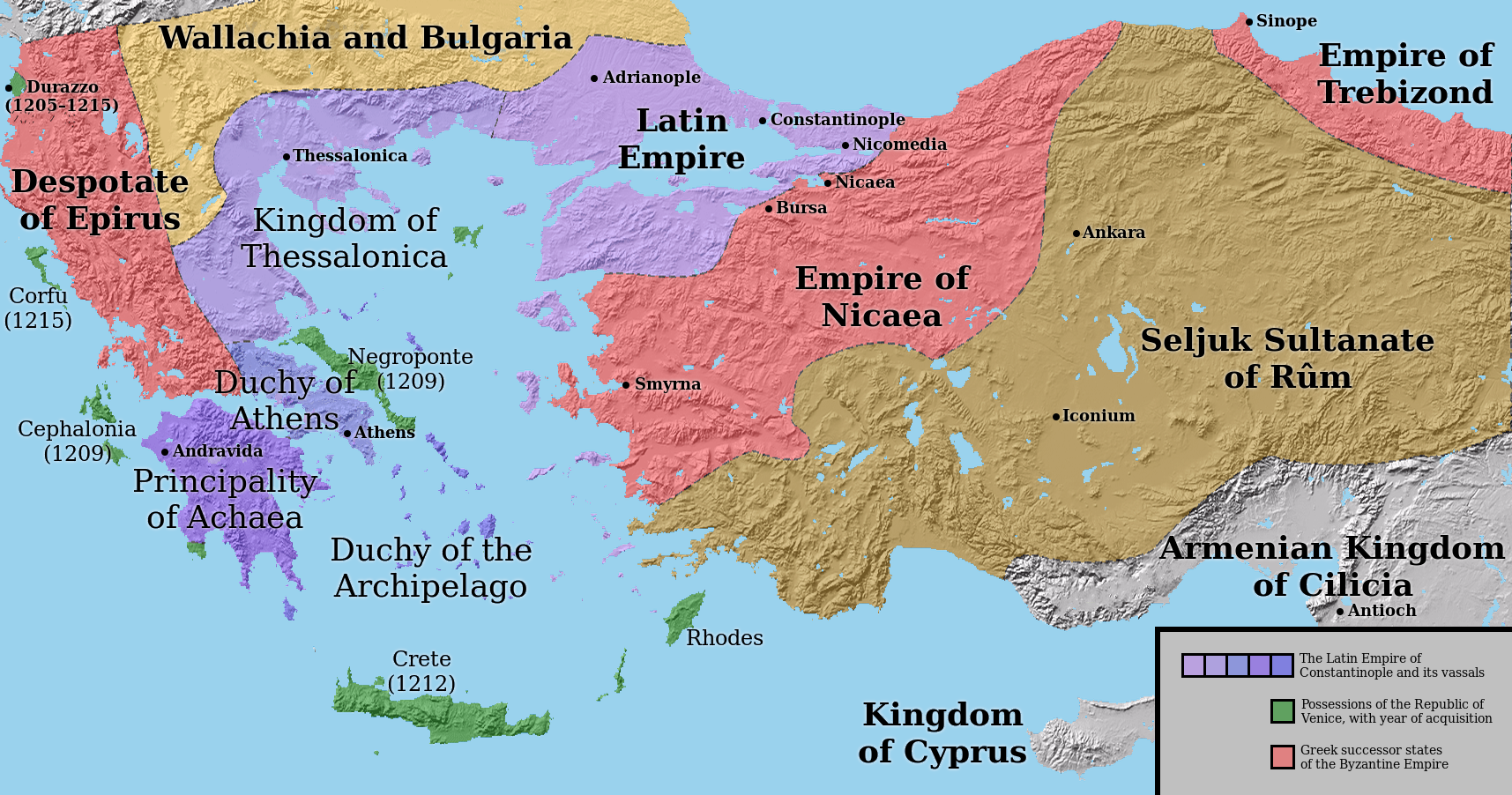
- The Latin Empire (purple) and partition of the Byzantine Empire (c. 1205).
Date	June 1205
Location	Serres, Thrace
Result	Bulgarian victory

Belligerents
Bulgarian Empire	Latin Empire

Commanders and leaders
Kaloyan	Hugues de Coligny †; Guillaume d'Arles †
- Location within Greece

The battle of Serres (Bulgarian: Битка при Сяр) took place in June 1205 in the town of Serres in Greece, where the Bulgarian Empire seized control of the city from the Latin Empire.

In the aftermath of the Fourth Crusade, the Latin Empire struggled to assert control over the former Byzantine territories, facing resistance from the Greek population and the expansionist Bulgarian Tsar Kaloyan. In 1205, after capturing Emperor Baldwin I at Adrianople, Kaloyan turned his forces westward, defeating the Crusaders at Serres and punishing its defenders. The destruction of Serres and later Philippopolis, led the Greek towns to switch their allegiance to the Latin Empire, weakening the Bulgarian influence in the region.

== Origins of the conflict ==
The Fourth Crusade resulted in the Sack of Constantinople and partition of Byzantine Empire's territories among the crusaders. In 1204, Boniface Montferrat became King of Thessalonica and vassal of Baldwin I, who became the Latin emperor of Constantinople. Both men started to consolidate their power and expand their territories. However, their authority was immediately challenged by Byzantine rump states (Nicaea and Trebizond) and many Greek towns resisted the newly established authority of the Latin Empire. Meanwhile, in the north, Kaloyan gathered an army aiming to control parts of Macedonia and Thrace, regions claimed by the newly established Latin kingdoms.

In early 1205, Greek landholders in Thrace requested Tsar Kaloyan to intervene against the Latin overlords. Much of Thrace, whether independent Greek towns or towns allied with the Latin Empire, was fallen into the hands of Kaloyan. Except for the city of Adrianople which was controlled by the local Greek lords. Baldwin I, who was campaigning in Anatolia, marched with his army into Thrace and laid siege to regain Adrianople. He faced the Bulgarian forces in the battle, where he was defeated and captured on 14 April 1205. However, Kaloyan hesitated to proceed against Constantinople in the east, and instead, he moved the theatre of the military actions westward to the domains of Boniface.

== Battle ==
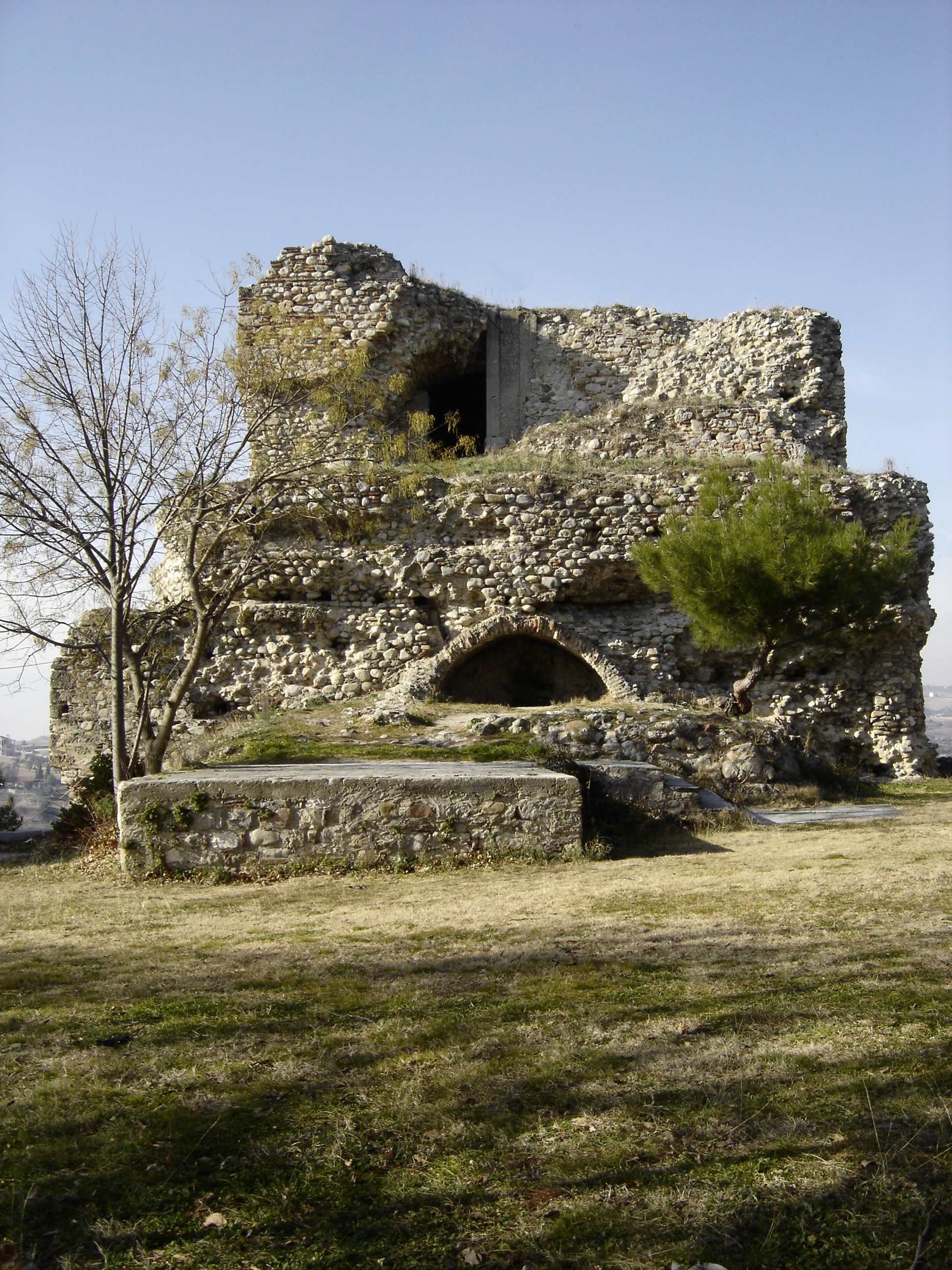
Remains of a Byzantine citadelle at Serres

The first town on the way of the Bulgarian army was Serres. The Crusaders fought back in the vicinity of the town. After the death of the commander Hugues de Coligny, they pulled back to the town. The Bulgarian forces were successful in their pursue of the crusaders' retreat and entered Serres. The remaining Latins under the command of Guillaume d'Arles were besieged in the citadel.

In the negotiations which followed Kaloyan agreed to give them safe conduct to the Bulgarian-Hungarian border. He also promised the population's safe departure together with their moveable property. However, after the garrison surrendered, Kaloyan changed his mind, and the garrison leaders were killed. He also captured a large number of prisoners (in the order of hundreds) and sent them to Bulgaria as captives.

== Aftermath ==
Much of the foundations of the city were destroyed, reducing it from a sizable urban centre to a small settlement clustered around the fortified citadel, while the lower town was protected by a weak stone wall.

The Byzantine nobles of Philippopolis, led by Alexios Aspietes and Theodore Branas, learned of Kaloyan's actions at Serres, and took over the city to prevent the city surrender. Kaloyan moved north from Serres against the city. After Kaloyan seized the city, its ramparts were also destroyed, and the nobility was executed and exiled. Kalojan's conduct at Serres and later in Philippopolis caused widespread disillusionment among the Greeks, prompting numerous Greek towns to switch allegiance from the Bulgarians to the Latin Empire. In response, Kaloyan launched raids in Thrace in the spring of 1206, however, his Greeks soldiers deserted. Ultimately, Kaloyan's brutality undermined his efforts to consolidate the Bulgarian Empire.

== Sources ==
=== Primary ===
- de Villehardouin, Geoffroy (1824) [c. 1210]. Mémoires de Geoffroy de Ville-Hardouin, maréchal de Champagne et de Romanie, ou, Histoire de la conquête de Constantinople par les Français et les Vénitiens [Memoirs of Geoffroy de Villehardouin, Marshal of Champagne and Romania, or, History of the Conquest of Constantinople by the French and Venetians] (in French). Paris: Foucault. OCLC 1090040840.

=== Secondary ===
- Fine, John VA. (1994). The Late Medieval Balkans: A Critical Survey from the Late Twelfth Century to the Ottoman Conquest. Mischigan: University of Michigan Press. ISBN 0-472-08260-4.
- Hupchick, D. (2002). The Balkans: from Constantinople to communism. New York: Palgrave. ISBN 9780312299132.
- Gregory, Timothy E.; Ševčenko, Nancy Patterson (1991). "Serres". In Kazhdan, Alexander (ed.). The Oxford Dictionary of Byzantium. Oxford and New York: Oxford University Press. ISBN 0-19-504652-8.
- Herrin, J.; Saint-Guillain, G., eds. (2011). Identities and Allegiances in the Eastern Mediterranean after 1204. Surrey: Ashgate Publishing. ISBN 9781409410980.
