= Index of Bulgarian Empire–related articles =

This is a list of people, places, and events related to the medieval Bulgarian Empires — the First Bulgarian Empire (681–1018), and the Second Bulgarian Empire (1185–1396).

Notes

- Feel free to add more, and create missing pages. For further information on that era, see the Index of Byzantine Empire-related articles.
- People are listed by first name. Events, monuments and institutions like "Battle/Siege/Council/Church/Duchy/etc. of NNN" are listed by the location/name.

== A ==
- Achelous (917), Battle of
- Adrianople (1205), Battle of
- Adrianople (1254), Battle of
- Adrianople (813), Siege of
- Agatha, wife of Edward the Exile
- Agatha, wife of Samuel of Bulgaria
- Ajjar
- Ajtony
- Albania under the Bulgarian Empire
- Aldimir
- Alexius Slav
- Alexander (son of Ivan Shishman)
- Alogobotur
- Alusian of Bulgaria
- Anchialus (708), Battle of
- Anchialus (763), Battle of
- Andronikos Asen
- Anevo Fortress
- Anna (Anisia)
- Anna (daughter of Boris I)
- Anna Neda of Serbia
- Anna Maria of Hungary
- Anna of Wallachia
- Anna Terter of Bulgaria
- Anna-Theodora Asenina of Bulgaria
- Arcadiopolis (970), Battle of
- Arcadiopolis (1194), Battle of
- Archbishopric of Ohrid
- Aron
- Asen dynasty
- Asen's Fortress
- Asen and Peter, Uprising of
- Asparukh
- Avars

== B ==
- Baba Vida
- Bachkovo Monastery
- Baldwin's Tower
- Ballshi Inscription
- Ban (title)
- Basil I of Bulgaria
- Basil II of Bulgaria
- Batbayan
- Belaur
- Belogradchik Fortress
- Beloslava of Bulgaria
- Berziti
- Berzitia, Battle of
- Beshevliev, Veselin
- Bitola (1015), Battle of
- Bitola inscription
- Bogomil (priest)
- Bogomilism
- Boila
- Boril
- Boril, book of
- Boris I
- Boris II
- Boruy, Battle of
- Boulgarophygon, Battle of
- Boyana Church
- Boyar
- Bozhenishki Urvich
- Braničevci
- Bulgaria
- Bulgaria (theme)
- Bulgaria, Byzantine conquest of
- Bulgaria, Christianization of
- Bulgaria, Sviatoslav's invasion of
- Bulgarian army, medieval
- Bulgarian coinage, medieval
- Bulgarian Empire
- Bulgarian Empire, First
- Bulgarian Empire, Second
- Bulgarian khans, Nominalia of the
- Bulgarian literature, medieval
- Bulgarian navy, medieval
- Bulgarian royal charters, medieval
- Bulgarians
- Bulgars
- Byalgrad
- Byzantine Empire, Bulgarian wars with
- Byzantine Empire, 894–896 war with
- Byzantine Empire, 913–927 war with
- Byzantine civil war of 1321–28
- Byzantine civil war of 1341–47

== C ==
- Catherine of Bulgaria
- Chaka
- Chatalar Inscription
- Chernomen, Battle of
- Chernomen, Treaty of
- Chernorizets Hrabar
- Cherven (fortress)
- Christ Pantocrator (Nesebar), Church of
- Clement of Ohrid
- Codex Assemanius
- Codex Marianus
- Codex Suprasliensis
- Codex Zographensis
- Cometopuli dynasty
- Comita Nikola
- Constantine II
- Constantine of Kostenets
- Constantine of Preslav
- Constantine Tikh Asen
- Constantinople (922), Battle of
- Constantinople (717-718), Siege of
- Constantinople (1235), Siege of
- Cosmas the Priest
- Croatian–Bulgarian battle of 927
- Croatia, Bulgarian wars with
- Cuman Tsaritsa of Bulgaria, The
- Cumans
- Cyprian, Metropolitan of Moscow
- Cyrillic script
- Cyrillic alphabet, early

== D ==
- Darman and Kudelin
- Daskal Philip Psalter
- David
- Dejan (magnate)
- Demetrius of Bulgaria
- St Demetrius (Patalenitsa), Church of
- St Demetrius of Thessaloniki (Veliko Tarnovo), Church of
- Desislava of Bulgaria
- Despot (court title)
- Devina, Battle of
- Devingrad
- Devol (Albania)
- Dionisiy Divniy
- Dobreyshovo Gospels
- Dobromir Chrysos
- Dobrotitsa
- Dorotheus of Bulgaria
- Dobruja, Despotate of
- Dorostolon, Siege of
- Dragana of Serbia
- Drougoubitai
- Dorothea of Bulgaria
- Dulo clan
- Dyrrhachium (1018), Battle of

== E ==
- Elena Asenina of Bulgaria
- Elena of Bulgaria
- Elemag
- Elisabeth of Courtenay
- Enina Apostle
- Enravota
- Euphrosyne of Bulgaria
- Evtimiy of Tarnovo

== F ==
- Fruzhin

== G ==
- Gate of Trajan
- Gates of Trajan, Battle of the
- Gavril Radomir
- George Sursuvul
- George Terter I
- George Terter II
- St George (Kyustendil), Church of
- Georgi Voiteh
- Georgi Voiteh, Uprising of
- Gigen
- Glad
- Glagolitic alphabet
- Gostun
- Grand Župan
- Gregory of Bulgaria
- Gregory the Bulgarian
- Gregory of Sinai
- Gregory Tsamblak
- Gyuzelev, Vasil

== H ==
- Hagia Sophia Church, Nesebar
- Hagia Sophia Church, Sofia
- Helena of Bulgaria
- Holy Archangels Michael and Gabriel (Nesebar), Church of the
- Holy Ascension of God, Patriarchal Cathedral of the
- Holy Mother of God (Asen's Fortress), Church of the
- Holy Mother of God (Donja Kamenica), Church of the
- Holy Mother of God Eleusa (Nesebar), Church of the
- Holy Forty Martyrs (Veliko Tarnovo), Church of the
- Holy Trinity, Patriarchal Monastery of the
- Hranislav
- Hrelyo
- Hungary, Bulgarian wars with

== I ==
- Ichirgu-boil
- Ignatius of Bulgaria
- Ihtiman, Battle of
- Irene Doukaina Laskarina
- Irene Komnene Doukaina
- Irene Lekapene
- Irene of Larissa
- Irene Palaiologina
- Isbul
- Ivan II
- Ivan Alexander
- Ivan Asen I
- Ivan Asen II
- Ivan Asen III
- Ivan Asen IV
- Ivan Asen V
- Ivan Shishman
- Ivan Sratsimir
- Ivan Stephen
- Ivan the Russian
- Ivan Vladislav
- Ivanko (boyar)
- Ivanko (despot)
- Ivanovo, Rock-hewn Churches of
- Ivats
- Ivaylo
- Ivaylo, Uprising of

== J ==
- Jacob Svetoslav
- Jeremiah (Bulgarian priest)
- Joachim I of Bulgaria
- Joachim II of Bulgaria
- Joachim III of Bulgaria
- John the Exarch
- John Komnenos Asen
- John Kukuzelis
- John of Debar
- John of Rila
- Joseph II of Constantinople
- Jovan Vladimir
- St John Aliturgetos (Nesebar), Church of
- St John (Kaneo), Church of
- St John the Baptist (Asenovgrad), Church of
- St John the Baptist (Nesebar), Church of

== K ==
- Kaliman I
- Kaliman II
- Kaloyan
- Kaloyan and Desislava
- Kanasubigi
- Kardam
- Katasyrtai, Battle of
- Kavhan
- Kera Tamara
- Keratsa of Bulgaria
- Keratsa Petritsa
- Kira Maria
- Kira Maria Asenina of Bulgaria
- Kleidion, Battle of
- Klokotnitsa, Battle of
- Klonimir
- Knyaz
- Konstantin and Fruzhin, Uprising of
- Kormesiy
- Kormisosh
- Kosara of Bulgaria
- Kozma Zografski
- Krakra of Pernik
- Krasen
- Kreta, Battle of
- Krum
- Krum's dynasty
- Ktenia
- Kuber
- Kubrat
- Kutmichevitsa

== L ==
- Lardea
- Latin Empire, Bulgarian wars with
- Leontius of Bulgaria
- Lovech, Siege of
- Lyutitsa
- Lovech, Despotate of

== M ==
- Macarius of Bulgaria
- Macedonia (theme)
- Macedonia (region)
- Macedonia (terminology)
- Madara Rider
- Malamir
- Malamirovo Inscription
- Marcellae (756), Battle of
- Marcellae (792), Battle of
- Maria
- Maria Asenina of Bulgaria
- Maria of Bulgaria, Latin Empress
- Maria-Irene Palaiologina
- Maria of Mangup
- Maria Palaiologina Kantakouzene
- Marina Smilets of Bulgaria
- Marko, Prince
- Marmais
- Markeli
- Matochina
- Mauros
- Menumorut
- Messinipolis, Battle of
- Mezek
- Michael II Asen
- Michael IV Asen
- Michael Shishman
- Michael of Bulgaria
- Michael (Bulgarian pretender)
- Miroslava of Bulgaria
- Mitso Asen
- Moesia
- Momchil
- Moses
- Mostich

== N ==
- Naum of Preslav
- Neboulos
- Nesebar
- Nestoritsa
- St Nicholas (Melnik), Church of
- St Nicholas (Sapareva Banya), Church of
- Nikulitsa

== O ==
- Ohrid
- Ohrid Literary School
- Old Church Slavonic
- Old Great Bulgaria
- Omurtag
- Omurtag's Tarnovo Inscription
- Ongal, Battle of
- Organa
- Ostrovo, Battle of
- Ottoman Empire, Bulgarian wars with

== P ==
- Pagan
- St Panteleimon (Ohrid), Church of
- Palace of Omurtag
- St Paraskevi (Nesebar), Church of
- Pechenegs
- Pegae, Battle of
- Peter I
- Peter II
- Peter III
- Peter IV
- Peter Delyan, Uprising of
- Peter (diplomat)
- St Peter (Berende), Church of
- Saints Peter and Paul (Nikopol), Church of
- Saints Peter and Paul (Veliko Tarnovo), Church of
- Philippopolis (1208), Battle of
- Pirdop Apostle
- Plenimir
- Pliska
- Pliska, Battle of
- Pliska, Great Basilica of
- Pliska, Rosette from
- Preslav
- Preslav, Council of
- Preslav Literary School
- Preslav, Round Church of
- Preslav Treasure
- Presian I
- Presian (son of Ivan Vladislav)
- Presian Inscription
- Prespa (medieval town)

== R ==
- Rahovets
- Ratimir, Duke of Lower Pannonia
- Rila Monastery
- Rishki Pass, Battle of the
- Rodosto, Battle of
- Roman
- Romylos of Vidin
- Rostislav Mikhailovich
- Rostislav Stratimirovic
- Rusion, Battle of
- Rusokastro, Battle of

== S ==
- Sabin
- Sagudates
- Saint Naum, Monastery of
- Saints Cyril and Methodius
- Salan
- Salonica (995), Battle of
- Salonica (1004), Battle of
- Salonica (1014), Battle of
- Salonica (1040), Battle of
- Salonica (2nd 1040), Battle of
- Samuel
- Samuil's Inscription
- Sandilch
- Sarah-Theodora
- Sava's book
- Sebastokrator
- Serbia, Bulgarian wars with
- Serbia, 839–842 war with
- Serbia, 853 war with
- Serbia, 917–924 war with
- Serdica (809), Siege of
- Sergius of Bulgaria
- Sermon (ruler)
- Serres (1196), Battle of
- Serres (1205), Battle of
- Setina, Battle of
- Sevar
- Seven Slavic tribes
- Severians
- Shishman
- Shishman dynasty
- Shishman of Vidin
- Shumen fortress
- Silistra, Battle of
- Simeon I
- Sirmium, Theme of
- Sırp Sındığı, Battle of
- Slavs
- Slavs, South
- Skafida, Battle of
- Skopje
- Skopje, Battle of
- Smilets
- Smilets dynasty
- Smiltsena Palaiologina
- Smolyani
- Sofia Psalter
- St Sophia (Ohrid), Church of
- Southern Buh, Battle of
- Sratsimir
- Sratsimir dynasty
- St Stephen (Nesebar), Church of
- Strez
- Strumitsa, Battle of
- Strymon (theme)

== T ==
- Tarnovo
- Tarnovo Artistic School, architecture
- Tarnovo Artistic School, painting
- Tarnovo Literary School
- Tarnovo Patriarchate
- Tarnovo, Siege of
- Telerig
- Telets
- Terter dynasty
- Tervel
- Tetraevangelia of Ivan Alexander
- Theodora Angelina (daughter of Isaac Komnenos)
- Theodora of Wallachia
- Theodora Palaiologina, Empress of Bulgaria
- Theodora Smilets of Bulgaria
- Theodore Sigritsa
- Theodore Svetoslav
- St Theodore (Boboshevo), Church of
- St Theodore (Nesebar), Church of
- Theodosius of Tarnovo
- Thessalonica (theme)
- Thrace
- Thrace (theme)
- Tihomir (Bulgarian noble)
- Timočani
- Tomić Psalter
- Toktu
- Treaty of 716, Byzantine–Bulgarian
- Treaty of 815, Byzantine–Bulgarian
- Tryavna, Battle of
- Tsar
- Tsarevets (fortress)
- Tsarina
- Tsepina

== U ==
- Umor
- Urvich
- Ustra

== V ==
- Václav Dobruský
- Varna (1201), Siege of
- Velbazhd, Battle of
- Venedikov, Ivan
- Versinikia, Battle of
- Vidin
- Vidin, Hungarian occupation of
- Vinekh
- Viola, Duchess of Opole
- Vissarion of Bulgaria
- Vladimir-Rasate
- Vladislav the Grammarian
- Vonko

== W ==
- Wallachia
- W.l.n.d.r, Battle of

== Y ==
- Yanuka

== Z ==
- Zabergan
- Zadar (998), Siege of
- Zemen Monastery
- Zlatarski, Vasil
- Zograf Monastery
- Zvinitsa

== Lists ==
- Bulgarian consorts
- Bulgarian monarchs
