= Timeline of Bulgarian history =

This is a timeline of Bulgarian history.

== Prior to 1st century ==
Year	Date	Event
6000 BC		The Karanovo culture appeared.
5000 BC		The Thracian village of Nebet Tepe is established on the site of modern Plovdiv.
4600 BC		Oldest gold artifacts were created.
4000 BC		Proto-Thracians settled near the Black Sea.
2100 BC		Dabene Treasure of 15,000 small Thracian gold rings created (approximate date).
512 BC		Macedonian king Amyntas I surrendered to the Thracians.
429 BC		Sitalces invaded Macedon.
342 BC		Thracian settlement of modern Plovdiv renamed to "Philippopolis".
298 BC		Arrival of the Celtic tribes.
212 BC		Abandonment of Tylis.
188 BC		Thrace invaded by the Romans

== 1st–6th centuries ==
Year	Date	Event
46		Thrace was conquered by Rome.
117		The Trimontium amphitheater was created.
268		The Goths raided Serdica.
343		The Council of Serdica takes place.
447		Huns start a fire in Sofia.

== 7th century ==
Year	Date	Event
632		Great Bulgaria was formed after the unification of the tribes of Kutrigurs, Utigurs, and Onogurs (Onodonduri).
635		A peace treaty was signed by Kubrat with the Byzantine Empire.
668		Khazar's pressure caused Great Bulgaria to decline. Volga Bulgaria (7th century–1240s) is formed.
680/681		First Bulgarian Empire (Danubian Bulgaria) was formed.

== 8th century ==
Year	Date	Event
701		Asparukh died in a battle. He was succeeded by Tervel.
705		Tervel received title as Caesar in 705 after recovering the throne of Justinian II.
721		Tervel died. He was succeeded by Kormesiy.
738		Kormesiy ended his rule. He was succeeded by Sevar.
753		Sevar died. He was succeeded by Kormisosh.
756		Kormisosh was disposed. He was succeeded by Vinekh.
762		Vinekh was assassinated. He was succeeded by Telets.
765		Telets was assassinated. He was succeeded by Sabin.
766		Sabin was disposed. He was succeeded by Umor.
766		Umor was disposed after a 40-day rule. He was succeeded by Toktu.
767		Toktu was killed. He was succeeded by Pagan.
768		Pagan was killed by their servants. He was succeeded by Telerig.
777		Telerig was baptized after flying to Constantinople. He was succeeded by Kardam.

== 9th century ==
Year	Date	Event
803		Kardam was baptized after fleeing to Constantinople. He was succeeded by Krum.
809		Sofia was renamed to "Sredetz" after becoming part of the Bulgarian Empire.
811	26 July	Byzantine Emperor Nicephorus I was killed after being involved in the Battle of Pliska.
814	13 April	Krum died. He was succeeded by Omurtag.
831		Omurtag died. He was succeeded by Malamir.
836		Malamir died. He was succeeded by Presian I.
852		Presian died. He was succeeded by Boris I.
883		Boris I abdicated.
886		The Glagolitic alphabet was adopted.
889		Boris I ended his rule. He was succeeded by Vladimir.
893		Vladimir was disposed and blinded. He was succeeded by Simeon I.

== 10th century ==
Year	Date	Event
902		Boris I died.
927	27 May	Simeon I died. He was succeeded by Peter I.
969		Peter I abdicated.
970	30 January	Peter I died. He was succeeded by Boris II.
971		The Byzantine Empire dethroned Boris II.
977		Boris II was killed by Bulgarian border guards after returning to Bulgaria. He was succeeded by Samuel.
991		The Byzantine Empire captured Roman.
997		Roman died in a Constantinople prison. He was succeeded by Boris II.

== 11th century ==
Year	Date	Event
1014	6 October	Samuel died. He was succeeded by Gavril Radomir.
1015		Gavril Radomir died. He was succeeded by Ivan Vladislav.
1018		The Byzantine Emperor Basil II annexed Bulgaria after the death of Ivan Vladislav.
1040		Peter Delyan organized a rebellion, but he failed to recreate the Bulgarian empire.
1041		Peter Delyan died.
1072		Constantine Bodin ruled the annexed Bulgaria under Byzantine rule.

== 12th century ==
Year	Date	Event
1185		Second Bulgarian Empire was formed.
1190		Peter II donated his throne to his brother Ivan Asen I.
1196		The Byzantine Empire created a large force after merging the eastern and western armies, but the large army was defeated at the Battle of Arcadiopolis.
1196		Ivan Asen I was murdered. Peter II returned to the throne.
1197		Peter II was murdered. He was succeeded by Kaloyan.

== 13th century ==
Year	Date	Event
1201	21 March	Siege of Varna (1201): The Bulgarian Empire and the Byzantine Empire compete for the city of Varna.
1201	24 March	Siege of Varna (1201): The Bulgarians claim victory to the battle and capture Varna.
1205		Forces of the Latin Empire were defeated by Kaloyan at the Battle of Adrianople.
1207		Kaloyan was murdered. He was succeeded by Boril.
1218		Boril was disposed. He was succeeded by Ivan Asen II.
1235		Recreation of the Bulgarian Orthodox Patriarchate.
1241	24 June	Boril died. He was succeeded by Kaliman Asen I.
1246		Kaliman Asen I died. He was succeeded by Michael II Asen.
1256		Michael II Asen was killed. He was succeeded by Kaliman Asen II.
1256		Kaliman Asen II was killed. He was succeeded by Mitso Asen.
1257		Mitso Asen ended his rule. He was succeeded by Constantine I.
1277		Constantine I was killed in a battle.
1280		Ivaylo was killed by the Mongols after arriving at the Golden Horde.
1292		George I went to the Byzantine Empire.

== 14th century ==
Year	Date	Event
1323		Michael Shishman Bolyar of Vidin.
1330	28 July	Battle of Velbuzhd: the Serbians won the battle and the Serbians after the battle dominated Bulgaria.
1331		Ivan Stephen was disposed and went to Serbia.
1371	17 February	Ivan Alexander died.
1393		The capital of the Second Bulgarian Empire, Tarnovo, was captured by the Ottoman Empire.
1396		Bulgaria was invaded and conquered by the Turks.

== 15th century ==
Year	Date	Event
1422		The Vidin Tsardom, the last Bulgarian state, collapsed.
1443		Sofia was occupied by the Hungarian forces.
1493		Kremikovtsi Monastery was reconstructed.
1494		Buyuk Mosque was constructed.

== 16th century ==
Year	Date	Event
1528		The Sveti Sedmochislenitsi Church was constructed.
1576		Banya Bashi Mosque was constructed.
1598		The First Tarnovo uprising took place.

== 17th century ==
Year	Date	Event
1606		Cossacks sacked Varna.
1667		The first Bulgarian history (De antiquitate Paterni soli et de rebus Bulgaricis) was completed by Petar Bogdan.
1686		The Second Tarnovo uprising took place.
1688		Chiprovtsi uprising against Ottoman rule.
1689	October	Karposh's rebellion against Ottoman rule: Strahil Vojvoda captured Kriva Palanka.

== 18th century ==
Year	Date	Event
1737		Uprising against Ottoman rule in Sofia, Samokov and Western Bulgaria
1738		Great Plague of 1738: The plague affects Bulgaria.
1739		The Treaty of Belgrade was signed and Habsburg monarchy/Austrian Empire was no longer active against the Ottoman Empire for around a century.
1762		Istoriya Slavyanobolgarskaya completed, a book about Bulgarian history written by Paisius of Hilendar, which marked the beginning of the Bulgarian Revival.
1768		Russo-Turkish War (1768-1774)
1774	20 June	Battle of Kozludzha: The battle took place near Kozludzha, Bulgaria.
1774		The Treaty of Küçük Kaynarca gave Russia the right to interfere in Ottoman affairs to protect the Sultan's Christian subjects, including the Bulgarians.
1792		A book about the history of Bulgaria (Istoriya vo krattse o bolgarskom narode slovenskom) was written by Spiridon Gabrovski.

== 19th century ==
Year	Date	Event
1818		An earthquakes shakes up Sofia.
1821		A revolt began with the Greeks against the Ottomans.
1829		Forces owned by Russia occupy Sofia.
1834		The first Bulgarian factory opened.
1839-1876		Ottoman Tanzimat reforms
1853		Crimean War: British and French troops arrive in Bulgaria.
1870		A Bulgarian Exarchate is established.
1876		The major April Uprising is brutally suppressed, resulting in a public outcry in Europe.
1878	March	Russia and Turkey signed the Treaty of San Stefano.
1878	July	Treaty of Berlin was signed and split Bulgaria in three parts with different destiny.
1885-1886		The Principality of Bulgaria and Eastern Rumelia became united formalized with the Tophane Agreement.
1888		The University of Sofia was established (bears that name from 1904).

== 20th century ==
Year	Date	Event
1913	June	Greece and Serbia established a relationship with each other against Bulgaria.
1915	14 October	Bulgaria joined World War I and teamed up with Germany.
1918	30 September	Bulgaria surrendered in World War I.
1919	27 November	Treaty of Neuilly-sur-Seine: After it was signed at Neuilly-sur-Seine, France, Bulgaria gave away some of their territories
1920	28 March	An election took place.
1923	9 June	A coup d'état took place that resulted in the assassination of Aleksandar Stamboliyski.
1925	18 October	War of the stray dog: The war began with Greece.
1925	23 October	War of the stray dog: The war ended with Bulgarian victory.
1939		Bulgaria declared war on Britain, Yugoslavia, Greece, and the USA. Bulgaria left the war after the Soviet Union declared war on Bulgaria.
1944		Women earned the right to vote.
1948	27 December	Georgi Dimitrov became the leader of the communist party.
1947		Bulgaria and the Soviet Union signed a peace treaty.
1949	2 July	Georgi Dimitrov died and Valko Chervenkov became the new leader of the communist party.
1949	16 December	Death of Traicho Kostov.
1954	4 March	Todor Zhivkov became the leader of the communist party.
1955	14 May	The Warsaw Pact was signed.
1962		Yugov retired from the communist party.
1963		Pirin Macedonia was declared by Zhivkov as a part of Bulgaria.
1968		Zhivkov's loyalty was demonstrated to the Soviet Union.
1975	1 August	The Helsinki Accords was signed by Bulgaria, giving citizens more freedom.
1989	10 November	Communists in the government are replaced by democracy supporters.
1990	3 April	Bulgaria is no longer a communist state and was renamed to the Republic of Bulgaria.
1995		Zhan Videnov took office after the angry reactions against a reform on the economy.
1997		After the BSP government in Bulgaria fell, the UDF took its place.

== 21st century ==
Year	Date	Event
2001	17 June	Simeon II won in parliamentary elections.
2004	29 March	Bulgaria joins NATO.
2007	1 January	Bulgaria joins in the European Union.
2009		Recession of 2009 occurred.
2010		Bulgaria started to export goods to nations that didn't join the European Union.
2013	19 January	Oktay Enimehmedov attempted to launch a gas pistol at Ahmed Dogan who was the leader of the Turkish political party. After the gun wasn't successful at releasing a bullet, Enimehmedov was beaten up.
2013	14 September	Protesters crowded the streets near the parliament in Sofia, requesting the Socialist-led government to resign.
2014	1 January	Romanians and Bulgarians can work in the 28 European Union member states after the European Commission announced it.

== See also ==
- Bulgaria
- History of Bulgaria
- Timeline of Sofia
- Timeline of Plovdiv
- Timeline of Varna
- List of Bulgarian monarchs

Region	until 1918	1918– 1929	1929– 1945	1941– 1945	1945– 1946	1946– 1963	1963– 1992	1992– 2003	2003– 2006	2006– 2008	since 2008
Slovenia	Part of Austria-Hungary including the Bay of Kotor See also: Kingdom of Croatia-Slavonia (1868–1918) Kingdom of Dalmatia (1815–1918) Condominium of Bosnia and Herzegovina (1878–1918)	State of Slovenes, Croats and Serbs (1918) Kingdom of Serbs, Croats and Slovenes (1918–1929) Kingdom of Yugoslavia (1929–1943) See also: Republic of Prekmurje (1919) Banat, Bačka and Baranja (1918–1919) Free State of Fiume (1920–1924) (1924–1945) Italian province of Zadar (1920–1947)		Annexed by Italy, Germany, and Hungary^{a}	Democratic Federal Yugoslavia (1943–1945) Federal People's Republic of Yugoslavia (1945–1963) Socialist Federal Republic of Yugoslavia (1963–1992) Consisted of the Socialist Republics of: Slovenia (1945–1991); Croatia (1945–1991); Bosnia and Herzegovina (1945–1992) Serbia (1945–1992) (included the autonomous provinces of Vojvodina and Kosovo) Montenegro (1945–1992); Macedonia (1945–1991) See also: Free Territory of Trieste (1947–1954)^{h}			Republic of Slovenia; Ten-Day War			
Dalmatia	Part of Austria-Hungary including the Bay of Kotor See also: Kingdom of Croatia-Slavonia (1868–1918) Kingdom of Dalmatia (1815–1918) Condominium of Bosnia and Herzegovina (1878–1918)	State of Slovenes, Croats and Serbs (1918) Kingdom of Serbs, Croats and Slovenes (1918–1929) Kingdom of Yugoslavia (1929–1943) See also: Republic of Prekmurje (1919) Banat, Bačka and Baranja (1918–1919) Free State of Fiume (1920–1924) (1924–1945) Italian province of Zadar (1920–1947)		Independent State of Croatia (1941–1945) Puppet state of Germany. Parts annexed by Italy. Međimurje and Baranja annexed by Hungary.	Democratic Federal Yugoslavia (1943–1945) Federal People's Republic of Yugoslavia (1945–1963) Socialist Federal Republic of Yugoslavia (1963–1992) Consisted of the Socialist Republics of: Slovenia (1945–1991); Croatia (1945–1991); Bosnia and Herzegovina (1945–1992) Serbia (1945–1992) (included the autonomous provinces of Vojvodina and Kosovo) Montenegro (1945–1992); Macedonia (1945–1991) See also: Free Territory of Trieste (1947–1954)^{h}			Republic of Croatia^{b} Croatian War of Independence			
Slavonia	Part of Austria-Hungary including the Bay of Kotor See also: Kingdom of Croatia-Slavonia (1868–1918) Kingdom of Dalmatia (1815–1918) Condominium of Bosnia and Herzegovina (1878–1918)	State of Slovenes, Croats and Serbs (1918) Kingdom of Serbs, Croats and Slovenes (1918–1929) Kingdom of Yugoslavia (1929–1943) See also: Republic of Prekmurje (1919) Banat, Bačka and Baranja (1918–1919) Free State of Fiume (1920–1924) (1924–1945) Italian province of Zadar (1920–1947)		Independent State of Croatia (1941–1945) Puppet state of Germany. Parts annexed by Italy. Međimurje and Baranja annexed by Hungary.	Democratic Federal Yugoslavia (1943–1945) Federal People's Republic of Yugoslavia (1945–1963) Socialist Federal Republic of Yugoslavia (1963–1992) Consisted of the Socialist Republics of: Slovenia (1945–1991); Croatia (1945–1991); Bosnia and Herzegovina (1945–1992) Serbia (1945–1992) (included the autonomous provinces of Vojvodina and Kosovo) Montenegro (1945–1992); Macedonia (1945–1991) See also: Free Territory of Trieste (1947–1954)^{h}			Republic of Croatia^{b} Croatian War of Independence			
Croatia	Part of Austria-Hungary including the Bay of Kotor See also: Kingdom of Croatia-Slavonia (1868–1918) Kingdom of Dalmatia (1815–1918) Condominium of Bosnia and Herzegovina (1878–1918)	State of Slovenes, Croats and Serbs (1918) Kingdom of Serbs, Croats and Slovenes (1918–1929) Kingdom of Yugoslavia (1929–1943) See also: Republic of Prekmurje (1919) Banat, Bačka and Baranja (1918–1919) Free State of Fiume (1920–1924) (1924–1945) Italian province of Zadar (1920–1947)		Independent State of Croatia (1941–1945) Puppet state of Germany. Parts annexed by Italy. Međimurje and Baranja annexed by Hungary.	Democratic Federal Yugoslavia (1943–1945) Federal People's Republic of Yugoslavia (1945–1963) Socialist Federal Republic of Yugoslavia (1963–1992) Consisted of the Socialist Republics of: Slovenia (1945–1991); Croatia (1945–1991); Bosnia and Herzegovina (1945–1992) Serbia (1945–1992) (included the autonomous provinces of Vojvodina and Kosovo) Montenegro (1945–1992); Macedonia (1945–1991) See also: Free Territory of Trieste (1947–1954)^{h}			Republic of Croatia^{b} Croatian War of Independence			
Bosnia	Part of Austria-Hungary including the Bay of Kotor See also: Kingdom of Croatia-Slavonia (1868–1918) Kingdom of Dalmatia (1815–1918) Condominium of Bosnia and Herzegovina (1878–1918)	State of Slovenes, Croats and Serbs (1918) Kingdom of Serbs, Croats and Slovenes (1918–1929) Kingdom of Yugoslavia (1929–1943) See also: Republic of Prekmurje (1919) Banat, Bačka and Baranja (1918–1919) Free State of Fiume (1920–1924) (1924–1945) Italian province of Zadar (1920–1947)		Independent State of Croatia (1941–1945) Puppet state of Germany. Parts annexed by Italy. Međimurje and Baranja annexed by Hungary.	Democratic Federal Yugoslavia (1943–1945) Federal People's Republic of Yugoslavia (1945–1963) Socialist Federal Republic of Yugoslavia (1963–1992) Consisted of the Socialist Republics of: Slovenia (1945–1991); Croatia (1945–1991); Bosnia and Herzegovina (1945–1992) Serbia (1945–1992) (included the autonomous provinces of Vojvodina and Kosovo) Montenegro (1945–1992); Macedonia (1945–1991) See also: Free Territory of Trieste (1947–1954)^{h}			Bosnia and Herzegovina^{c} Bosnian War Consists of the Federation of Bosnia and Herzegovina (since 1995), Republika Srpska (since 1995), and Brčko District (since 2000).			
Herzegovina	Part of Austria-Hungary including the Bay of Kotor See also: Kingdom of Croatia-Slavonia (1868–1918) Kingdom of Dalmatia (1815–1918) Condominium of Bosnia and Herzegovina (1878–1918)	State of Slovenes, Croats and Serbs (1918) Kingdom of Serbs, Croats and Slovenes (1918–1929) Kingdom of Yugoslavia (1929–1943) See also: Republic of Prekmurje (1919) Banat, Bačka and Baranja (1918–1919) Free State of Fiume (1920–1924) (1924–1945) Italian province of Zadar (1920–1947)		Independent State of Croatia (1941–1945) Puppet state of Germany. Parts annexed by Italy. Međimurje and Baranja annexed by Hungary.	Democratic Federal Yugoslavia (1943–1945) Federal People's Republic of Yugoslavia (1945–1963) Socialist Federal Republic of Yugoslavia (1963–1992) Consisted of the Socialist Republics of: Slovenia (1945–1991); Croatia (1945–1991); Bosnia and Herzegovina (1945–1992) Serbia (1945–1992) (included the autonomous provinces of Vojvodina and Kosovo) Montenegro (1945–1992); Macedonia (1945–1991) See also: Free Territory of Trieste (1947–1954)^{h}			Bosnia and Herzegovina^{c} Bosnian War Consists of the Federation of Bosnia and Herzegovina (since 1995), Republika Srpska (since 1995), and Brčko District (since 2000).			
Vojvodina	Part of the Délvidék region of Hungary	State of Slovenes, Croats and Serbs (1918) Kingdom of Serbs, Croats and Slovenes (1918–1929) Kingdom of Yugoslavia (1929–1943) See also: Republic of Prekmurje (1919) Banat, Bačka and Baranja (1918–1919) Free State of Fiume (1920–1924) (1924–1945) Italian province of Zadar (1920–1947)		Autonomous Banat^{d} (part of the German; Territory of the Military Commander in Serbia)	Democratic Federal Yugoslavia (1943–1945) Federal People's Republic of Yugoslavia (1945–1963) Socialist Federal Republic of Yugoslavia (1963–1992) Consisted of the Socialist Republics of: Slovenia (1945–1991); Croatia (1945–1991); Bosnia and Herzegovina (1945–1992) Serbia (1945–1992) (included the autonomous provinces of Vojvodina and Kosovo) Montenegro (1945–1992); Macedonia (1945–1991) See also: Free Territory of Trieste (1947–1954)^{h}			Federal Republic of Yugoslavia Consisted of the Republic of Serbia (1992–2006) and Republic of Montenegro (1992–2006) Included Kosovo and Metohija, under UN administration, without control since 1999	State Union of Serbia and Montenegro Included Kosovo, under UN administration	Republic of Serbia Included the autonomous provinces of Vojvodina and Kosovo and Metohija under UN administration	Republic of Serbia Includes the autonomous province of Vojvodina; Kosovo claim
Central Serbia	Kingdom of Serbia (1882–1918)	State of Slovenes, Croats and Serbs (1918) Kingdom of Serbs, Croats and Slovenes (1918–1929) Kingdom of Yugoslavia (1929–1943) See also: Republic of Prekmurje (1919) Banat, Bačka and Baranja (1918–1919) Free State of Fiume (1920–1924) (1924–1945) Italian province of Zadar (1920–1947)		Territory of the Military Commander in Serbia (1941–1944) ^{e}	Democratic Federal Yugoslavia (1943–1945) Federal People's Republic of Yugoslavia (1945–1963) Socialist Federal Republic of Yugoslavia (1963–1992) Consisted of the Socialist Republics of: Slovenia (1945–1991); Croatia (1945–1991); Bosnia and Herzegovina (1945–1992) Serbia (1945–1992) (included the autonomous provinces of Vojvodina and Kosovo) Montenegro (1945–1992); Macedonia (1945–1991) See also: Free Territory of Trieste (1947–1954)^{h}			Federal Republic of Yugoslavia Consisted of the Republic of Serbia (1992–2006) and Republic of Montenegro (1992–2006) Included Kosovo and Metohija, under UN administration, without control since 1999	State Union of Serbia and Montenegro Included Kosovo, under UN administration	Republic of Serbia Included the autonomous provinces of Vojvodina and Kosovo and Metohija under UN administration	Republic of Serbia Includes the autonomous province of Vojvodina; Kosovo claim
Kosovo	Part of the Kingdom of Serbia (1912–1918)	State of Slovenes, Croats and Serbs (1918) Kingdom of Serbs, Croats and Slovenes (1918–1929) Kingdom of Yugoslavia (1929–1943) See also: Republic of Prekmurje (1919) Banat, Bačka and Baranja (1918–1919) Free State of Fiume (1920–1924) (1924–1945) Italian province of Zadar (1920–1947)		Mostly annexed by Italian Albania (1941–1944) along with western Macedonia and south-eastern Montenegro	Democratic Federal Yugoslavia (1943–1945) Federal People's Republic of Yugoslavia (1945–1963) Socialist Federal Republic of Yugoslavia (1963–1992) Consisted of the Socialist Republics of: Slovenia (1945–1991); Croatia (1945–1991); Bosnia and Herzegovina (1945–1992) Serbia (1945–1992) (included the autonomous provinces of Vojvodina and Kosovo) Montenegro (1945–1992); Macedonia (1945–1991) See also: Free Territory of Trieste (1947–1954)^{h}			Federal Republic of Yugoslavia Consisted of the Republic of Serbia (1992–2006) and Republic of Montenegro (1992–2006) Included Kosovo and Metohija, under UN administration, without control since 1999	State Union of Serbia and Montenegro Included Kosovo, under UN administration	Republic of Serbia Included the autonomous provinces of Vojvodina and Kosovo and Metohija under UN administration	Republic of Kosovo
Metohija	Kingdom of Montenegro (1910–1918) Metohija controlled by Austria-Hungary 1915–1918	State of Slovenes, Croats and Serbs (1918) Kingdom of Serbs, Croats and Slovenes (1918–1929) Kingdom of Yugoslavia (1929–1943) See also: Republic of Prekmurje (1919) Banat, Bačka and Baranja (1918–1919) Free State of Fiume (1920–1924) (1924–1945) Italian province of Zadar (1920–1947)		Mostly annexed by Italian Albania (1941–1944) along with western Macedonia and south-eastern Montenegro	Democratic Federal Yugoslavia (1943–1945) Federal People's Republic of Yugoslavia (1945–1963) Socialist Federal Republic of Yugoslavia (1963–1992) Consisted of the Socialist Republics of: Slovenia (1945–1991); Croatia (1945–1991); Bosnia and Herzegovina (1945–1992) Serbia (1945–1992) (included the autonomous provinces of Vojvodina and Kosovo) Montenegro (1945–1992); Macedonia (1945–1991) See also: Free Territory of Trieste (1947–1954)^{h}			Federal Republic of Yugoslavia Consisted of the Republic of Serbia (1992–2006) and Republic of Montenegro (1992–2006) Included Kosovo and Metohija, under UN administration, without control since 1999	State Union of Serbia and Montenegro Included Kosovo, under UN administration	Republic of Serbia Included the autonomous provinces of Vojvodina and Kosovo and Metohija under UN administration	Republic of Kosovo
Montenegro and Brda	Kingdom of Montenegro (1910–1918) Metohija controlled by Austria-Hungary 1915–1918	State of Slovenes, Croats and Serbs (1918) Kingdom of Serbs, Croats and Slovenes (1918–1929) Kingdom of Yugoslavia (1929–1943) See also: Republic of Prekmurje (1919) Banat, Bačka and Baranja (1918–1919) Free State of Fiume (1920–1924) (1924–1945) Italian province of Zadar (1920–1947)		Protectorate of Montenegro^{f} (1941–1944)	Democratic Federal Yugoslavia (1943–1945) Federal People's Republic of Yugoslavia (1945–1963) Socialist Federal Republic of Yugoslavia (1963–1992) Consisted of the Socialist Republics of: Slovenia (1945–1991); Croatia (1945–1991); Bosnia and Herzegovina (1945–1992) Serbia (1945–1992) (included the autonomous provinces of Vojvodina and Kosovo) Montenegro (1945–1992); Macedonia (1945–1991) See also: Free Territory of Trieste (1947–1954)^{h}			Federal Republic of Yugoslavia Consisted of the Republic of Serbia (1992–2006) and Republic of Montenegro (1992–2006) Included Kosovo and Metohija, under UN administration, without control since 1999	State Union of Serbia and Montenegro Included Kosovo, under UN administration	Montenegro	
Vardar Macedonia	Part of the Kingdom of Serbia (1912–1918)	State of Slovenes, Croats and Serbs (1918) Kingdom of Serbs, Croats and Slovenes (1918–1929) Kingdom of Yugoslavia (1929–1943) See also: Republic of Prekmurje (1919) Banat, Bačka and Baranja (1918–1919) Free State of Fiume (1920–1924) (1924–1945) Italian province of Zadar (1920–1947)		Annexed by the Kingdom of Bulgaria (1941–1944)	Democratic Federal Yugoslavia (1943–1945) Federal People's Republic of Yugoslavia (1945–1963) Socialist Federal Republic of Yugoslavia (1963–1992) Consisted of the Socialist Republics of: Slovenia (1945–1991); Croatia (1945–1991); Bosnia and Herzegovina (1945–1992) Serbia (1945–1992) (included the autonomous provinces of Vojvodina and Kosovo) Montenegro (1945–1992); Macedonia (1945–1991) See also: Free Territory of Trieste (1947–1954)^{h}			Republic of North Macedonia^{g}			
^{a} Prekmurje annexed by Hungary.; ^{b} See also: SAO Kninska Krajina (1990) → SAO Krajina (1990–1991); and SAO Eastern Slavonia, Baranja and Western Syrmia (1990–1991), SAO Western Slavonia (1990–1991) and the Republic of Serbian Krajina (1990–1995), all replaced by the UN Transitional Administration for Eastern Slavonia, Baranja and Western Sirmium (1996–1998).; ^{c} See also: Republic of Bosnia and Herzegovina; Croatian Republic of Herzeg-Bosnia; and the Serbian Autonomous Oblasts (SAOs) of Bosanska Krajina, North-East Bosnia, Romanija and Herzegovina (1991–1992), which all combined to form the Serbian Republic of Bosnia and Herzegovina (1992–1995).; ^{d} Bačka was reannexed by Hungary (1941–1944), while Syrmia was annexed by the Independent State of Croatia (1941–1944).; ^{e} Including North Kosovo. See also: Republic of Užice.; ^{f} Annexed by Italy (1941–1943) and Germany (1943–1944). Smaller part annexed by the Independent State of Croatia (1941–1944).; ^{g} North Macedonia's official and constitutional name was the Republic of Macedonia until 2019. It was known in the United Nations as the former Yugoslav Republic of Macedonia because of a naming dispute with Greece.; ^{h} Free Territory was established in 1947. Its administration was divided into two areas (Zone A) and (Zone B). Free Territory was de facto taken over by Italy and SFRY in 1954.
