= Balkan campaigns of Constantine V =

756–775 military campaigns

Campaigns of Constantine V
- Part of Byzantine–Bulgarian wars
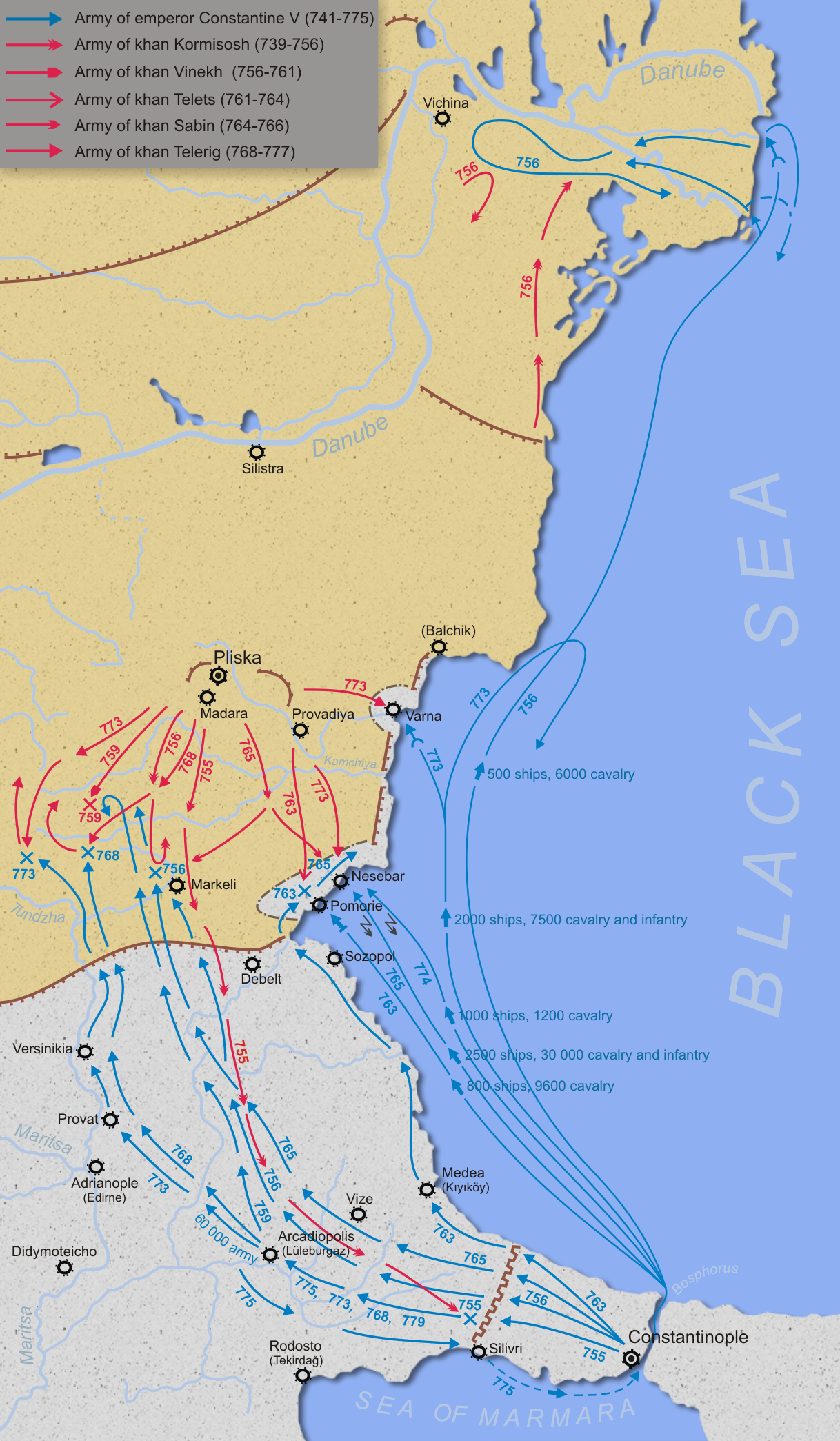
- Byzantine and Bulgarian routes during Constantine V's campaigns
Date	Early 756–775 September
Location	Balkans
Result	Inconclusive Full results: First Campaign (756): Byzantine victory; Second Campaign (759): Bulgarian victory; Third Campaign (763): Byzantine victory; Fourth Campaign (765): Indecisive; Fifth Campaign (768): Byzantine victory; Sixth Campaign (770): Byzantine victory; Seventh Campaign (773): Byzantine victory; Eighth Campaign (774): Byzantine; victory; Ninth Campaign (775): Inconclusive

Belligerents
Byzantine Empire; Sclaveni	First Bulgarian Empire; Sclaveni

Commanders and leaders
Constantine V # Leo the Khazar (Note: Leo was kept in Constantinople as a child regent during the early 750s to guarantee dynastic succession. However, as an adult in the 760s and 770s, he accompanied his father on the later overland land mobilizations, gaining critical field experience during major actions, including in Constantine V's seventh and ninth campaign.)	Telerig; Pagan X Toktu (executed); Umor (deposed); Sabin (deposed, fled); Telets (executed); Vinekh X Kormisosh (overthrown)

The Balkan campaigns of Constantine V were a prolonged series of large-scale military operations personally conducted by Emperor Constantine V r. (741–775) of the Byzantine Empire. With the objectives of the total destruction of the First Bulgarian Empire while resettling Slavic and Christian frontier refugees to migrate across imperial borders into Byzantine Thrace. The campaigns consequently triggered years of political crisis and saw the near collapse of the Bulgarian State which with the overthrow of seven khans in the span of two decades.

== Background ==
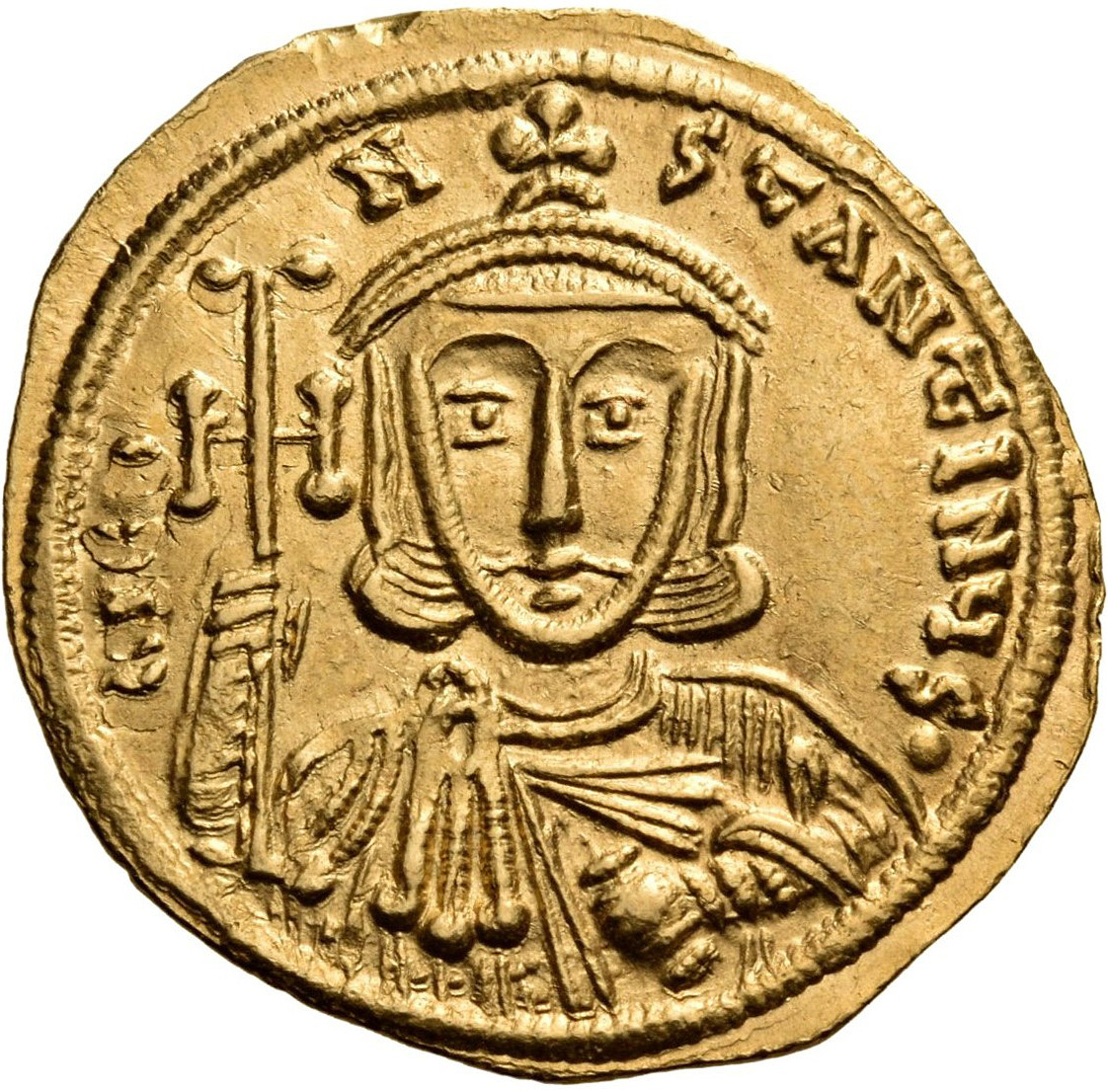
Solidus of Emperor Constantine V

Following the stabilization of the eastern frontiers after warfare with the Umayyad Caliphate, Emperor Constantine V directed his attention toward securing the vulnerable Balkan borderlands, which had been established with the Byzantine–Bulgarian treaty of 716. Beginning in 755, the emperor initiated a sweeping resettlement policy, transferring large populations of Christian Syriacs and Armenians to the devastated landscape of Thrace, in order to construct a comprehensive network of fortified border outposts.

The Bulgarian Khan Kormisosh viewed the sudden construction of these imperial fortresses as an existential threat to his southern boundaries. He dispatched an embassy to Constantinople, demanding the payment of a regular financial tribute to compensate for the new fortification layout. Constantine V rejected the terms, leading the Bulgarians to launch a massive retaliatory raid that plundered Thrace up to the Anastasian Wall. This prompted the emperor to organize a campaign aimed at the subjugation of the Bulgarian state.

== Campaigns ==
=== First Campaign (756) ===
In the initial imperial response to the Bulgarian incursions of the previous year, Constantine V launched a successful dual-front offensive. He personally led a thematic army overland into Thrace, while concurrently dispatching a fleet of 500 transport ships carrying elite cavalry up the Black Sea coast. The naval force landed near the Danube Delta, catching the Bulgarians completely unprepared. The combined pressure forced the new Bulgarian Khan Vinekh to abandon the frontier, as he suffered a tactical defeat at the Battle of Marcellae, signing a temporary peace treaty with the Byzantines.

=== Second Campaign (759) ===
Following a breach of the 756 treaty by the Bulgarian leadership, Constantine V mobilized another thematic force to launch a deep inland punitive expedition, directly targeting the Bulgarian heartland. However, while navigating the narrow and densely forested terrain of the eastern Haemus Mountains, the imperial vanguard was caught in an ambush at the Battle of the Rishki Pass. Recognizing the tactical vulnerability of his column, Constantine V executed a controlled retreat back to Thrace in order to avoid an open-field rout, postponing further expeditions for several seasons.

=== Third Campaign (763) ===
Constantine V deployed another dual-offensive against the Khan Telets, sending a massive fleet of 800 transport vessels carrying up to 9,600 cavalrymen up the Black Sea coast, in order to land near the Danube, while he personally marched the elite central tagmata overland into the coastal lowlands. On 30 June 763, the two sides collided at the Battle of Anchialus. Following an intensive day-long open-field cavalry engagement, the Byzantine army annihilated the Bulgarian lines, due to the betrayal of Telets' Slavic allies. The Byzantines took many high-ranking captives. Constantine V returned to the capital to celebrate a triumph, executing the prisoners in front of the Golden Gate.

=== Fourth Campaign (765) ===
Intended to capitalize directly on the political anarchy and civil war sparked in the Bulgarian capital of Pliska by the disaster at Anchialus, Constantine V ordered an unprecedented mobilization. He deployed a massive fleet of up to 2,600 transport ships to completely seal off the Danube river network and trap the remaining Bulgarian factions from the north. However, a catastrophic summer storm struck the western Black Sea, sinking nearly the entire imperial fleet in a single afternoon. Thousands of veteran horsemen and sailors drowned, forcing the emperor to abandon the offensive and return to Constantinople to manage the domestic financial and military fallout.

=== Fifth Campaign (768) ===
Constantine V launched a highly targeted rapid border-stabilization operation, in order to protect the newly resettled Syriac and Armenian populations in Thrace from the opportunistic frontier raids conducted by Khan Pagan. The emperor marched a compact, highly mobile force of central tagmata directly into the border zones, successfully engaging and dispersing several forward Bulgarian raiding columns. The swift counter-offensive neutralized the immediate threat to the imperial borders, driving the raiders back to the mountains, while triggering yet another internal coup in Pliska that resulted in Pagan's assassination by his own subjects.

=== Sixth Campaign (770) ===
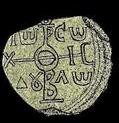
Seal of Khan Telerig

Following a brief lull in major hostilities, the newly elected and energetic Khan Telerig, began aggressively re-mobilizing the border tribes and forming strategic alliances with adjacent Slavic clans, rebuilding the Bulgarian offensive capabilities. Constantine V responded by taking immediate charge of the military and launching a proactive, multi-front invasion. The Byzantine armies successfully penetrated deep into the frontier borderlands, systematically burning local agricultural supply networks and disrupting the tribal coalitions, before Telerig could finalize his planned offensive into Macedonia.

=== Seventh Campaign (773) ===
After learning through court spies that Telerig had secretly dispatched a 12,000-man vanguard army to invade the region of Berzitia in Macedonia, the emperor feigned a naval mobilization towards the Danube to distract the khan. Once the Bulgarian army was deep in the open valleys, Constantine V personally led an elite force of 80,000 men in a forced night march, entirely catching the Bulgarians by surprise at the Battle of Lithosoria. The Bulgarian vanguard was routed, forcing Telerig to sue for a ceasefire.

=== Eighth Campaign (774) ===
After Telerig violated the newly signed ceasefire agreement, by attempting to purge pro-Byzantine collaborators and double agents within his own court, Constantine V personally took command of an overland invasion force, while simultaneously deploying a large secondary naval flotilla up the Black Sea coast. Although the land army successfully breached the mountain passes and plundered the surrounding plains of Moesia, the naval fleet was heavily battered by severe northern winds near the Danube Delta, forcing the emperor to conclude a hasty truce and pull his troops back across the border.

=== Ninth Campaign (775) ===
In 775, Telerig contacted Constantine, claiming to flee for sanctuary. He asked for the names of Byzantine agents within his county, of which Constantine revealed the identities of. The Byzantine spy network was then promptly eliminated, which caused Constantine to retaliate on a new campaign against the Bulgarians, with the explicit strategic goal of conquering and annexing the state. In August 775, the emperor mobilized his forces and launched a multi-front land invasion into the northern frontiers. However, during the grueling march through the rugged border terrain, the aging emperor contracted carbuncle, a violent fever and painful inflammation in his legs. Incapable of riding his horse or leading his troops, his inner circle was forced to halt the entire offensive. Seeing this, his retinue desperately rushed nearby coastal waters and loaded him onto an imperial vessel to quickly sail back to Constantinople for urgent medical help. However by the time they reached the port of Strongylon (just outside the walls of Constantinople), the emperor had already succumbed to the illness on board the vessel in September 14 775, bringing a sudden permanent end to the multi-decade offensive.

== Aftermath ==
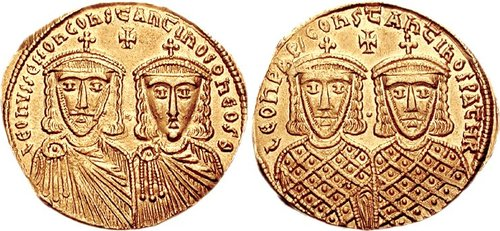
Solidus depicting Emperors Leo IV and Constantine VI, paralleling them with the previous Leo III and Constantine V

The sudden death of Constantine V in September 775 completely transformed the geopolitical dynamic in the Balkans, providing the Bulgarians with a vital strategic reprieve. His son and successor, Leo IV, abandoned the aggressive offensive policies of his father, shifting the Byzantine military framework to a passive, defensive stance along the Thracian border.

According to the chronicler Theophanes the Confessor, the veteran soldiers (specifically the imperial tagmata veterans) chanted the following words at the funeral of the emperor:

You lived victorious, you died victorious.

Immediately after the chant, the solemn burial was finalized within the imperial mausoleum at the Church of the Holy Apostles.

However, the deep adoration of the military for their late commander created long-lasting political friction. For decades after his death, whenever the Byzantine empire faced military defeats or foreign invasions, crowds of desperate citizens and veterans would gather outside his tomb to pray, symbolically calling upon Constantine V to rise from the dead and lead them to victory once more.

Within the Bulgarian capital of Pliska, the immediate aftermath was marked by the final gasps of the decades-long civil war. In 777, Telerig found himself cornered by rival aristocratic factions. Recognizing his imminent overthrow, he executed a final political maneuver by fleeing directly to Constantinople to seek asylum. Leo IV welcomed the exiled khan, converted him to Christianity, and married him into the high imperial aristocracy.

The departure of Telerig cleared the path for the ascension of Khan Kardam, who finally succeeded in crushing the pro-Byzantine factions and stabilizing the domestic political infrastructure of the state. By leveraging the breathing room granted by Leo IV's passive border policies, Kardam successfully rebuilt the shattered Bulgarian military baseline. This successful restructuring effectively ensured that the Balkan frontier crisis remained unresolved, directly laying the operational groundwork for the rapid 9th-century Bulgarian resurgence under Khan Krum.

== Bibliography ==
- Bury, John Bagnell (1923). The Cambridge Medieval History. Vol. IV. Cambridge University Press. ISBN 978-1456581633.
- Curta, Florin (2006). Southeastern Europe in the Middle Ages, 500–1250. Cambridge University Press. ISBN 978-0-521-81539-0.
- The Chronicle of Theophanes Confessor. Byzantine and Near Eastern History AD 284-813 (PDF). Translated by Cyril, Mango; Scott, Roger. Clarendon Press. 1997. ISBN 0-19-822568-7.
- Fine, John V. A. Jr. (1991). The Early Medieval Balkans: A Critical Survey from the Sixth to the Late Twelfth Century. University of Michigan Press. ISBN 978-0-472-08149-3.
- Jenkins, Romilly (1966). Byzantium: The Imperial Centuries, AD 610–1071. Weidenfeld & Nicolson. ISBN 978-1299745629.
- Haldon, John (1999). Warfare, State and Society in the Byzantine World, 565-1204. Psychology Press. ISBN 9781857284959.
- Ostrogorsky, George (1969). History of the Byzantine State. Rutgers University Press. ISBN 978-0-8135-0599-2.
- Shepard, Jonathan (2008). The Cambridge History of the Byzantine Empire c. 500–1492. Cambridge University Press. ISBN 978-0-521-83208-3.
- Treadgold, Warren (1997). A History of the Byzantine State and Society. Stanford University Press. ISBN 978-0-8047-2630-6.
- Whittow, Mark (1996). The Making of Byzantium, 600–1025. University of Michigan Press. ISBN 978-0-520-20496-6.
