= Asia Minor Slavs =

Historic ethnic group

The Asia Minor Slavs were the historical South Slavic communities that were relocated, usually forcibly, from the Balkan Peninsula to Asia Minor by the Byzantine Empire from the mid-600s onwards. Slavic population transfers cannot be viewed in separation from the resettlement of similar communities, hostile to Byzantine power, like the Paulicians, this time from Anatolia to the Balkans or the periodic reinforcement of the newly established Byzantine themata in Europe with Greek speakers from Italy, Asia Minor and the Aegean islands.

Bithynia and the Opsician Theme as of 842

These population transfers were designed to further the re-Byzantinisation of the Empire's Balkan holdings following the Slavic migrations by strengthening the Greek and diluting the Slavic element, while eliminating potentially hostile populations along its Anatolian border with the Arabs. Most Asia Minor Slavs were transferred to the historical region of Bithynia, which accounted for most of the early Byzantine theme of Opsikion, which was divided in the 750s into Opsician proper, Optimates and the Bucellarian Theme.

== History ==
=== 600s ===
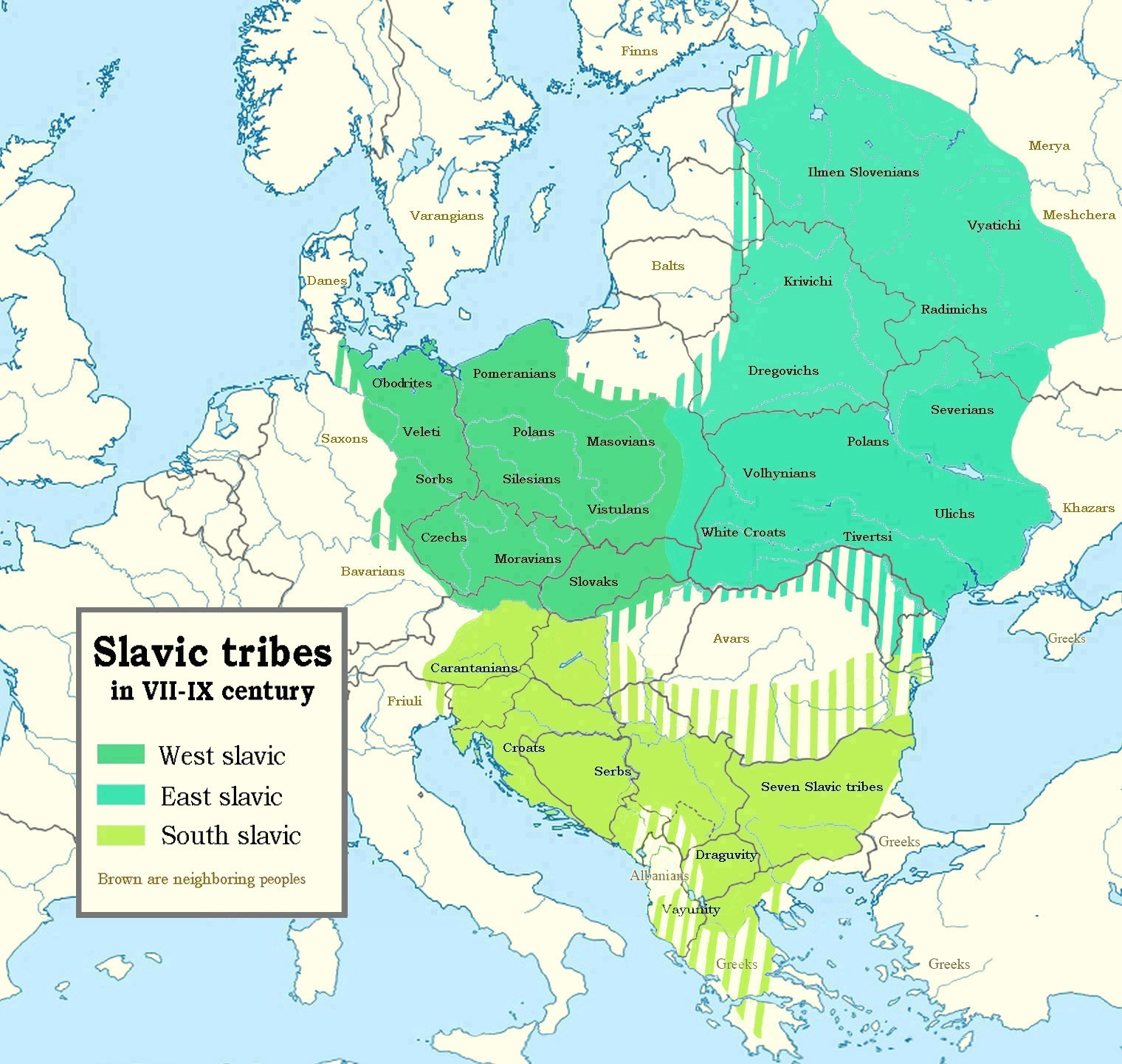
Slavic tribes from the 7th to 9th centuries AD in Europe

Constans II (r. 641–668) was the first Byzantine Emperor to launch a large-scale campaign of pacification against the Sklavinias in Macedonia, resulting in the resettlement of many captive Slavs to the region of Bithynia in northwestern Asia Minor. However, sources are inconclusive about the exact year of the campaign, with both 649 and 658–659 posited as possible. A lead seal found in Bithynia and dated to 650 points towards the former, or to at least several waves of resettlement. Whatever the exact year, a Slavic division of 5,000 men in Anatolia is recorded to have deserted to the Arabs under Abdulreman ibn Khalid in 664–665.

In this connection, Serbian authors, link the town of Gordoservon in Bithynia, which was mentioned in 680–81 and whose name possibly derives from the name "Serb", to Serbs resettled there from the areas "around the Vardar" by Constans II in the mid-7th century (in c. 649 or 667).

The next large-scale Byzantine campaign did not come until Emperor Justinian II (r. 685–695), who marched across Western Thrace and Macedonia to Thessaloniki in 688–689 in order to "subjugate the Bulgars and the Sklavinias". The Bulgars in question were most likely those of Kuber, who had rebelled against the Avar Khaganate in the late 670s and settled with a mixed population of some 70,000 Bulgars, Avars, Slavs and Byzantine Christians (cf. Sermesianoi) first in the plains around Thessaloniki and then in Pelagonia.

Justinian relocated 30,000 captured Slavs (or, alternatively, 30,000 men of military age) from the coastal plains of Thrace and Macedonia to the theme of Opsikion in Bitynia in an attempt to boost Byzantine military strength in Anatolia. However, most of the Slavs, led by their leader Neboulos, deserted yet again to the Umayyad Caliphate at the Battle of Sebastopolis in 692, eventually settling in Syria.

=== 700s ===
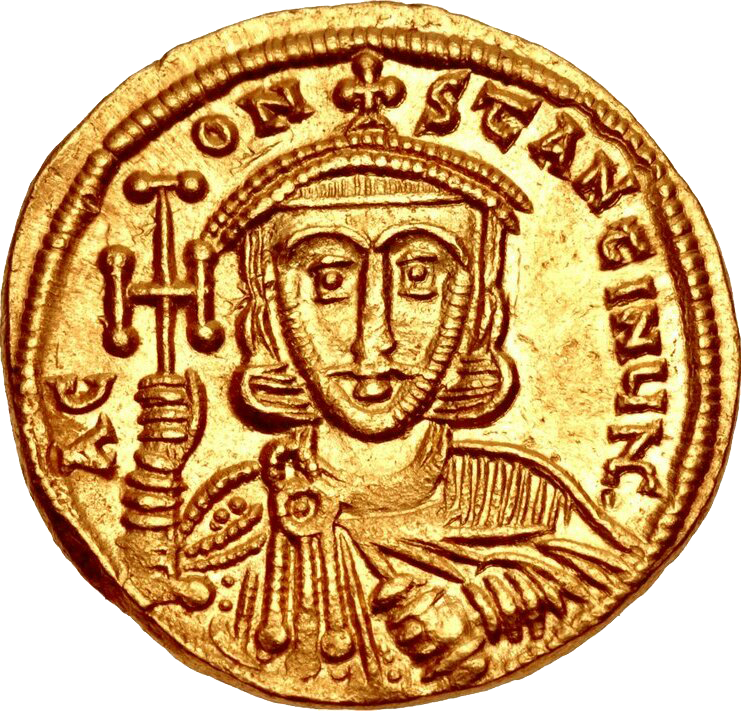
A solidus of Emperor Constantine V, whose rule saw the greatest resettlement of Slavs to Bithynia

The establishment of the Bulgar State gave a strategic dimension to the Byzantine transfers of Slavs to Asia Minor throughout the 700s. Large numbers of Slavs were relocated, again to Bithynia, by Emperor Constantine V in 758 and Emperor Constantine VI in 783 out of fear that they would side with the Bulgars during an invasion.

However, the largest transfer of Slavs to Anatolia did not come by force but as a result of the migration of some 208,000 refugees from the Bulgarian frontier districts in 762, a figure that has been regarded as both truthful and exaggerated by modern scholars. In 756, Emperor Constantine V built a series of fortifications along the border with Bulgaria, settling Syrian and Armenian schismatics in the border districts.

This led to a series of nine consecutive wars between the Byzantines and the Bulgars, causing upheaval and internal strife among the Bulgar nobility, which was split into a "pro-war" and a "pro-peace" faction, with five Bulgarian khans violently deposed within less than a decade (Telets, Sabin, Umor, Toktu and Pagan). The migration of 762 happened under the "pro-war" Khan Telets. Fine posits that the refugees were probably a mixed group of people, including Bulgars, and may have also been motivated by auxiliary factors, such as famine.

=== 800s ===
With the reestablishment of Byzantine rule in Thessaly, Epirus, Peloponnese and Chalkidiki and Bulgarian expansion across much of the former Diocese of Thrace and the northern part of the Diocese of Macedonia, combined with the complete Slavicisation of the Turkic-speaking Bulgars, Slavic population transfers were discontinued: Slavs under Byzantine rule were gradually hellenised, while those under Bulgarian one adopted a Bulgarian identity.

However, the large Slavic community in Asia Minor, especially in Bithynia, persisted. The most prominent among the Asia Minor Slavs was Thomas the Slav, a military commander who raised most of the empire in an unsuccessful revolt against Michael II the Amorian in the early 820s. Although the 10th-century chronicler Genesios calls him "Thomas from Lake Gouzourou, of Armenian race", most modern scholars support his Slavic descent and believe his birthplace to have been near Gaziura in the Pontus.

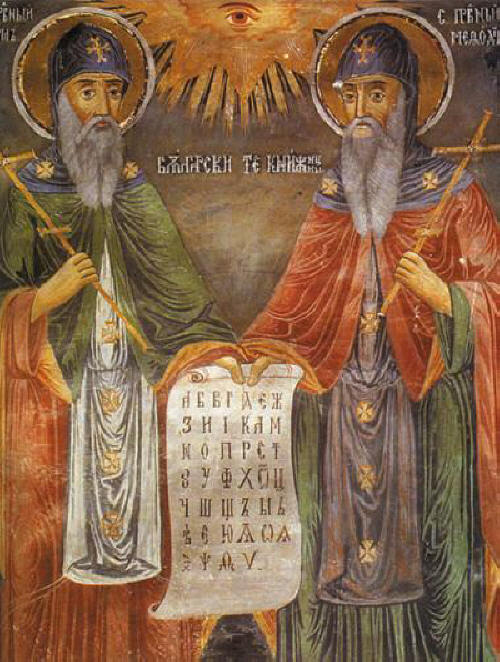
A 1848 mural of the Saints Cyril and Methodius in the Troyan Monastery

In 851, Saint Methodius of Thessaloniki became a monk at the Polychron Monastery in Bithynia, on the slope of the Asia Minor Olympus (today's Uludağ, near Bursa, Turkey), later becoming its abbot. In 855, he was joined there by his brother, Cyril. Several historians have posited that the Polychron Monastery was where the two brothers created the first Slavic alphabet, the Glagolitic, and started working on the Old Church Slavonic language based on the tongue of Eastern South Slavs living in the area.

=== 900s ===
The Slavs of the Opsician Theme (Sklabesianoi) are still attested as a separate group in the 10th century, serving as marines in the Byzantine navy.

=== 1000s and 1100s ===
After the unsuccessful Bulgarian uprising against Byzantine rule of 1072, a large number of Bulgarians were deported to Asia Minor, eventually settling in the Taurus Mountains and lending their name to a number of toponyms in the area, including the Bulgar Dagh mountain. In a similar manner, the Hungarian-supported Serbian uprising against the Byzantines in 1127–29 led to the forceful resettlement of part of the insurgent Serbian population to Asia Minor.

== See also ==
- Saqaliba
- Slavic migrations to the Balkans
- Anatolian Bulgarians
- Bulgarians in Turkey
- Serbs in Turkey
- Gallipoli Serbs
