= Ajjar of Bulgaria =

Ajjar or Ayyar (Bulgarian: Айяр), is the name assigned by the 17th century Volga Bulgar source Ja'far Tarikh (a work of disputed authenticity), to the successor of Tervel on the throne of Bulgaria.

The name Ajjar is otherwise completely unattested in the sources, but the Namelist of Bulgarian Rulers contains indications of two damaged records between the entries for Tervel and Sevar. The second of these is the Kormesios of the Byzantine sources, Kormesij. According to the Ja'far Tarikh, Ajjar was the brother and successor of Tarvil (i.e., Tervel), and the uncle and predecessor of Kermes (i.e., Kormesij). While this testimony cannot be corroborated, it provides a convenient name for one of the lost rulers of the "Namelist". Ajjar would have reigned in 715 according to the chronology developed by Moskov.

Preceded by Tervel	Khan of Bulgaria; 715	Succeeded by Kormesij
