= Battle of Anchialus =

The Battle of Anchialus refers to three battles between Bulgaria and the Byzantine Empire.

- Battle of Anchialus (708), where Bulgarian Khan Tervel routed the force of Byzantine emperor Justinian II and reaffirmed his right to the region of Zagora in present-day south-east Bulgaria.
- Battle of Anchialus (763), where Byzantine emperor Constantine V with 9000 cavalry defeated the Bulgarians under Telets. Telets was assassinated after the defeat.
- Battle of Achelous (917), took place near Anchialus. Simeon I of Bulgaria defeated a larger Byzantine army under Leo Phokas the Elder.
