= Umor of Bulgaria =

Khan of Bulgaria in 766

Umor Умор
- Khan of Bulgaria
- Reign: 766
- Predecessor: Sabin
- Successor: Toktu
- House: Ukil

Umor (Bulgarian: Умор) was the ruler of Bulgaria in 766.

According to the Namelist of Bulgarian Rulers, Umor reigned for only 40 days in 766 and belonged to the Ukil clan, which makes him a relative of the former rulers Vinekh and possibly Kormisosh. The Byzantine sources indicate that his predecessor Sabin entrusted Bulgaria to Umor, but give no details of his short reign or fate. Some scholars speculate that he was a champion of the peace party like his discredited predecessor, and that he may have likewise fled to the Byzantine Empire.

The 17th century Volga Bulgar compilation Ja'far Tarikh (a work of disputed authenticity) represents Yumart (i.e., Umor) as the elderly father-in-law of the former ruler Teles (i.e., Telets). According to this source Yumart deposed Sain (i.e., Sabin) and died shortly afterwards.

| Preceded by Sabin | King of Bulgaria; 766 | Succeeded by Toktu |
