= Battle of Thessalonica (1004) =

- Part of the Byzantine-Bulgarian wars
Date	Autumn of 1004
Location	near Thessaloníki, modern Greece
Result	Bulgarian victory

Belligerents
Bulgarian Empire	Byzantine Empire

Commanders and leaders
Samuil of Bulgaria	Ioannes Chaldus

Strength
Unknown	Unknown

Casualties and losses
Unknown	Unknown

The Battle of Thessalonica in 1004 was one of the many attacks of the Bulgarian emperor Samuel against the second most important Byzantine city in the Balkans, Thessalonica. Eight years earlier Samuel had defeated the governor of Thessalonica, Gregory Taronites. The attack in 1004 was undertaken immediately after the end of one of the regular campaigns of the Byzantine emperor Basil II into Bulgaria. Despite the Bulgarian defeat in the battle of Skopje, after the withdrawal of Basil II Samuel answered by invading the Byzantine dominions in turn. He ambushed the governor of Salonica John Chaldos near his city and captured him.

This chronology of events was presented by the historian Vasil Zlatarski. Other researches such as Srdjan Pirivatrich and Plamen Pavlov assume that Samuel's victory over Gregory Taronites was in 995, while the defeat of John Chaldos took place in 996.
