= Kardam of Bulgaria =

Khan of Bulgaria from 777 to 803

Kardam Кардам
- Khan of Bulgaria
- Reign: 777–803
- Predecessor: Telerig
- Successor: Krum
- Born: c. 735
- Died: 802 or 803

Kardam (Bulgarian: Кардам) was the ruler of the First Bulgarian Empire (777 – after 796/before 803).

== Life ==
The name of Kardam is first encountered in the Byzantine sources in 791, when Emperor Constantine VI embarked on an expedition against Bulgaria, in retaliation for Bulgarian incursions in the Struma valley since 789. Kardam pre-empted the Byzantine invasion and met the enemy near Adrianople in Thrace. The Byzantine army was defeated and turned to flight.

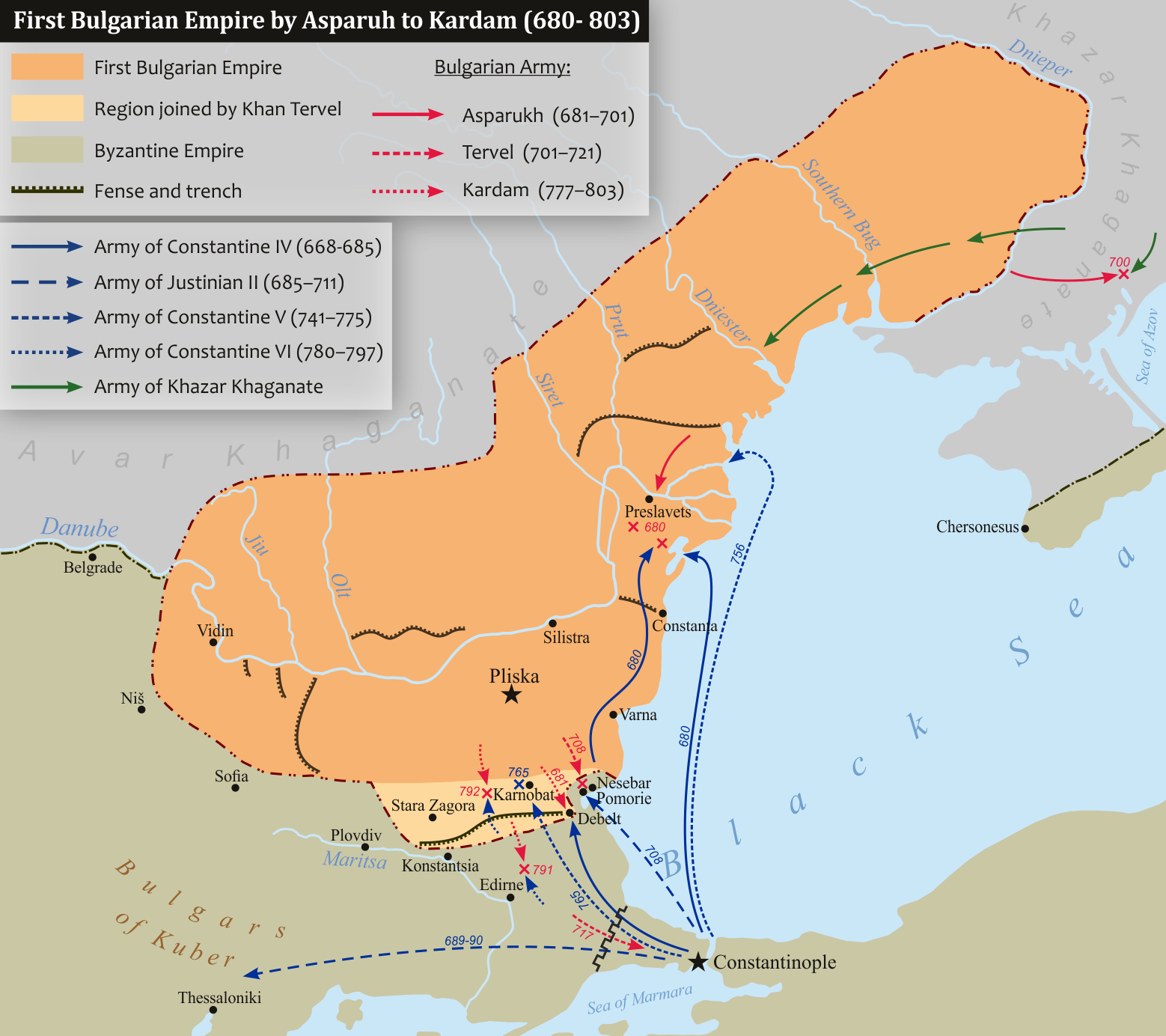
First Bulgarian Empire (680- 803). Shown are battles of Kardam

In 792 Constantine VI led another army against the Bulgarians and encamped at Marcellae (near Karnobat), which he proceeded to fortify. Kardam arrived with his army on July 20 and occupied the neighboring heights. After some time passed with the two forces sizing up, Constantine VI gave in to the reassuring advice of a "false prophet" and ordered the attack. But the Byzantine forces lost formation and once again were defeated and turned to flight, while Kardam captured the imperial tent and the emperor's servants. After his return to Constantinople, Constantine VI signed a peace treaty and undertook to pay an annual tribute to Bulgaria.

By 796 the imperial government was recalcitrant and Kardam found it necessary to demand the tribute while threatening to devastate Thrace if it were not paid. According to the chronicler Theophanes the Confessor, Constantine VI mocked the demand by having dung sent instead of gold as "fitting tribute" and promising to lead a new army against the elderly Kardam at Marcellae. Once again the emperor headed north, and once again he encountered Kardam in the vicinity of Adrianople. The armies faced each other for 17 days without entering into battle, while the two monarchs probably engaged in negotiations. In the end conflict was averted and the peace resumed on the same terms as in 792.

The reign of Kardam represents the restoration of order in Bulgaria, which had suffered from a rapid turnover of rulers and had been repeatedly defeated by the Byzantines in the third quarter of the 8th century. Kardam not only stood his ground against Constantine VI (who was trying to emulate his much more successful grandfather and namesake Constantine V), but he may have succeeded in precipitating a crisis at the Byzantine court, where Constantine VI's repeated failures undermined the emperor's position and he was dethroned by his mother Irene in 797. Kardam probably did not long survive his opponent, as he is not heard of after 796 and was already dead in 803.

The 17th century Volga Bulgar compilation Cäğfär Taríxı (a work of disputed authenticity) represents Karadžam (i.e., Kardam) as the brother of Azan Tokta (i.e., Toktu), and as the grandson of Suvar (Sevar). The same source represents his successor Korym (i.e., Krum), as his nephew. If all this is correct, Kardam's accession signifies the final restoration of the Dulo clan, which would have retained the throne until the death of Roman in 997.

== Honour ==
Kardam Buttress on Livingston Island in the South Shetland Islands, Antarctica, and the villages Kardam (Dobrich Province) and Kardam (Targovishte Province), are named after Kardam.

== See also ==
- History of Bulgaria
- Bulgars

== Sources ==
- Mosko Moskov, Imennik na bălgarskite hanove (novo tălkuvane), Sofia 1988.
- Jordan Andreev, Ivan Lazarov, Plamen Pavlov, Koj koj e v srednovekovna Bălgarija, Sofia 1999.
- (primary source), Bahši Iman, Džagfar Tarihy, vol. III, Orenburg 1997.

Preceded by Telerig	Khan of Bulgaria; 777 – after 796	Succeeded by Krum
