= Avitohol =

Bulgar

Avitohol (153–353?) is the first name in the Nominalia of the Bulgarian khans. Little is known about him. According to the document he is from the Dulo clan and most probably was considered and respected as the forefather of the khans. Some researchers claim that Avitohol was identical with Attila the Hun who was succeeded by his son Ernak or Irnik (the second name mentioned in the Nominalia). Others suggests that Avitohol was a semi-legendary ruler who may have been either a descendant or an ancestor of Attila (see Dulo clan).

== Honours ==
Avitohol Point on Livingston Island in the South Shetland Islands, Antarctica is named "after the legendary Khan Avitohol listed in the 8th Century Nominalia of the Bulgarian Khans, who laid the foundations of the Bulgarian statehood in AD 165."

A super computer is named after Avitohol. It is managed by the Institute of Information and Communication Technologies from Bulgarian Academy of Sciences. The installation is below the Institute of Mathematics and Informatics.

== See also ==
- Nominalia of the Bulgarian khans
- Bulgars
- Huns
- Attila the Hun
