= Battle of Litosoria =

774 Byzantine–Bulgarian conflict

- Part of the Byzantine–Bulgarian wars
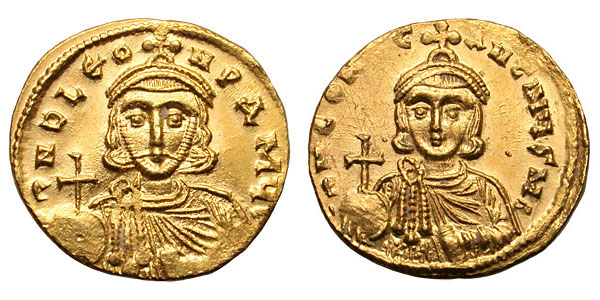
- Leo III the Isaurian, with Constantine V, AV Solidus. Constantinople mint.
Date	October 774
Location	Thracia
Result	Byzantine victory

Belligerents
Bulgaria	Byzantine Empire

Commanders and leaders
Telerig	Constantine V

Strength
12,000	60,000

Casualties and losses
Heavy	Heavy

The Battle of Litosoria or Lithosoria (Bulgarian: Битка при Литосория) occurred between the Bulgaria and the Buzantines in the fall of 774 at an unknown place named Litosoria. It was located in the border area between both states, in the region of Zagore, probably north of the line Kirklareli - Vize in modern Turkey. The result was a Byzantine victory.

After an unsuccessful campaign of the Byzantine Emperor Constantine V earlier that year, the Bulgarian Khan Telerig decided to strike back to the southwest and sent a small raiding army of 12,000 to capture Berzitia.

The Byzantine emperor was informed of the raid in due time by his spies in Pliska and gathered an enormous force. The Byzantines surprised the Bulgarian army, and after a long fight they managed to defeat them due to their greater superiority in the number of soldiers.

Constantine V was eager to follow up his success and led another campaign against the Bulgarians, but once again it failed. However, Telerig learned during this event that all his plans were known to Constantine through a network of spies within his government. He decided to eliminate them once and for all and sent a message to Constantine, stating that he was going to flee in exile to Constantinople. In exchange, Telerig asked the emperor to reveal the spies to his associates in Pliska for their own safety. As Telerig was not the first ruler to flee to Constantinople, Constantine revealed his information and sent the Bulgarian government the list of spies; however, Telerig deceived him and did not travel to Constantinople. When Telerig learned of their names, he executed them all and eliminated the Byzantine spy network within his government.

== Sources ==
- Florin Curta (31 August 2006). Southeastern Europe in the Middle Ages, 500-1250. Cambridge University Press. pp. 88–. ISBN 978-0-521-81539-0.
