= Polychron Monastery =

Monastery in Turkey

Polychron Monastery was a medieval Byzantine monastery in Bithynia founded in the 5th century. It is located on the slope of the Asia Minor Olympus (today's Uludağ, near Bursa, Turkey).

In 851, Saint Methodius of Thessaloniki came to the monastery, later becoming its head. After his mission to the Saracens, the same year Saint Constantine-Cyril the Philosopher also settled in the monastery. In this monastery in 855, on the basis of the developed Byzantine minuscule writing system, Cyril and Methodius created the first Slavic alphabet – the Glagolitic script.
