= Battle of Anchialus (763) =

Battle of the Byzantine-Bulgarian Wars

- Part of the Byzantine–Bulgarian wars
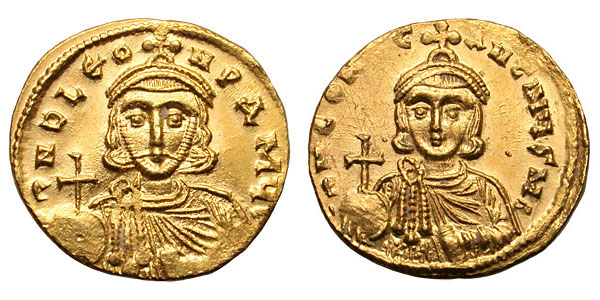
- Leo III the Isaurian, with Constantine V, AV Solidus. Constantinople mint
Date	30 June 763
Location	near Pomorie, Bulgaria 42°33′N 27°39′E
Result	Byzantine victory

Belligerents
Bulgarian Empire	Byzantine Empire

Commanders and leaders
Telets	Constantine V

Strength
Unknown number of Bulgars. 20,000 Slavic Warriors	9,600 cavalrymen & unknown infantry 800 ships

Casualties and losses
Devastating	Heavy

The battle of Anchialus (Bulgarian: Битката при Анхиало) occurred in 763, near the town of Pomorie on the Bulgarian Black Sea Coast. The result was a Byzantine victory.

== Origins of the conflict ==
After the success in the battle of the Rishki Pass (759) the Bulgarian Khan Vinekh showed surprising inaction preferring instead to seek peace, an action which would cost him the throne and his life. The new ruler, Telets, was a firm supporter for further military actions against the Byzantines. With his heavy cavalry he looted the border regions of the Byzantine Empire and on 16 June 763, Constantine V came out of Constantinople with a large army and a fleet of 800 ships, with 12 cavalrymen on each.

== Battle ==
The energetic Bulgarian Khan barred the mountain passes and took advantageous positions on the heights near Anchialus, but his self-confidence and impatience incited him to go down to the lowlands and charge the enemy. The battle started at 10 in the morning and lasted until sunset. It was long and bloody, but in the end the Byzantines were victorious, although they lost many soldiers, nobles, and commanders. The Bulgarians also had heavy casualties and many were captured, while Telets managed to escape.

== Aftermath ==
Constantine V entered his capital in triumph and then killed the prisoners. The fate of Telets was similar: two years later he was murdered because of the defeat. The Byzantines failed to use the strategic advantage which they had and the prolonged wars in the 8th century ended in 792 at the Marcelae with a Bulgarian victory and reestablishment of the treaty of 718.

== Sources ==
- Nicephorus. Opuscula historia, pp. 69–70
