= Devingrad =

Medieval Fortress in Bulgaria

Devingrad (fortress)
- Bulgarian: Момина крепост Bulgarian: Девинград
- Veliko Tarnovo Province, Bulgaria
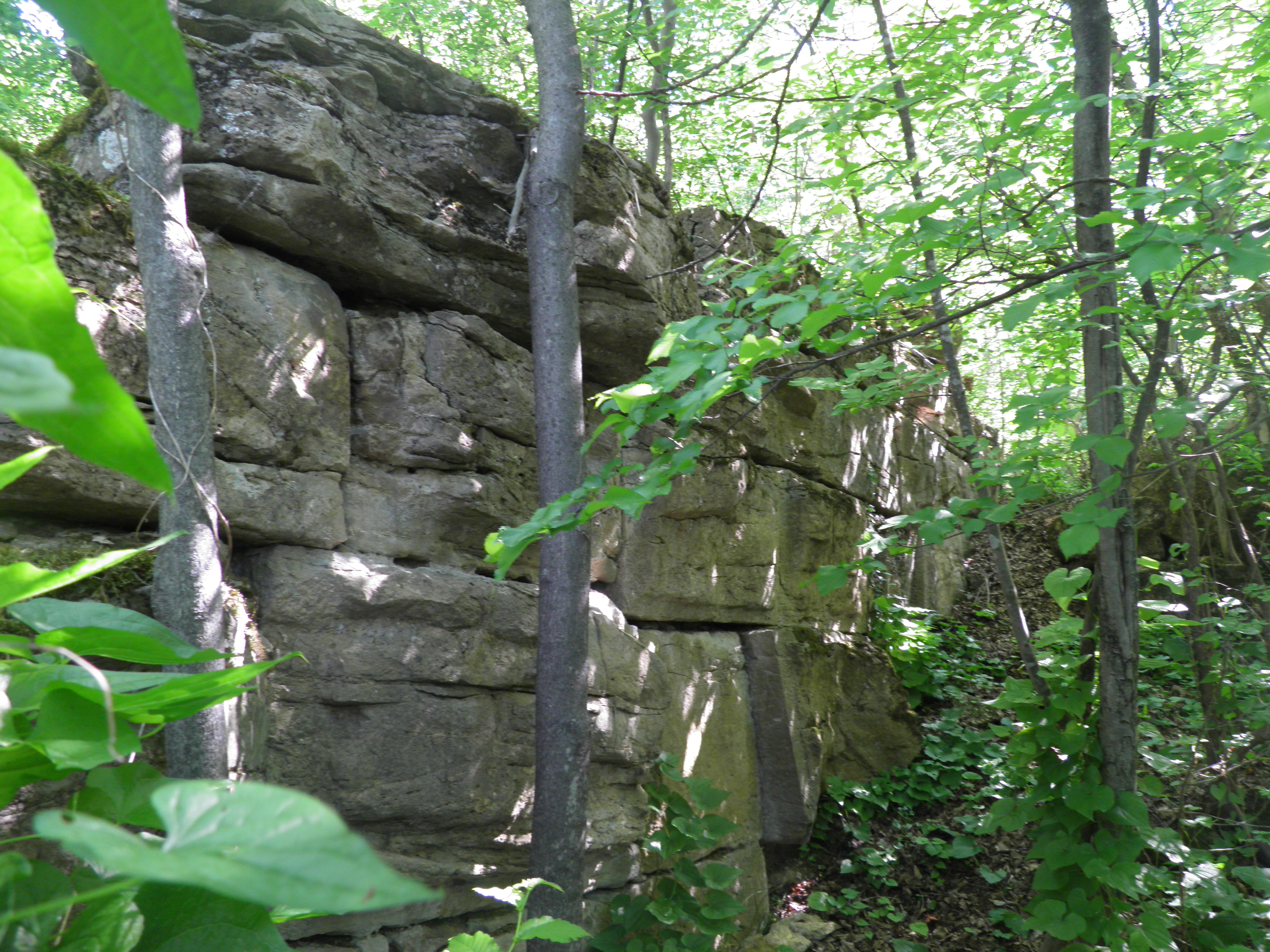
- Ruins of Devingrad

Site information
- Condition: In ruins

Location
- Location within Bulgaria
- Coordinates: 43°05′09″N 25°39′23″E

Site history
- Events: Byzantine–Bulgarian Wars

Momina krepost (Maiden’s Fortress) (Bulgarian: Момина крепост) also called Devingrad(Bulgarian: Девинград) is a medieval stronghold located on a hill with the same name in Veliko Tarnovo in northern Bulgaria. This hill was one from the three main hills when Medieval Tarnovgrad was the capital of the Second Bulgarian Empire (1185-1396 AD).

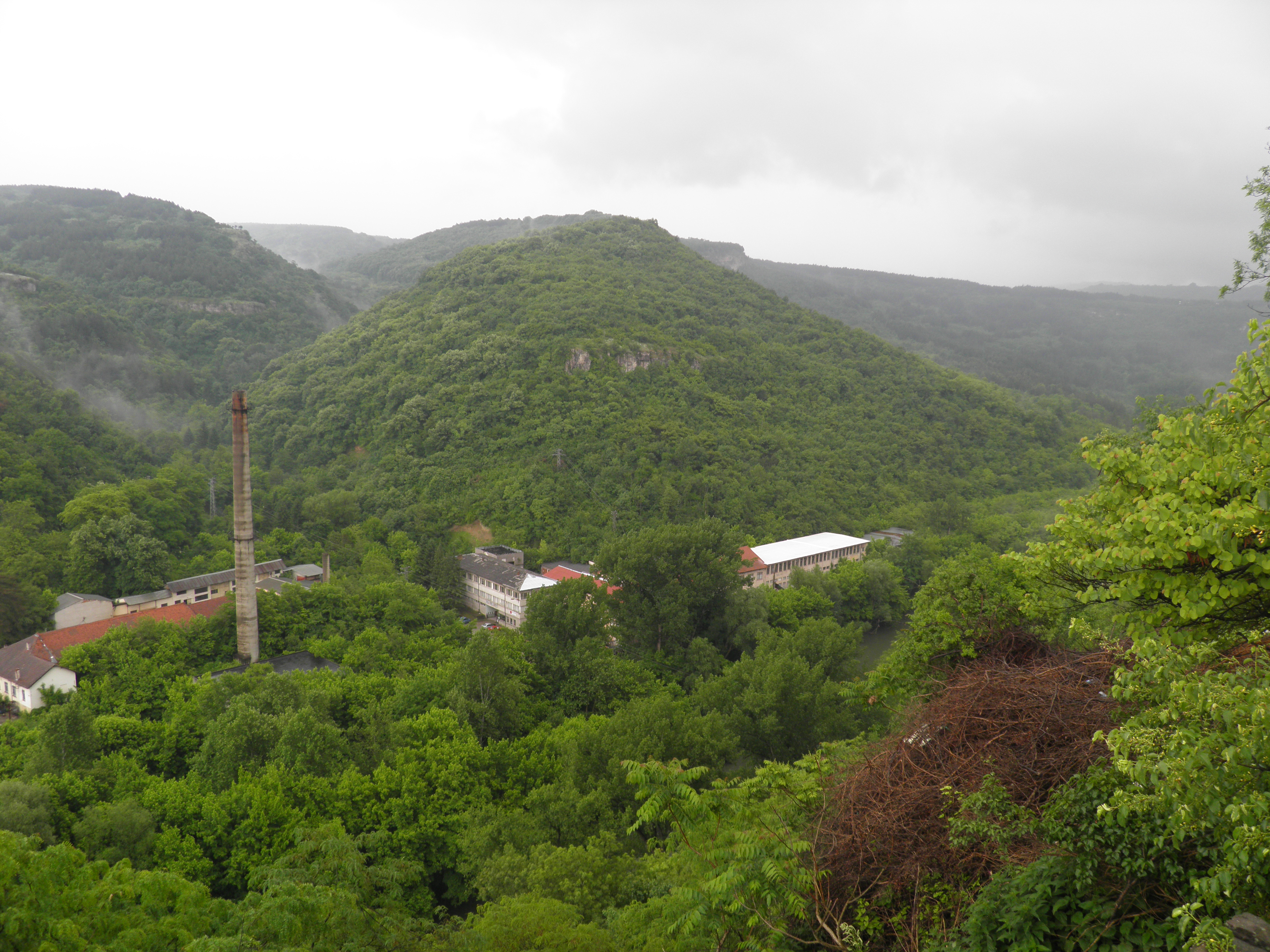
Hill Devingrad

== History ==
The hill at Momina Krepost was one of four hills of medieval Veliko Tarnovo, known as a stronghold since Byzantine times. Legends say that the side of the hill to the river Ether (Yantra) was heavily polluted by craftsmen in an area where cattlemen and farmers also lived.

== Complex ==
The stronghold was surrounded by a fortress wall and had two gates. Inside the hill there was few churches, necropolis, craft shops and housing.

== Archeology ==
The Czech-Bulgarian archaeologist Karel Skorpil and his brother Hermann Skorpil explored the hill at the end of the 19th century. On the hill were found citadel o about 300 meters long and 30-40 meters wide by Assist. Prof. Evgeni Dermendzhiev from the Veliko Tarnovo Regional Museum of History.
