= Telerig =

Khan of Bulgaria from 768 to 777

Telerig Телериг
- Khan of Bulgaria
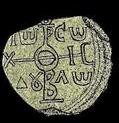
- Seal of Telerig
- Reign: 768–777
- Predecessor: Pagan
- Successor: Kardam
- Spouse: cousin of Irene of Athens

Telerig (Bulgarian: Телериг) was the ruler of Bulgaria from 768 to 777.

== Life ==
Although Telerig is first mentioned by Byzantine sources in 774, he is considered as the immediate successor of Pagan, who was murdered in 768. In May 774, Byzantine Emperor Constantine V embarked on a major expedition against Bulgaria, led his field army on land and dispatched a fleet of 2,000 ships carrying horsemen towards the Danube Delta. The fleet disembarked in the vicinity of Varna, but Constantine did not press his potential advantage and inexplicably retreated.

Shortly afterwards, both sides signed a truce promising the cessation of hostilities. However, in October 774, Telerig sent an army of 12,000 men to raid Berzitia, Macedonia, and transfer its population to Bulgaria. Collecting a large army of 80,000 troops, Constantine surprised the Bulgarians and won a resounding victory. The subsequent attack on Bulgaria failed since the imperial fleet had encountered contrary winds in the Black Sea.

Telerig then sent a secret emissary to Constantine that indicated his intention to flee Bulgaria and seek refuge with the emperor, and sought assurances of hospitality and a list of Byzantines who might help him. Thus Telerig succeeded in having Constantine betray his own agents in Bulgaria, who were duly rounded up and executed. The expected Byzantine retaliation failed to materialise, as Constantine died in 775. In spite of his apparent success, Telerig found it necessary to flee to the new Byzantine emperor, Leo IV the Khazar, in 777. The Byzantine government gave Telerig asylum and the title of patrikios. Telerig converted to Christianity under the name of Theophylaktos and married a cousin of Empress Irene of Athens.

The 17th-century Volga Bulgar compilation Ja'far Tarikh (a work of disputed authenticity) represents Dilyarek (Telerig) as the son of the former ruler Teles (Telets).

== Legacy ==
Telerig Nunatak, on Greenwich Island, in the South Shetland Islands, in Antarctica, is named after Telerig.

== In fiction ==
Telerikh is a major character in Harry Turtledove's "Islands in the Sea" (1989). The short story of alternate history originally appeared in Alternatives, edited by Robert Adams, and was reprinted in Departures and The Best Alternate History Stories of the Twentieth Century.

== See also ==
- History of Bulgaria
- Bulgars

== Sources ==
- Mosko Moskov, Imennik na bălgarskite hanove (novo tălkuvane), Sofia 1988.
- Jordan Andreev, Ivan Lazarov, Plamen Pavlov, Koj koj e v srednovekovna Bălgarija, Sofia 1999.
- (primary source), Bahshi Iman, Djagfar Tarihi, vol. III, Orenburg 1997.

Preceded by Pagan	Khan of Bulgaria; 768–777	Succeeded by Kardam
