= Daskal Philip Psalter =

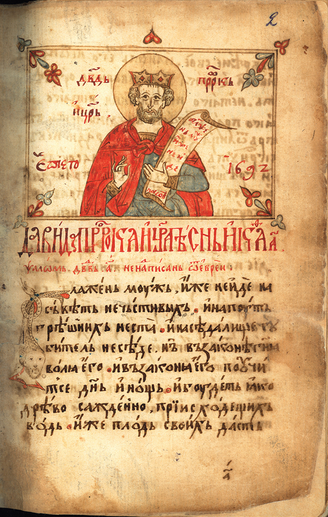
- Author: Daskal Philip
- Language: Bulgarian
- Publication date: 1692
- Media type: ink and illumination on parchment

The Daskal Philip Psalter (Bulgarian: Псалтир на даскал Филип, romanized: Psaltir na daskal Filip) is a 17th-century Bulgarian illuminated psalter. It was produced in 1692.

== Analysis ==
The psalter, is written in Middle Bulgarian Cyrillic and contains the text of the Psalms copied by the Bulgarian daskal (scholar) Philip. Of particular importance is the miniature of King David. The pages have dimensions 20.5×14 centimetres (8.1×5.5 in).

The manuscript is part of the collection of the Library of the University of Sofia "St. Clement of Ohrida" in Sofia.

== See also ==
- Sofia Psalter, c. 1337
- Tomić Psalter, c. 1360
- Gospels of Tsar Ivan Alexander, 1355–1356
