= Kaliman Asen II of Bulgaria =

Tsar of Bulgaria in 1256

Kaliman Asen II
- Tsar of Bulgaria
- Reign: 1256
- Predecessor: Michael Asen I
- Successor: Mitso Asen
- House: Asen dynasty
- Father: Alexander

Kaliman Asen II (Bulgarian: Калиман Асен II), or commonly, but less accurately Koloman Asen II, ruled as the emperor, or tsar of Bulgaria, for a short time in 1256. The year of his birth is unknown.

Kaliman Asen II was the son of sebastokrator Alexander, who was the younger brother of Ivan Asen II of Bulgaria. Kaliman Asen II's mother is unknown, and attempts to identify her as a Serbian princess are based on the erroneous identification of Kaliman Asen II with the sebastokrator Kaloyan, who was still alive in 1258/59.

In 1256 Kaliman Asen murdered his first cousin Michael Asen I during a hunting party in the environs of the capital Tărnovo and usurped the throne. In the process he married Michael Asen I's widow, the unnamed daughter of Rostislav Mihailovich, but he was unable to maintain himself on the throne. Rostislav advanced on Tărnovo from Belgrade, and Kaliman Asen II fled the capital. Rostislav returned home with his daughter and claiming the title of emperor of Bulgaria, while a brother-in-law of Michael Asen I, Mitso Asen took the throne. In the meantime, Kaliman Asen II had been murdered after being abandoned by most of his supporters.

Preceded by Michael Asen I	Tsar of Bulgaria; 1256	Succeeded by Mitso Asen
