= Sabin of Bulgaria =

Khan of Bulgaria from 765 to 766

Sabin Сабин
- Khan of Bulgaria
- Reign: 765–766
- Predecessor: Telets
- Successor: Umor
- House: Vokil

Sabin (Bulgarian: Сабин) was the ruler of Bulgaria from 765 to 766.

Some scholars think that Sabin was omitted from the Namelist of Bulgarian Rulers because he was a Slav, but his name could indicate Latin or even Iranian origins. He was related by marriage to Kormisosh, who was either a father-in-law or a brother-in-law of Sabin. Since the relation is by marriage, Sabin would not have actually belonged to the Vokil (=Ukil?) clan.

Sabin rose to the throne after the murder of Telets in 765 and represented that part of the Bulgarian nobility which was seeking a policy of accommodation with the Byzantine Empire. Accordingly, he swiftly dispatched secret emissaries to Emperor Constantine V Kopronymos, who had recently defeated Sabin's predecessor Telets, seeking to re-establish peace. When the negotiations were discovered, the Bulgarians rebelled and held an assembly, in which they accused Sabin of causing Bulgaria's enslavement by the Byzantines.

Deserted by his supporters, Sabin fled to Byzantine Mesembria (Nesebăr) in 766, from whence he went to Constantinople. There he was received by the emperor, who arranged for the transfer of Sabin's family from Bulgaria. In 768 Sabin attended Constantine V's negotiations with a new Bulgarian ruler, Pagan, but the emperor's words on behalf of the former monarch made little impression. Sabin passed the remainder of his life in exile.

Sabin Point in Antarctica is named after Sabin of Bulgaria.

Preceded by Telets	Khan of Bulgaria; 765–766	Succeeded by Umor
