= Siege of Varna (1201) =

- Part of the Byzantine–Bulgarian wars
Date	21–24 March 1201
Location	Varna, today Republic of Bulgaria 43°12′28″N 27°55′01″E
Result	Bulgarian victory

Belligerents
Bulgarian Empire	Byzantine Empire

Commanders and leaders
Kaloyan	
- Location within Bulgaria Siege of Varna (1201) (Black Sea)

The siege of Varna (Bulgarian: Обсада на Варна) took place between 21 and 24 March 1201 at Varna, on the Bulgarian Black Sea coast between the Bulgarians and the Byzantines. The Bulgarians were victorious and captured the city, which led to the massacre of Byzantine prisoners as a revenge for the Battle of Klyuch.

== Prelude ==
After the youngest of the three Asen brothers, Kaloyan, was crowned Emperor in early 1197 he immediately showed his resolution to continue the war with the Byzantines by all means and liberate all Bulgarian lands. In the next year Kaloyan even allied with Ivanko, the murderer of his eldest brother, Ivan Asen.

== The siege ==
At the turn of the new century, he seized the strong castle of Constancia (near modern Simeonovgrad) and then struck in the opposite direction and besieged the last Byzantine stronghold to the north of the Balkan Mountains, Varna. Varna was defended by a large garrison including western mercenaries who were known to be the bravest soldiers in the Byzantine army. To take the fortress the Bulgarian engineers constructed an enormous siege tower which was wider that the outer moat. With the help of the siege equipment the Bulgarian army was able to cross the moat and reach the walls of the city and on the third day of the siege, on 24 March 1201 the Bulgarians made a breakthrough. According to the Byzantine historian, Niketas Choniates, Kaloyan did not hesitate to kill all defenders despite the fact that it was Easter. The Byzantines were thrown in the moat and buried alive. According to George Acropolites, this action was revenge for the 14,000 Bulgarian prisoners of war blinded by Emperor Basil II "the Bulgar Slayer" after the Battle of Klyuch in 1014, when the Bulgarian tsar Samuil was defeated. The killings earned Kaloyan the moniker "the Roman Slayer". After that he destroyed the city walls and returned to the capital Tarnovo.

== Aftermath ==
By the end of the year Bulgaria and Byzantium started negotiation which ended with a peace treaty in the beginning of 1202. The Bulgarians secured their new gains and now were able to face the Hungarian threat to the north-west. After several battle in the valley of the Morava river, the Hungarians were defeated.
