= Toktu of Bulgaria =

Khan of Bulgaria from 766 to 767

Toktu Токту
- Khan of Bulgaria
- Reign: 766–767
- Predecessor: Umor of Bulgaria
- Successor: Pagan of Bulgaria
- Died: 767
- House: Ugain
- Father: Kermek

Toktu (Bulgarian: Токту) was the ruler of Bulgaria between 766 and 767.

The Byzantine chronicler, Patriarch Nikephoros, records that Toktu was "a Bulgarian, and a brother of Bayan". Although this suggests that Bayan was a man of some importance, nothing more is definitely known about Toktu's basis of support. Toktu is assumed to have been a member of that faction of the Bulgarian nobility which advocated a hostile policy towards the Byzantine Empire. However, before Toktu managed to implement any recorded policy, he was faced with a rebellion and attempted to flee the country. Unlike his predecessor Sabin, Toktu tried to flee northwards, but was caught and killed together with his brother Bayan and their supporters near the Danube.

The 17th century Volga Bulgar compilation Cäğfär Taríxı (a work of disputed authenticity) represents Azan Tokta (i.e., Toktu) as the son of the otherwise unattested Kermek, who was a son of the former Bulgarian monarch Suvar (i.e., Sevar of Bulgaria).

== See also ==
- History of Bulgaria
- Bulgarians

== Sources ==
- Mosko Moskov, Imennik na bălgarskite hanove (novo tălkuvane). Sofia, 1988.
- Jordan Andreev, Ivan Lazarov, Plamen Pavlov, Koj koj e v srednovekovna Bălgarija. Sofia, 1999.
- (primary source), Bahši Iman, Džagfar Tarihy, vol. III, Orenburg 1997.

Preceded by Umor	Khan of Bulgaria; 766–767	Succeeded by Pagan
