= Vokil =

Bulgar dynastic clan

Vokil, or Uokil, was a name of Bulgar dynastic clan of the early period of the First Bulgarian Empire listed in the Nominalia of the Bulgarian khans. The first listed in Nominalia was Kormisosh (r. 737–754) and the last was Umor (r. 766).

== Theories regarding origins ==
Kazakhstanian Turkologist Yury Zuev had drawn attention to circumstantial evidence suggesting links between the Vokil and various Central Asian peoples, during antiquity and the early Middle Ages. The peoples concerned include:

- the Hūjiē (呼揭) or Wūjiē (烏揭), whom Zuev believed to have been an offshoot of the Yuezhi or Wusun;
- the Xījiē (奚結), a Tiele tribe.
- the Augaloi of the Transoxiana region beyond the Oxus, among the Indo-European-speaking Tocharii;

However, such theories are controversial and cannot be all true. Conclusive evidence proving or disproving them has never been presented and there is no consensus amongst scholars on whether or not such links exist.

=== Yuezhi and Wusun ===
Yuezhi and Wusun are Chinese exonyms for two separate Indo-European peoples, who lived in western China and Central Asia, during ancient times. Before the end of the 4th Century BCE, the Yuezhi and Wusun were located in areas that were later part of the Chinese provinces of Gansu and Xinjiang. There was substantial interaction between the Yuezhi, the Wusun and a neighbouring people, the Xiongnu, whom many scholars have suggested were precursors of the Huns.

In about 200 BCE, the Xiongnu leader Modu Chanyu attacked the Yuezhi, and subjugated several other peoples. The Yuezhi subsequently attacked the Wusun, in about 173 BC, and killing their king, Nandoumi (Chinese: 難兜靡). According to a Wusun legend, Nandoumi's infant son Liejiaomi was left in the wild, but was miraculously saved by a she-wolf, which allowed him to suckle, and ravens, which fed him meat. This pivotal myth shared similarities with the founding myths of many other peoples in Central Asia. It has been, in particular, the basis of theories that the Ashina – the royal clan of the Göktürk Turks – originated amongst the Wusun. In 162 BC, the Yuezhi suffered a further, more decisive defeat at the hands of the Xiongnu and retreated from Gansu. According to Zhang Qian, the Yuezhi fragmented and most fled westward into the Ili river valley. The Wusun and Xiongnu later drove the main body of the Yuezhi southward, through Sogdia, into Bactria. The Wusun settled afterwards in Gansu, in the Wushui-he (Chinese: "Raven[-Black] Water River") valley, as vassals of the Xiongnu.

According to the Chinese chronicle Hanshu, in 49 BCE the Xiongnu ruler, Zhizhi defeated three small states. Zuev reads the names of these states as the Hujie (呼揭) or Wūjiē (烏揭), Jiankun (堅昆) (i.e. Kyrghyz) and Dingling (丁零). While other scholars have regarded the Hujie ~ Wujie as most likely an offshoot of the Wusun, Zuev considers it possible that they were a remnant of the Yuezhi. The Hanshu recorded that the 'Hujie retreated to the Lake Baikal area and the Great Khingan slopes (next to the Dingling). According to Zuev, the Hujie emigrated further westward, initially to the Aral Sea area, and may have joined the Yuezhi in their migration to Sogdia and Bactria.

=== Augaloi ===
In the 2nd century CE, Ptolemy (VI, 12, 4) wrote of the Lower Syr-Darya that near a northern section of the Amu Darya were the Iatioi and Tokharoi (Tukharas, i.e. Bactrians), and south of them were a people known as the Augaloi.

Yury Zuev postulated that the Augaloi mentioned by Ptolemy with the Ukil. However, a majority of scholars regard Augaloi as a misrendering of Sacaraucae.

=== Xijie ===
This name may be a sinicisation of igil, a Turkic root meaning "many" (Xijie < 奚結 γiei-kiet < igil). In the middle of the 7th century, the Xijie were reported to be located on the northern bank of the Kherlen River.

The text of an Old Uyghur funeral monument for Eletmish-Kagan (d. 759), referred to the Qara Igil bodun: a combination of the determinative qara ("blackness") and igil ("people"). (This name may also have suggested the influence of Manichaeanism, which had a "black and white" dualistic cosmology.)

In a 9th-century Yugur text, the Xijie were mentioned as having a strong leader named Igil kül-irkin (Old Tibetan Hi-kil-rkor-hir-kin), and were located next to the Iduq-kas, Iduq-qash, or Iduk-Az (OTib Hi-dog-kas), who may have been offshoot or successor of the Yuezhi or Alans or Turkicized Yeniseian speakers.

=== Oghuz connection ===
A circumstantial link between the Oghuz and the Bulgar Vokil is the naming of Verkil, a hero of the epic Kitab-i dedem Korkut.

== Sources ==
- Beckwith, Christopher I. (16 March 2009). Empires of the Silk Road: A History of Central Eurasia from the Bronze Age to the Present. Princeton University Press. ISBN 978-1-4008-2994-1.
- Enoki, K.; Koshelenko, G.A. [in Russian]; Haidary, Z. (1 January 1994). "The Yu'eh-chih and their migrations". In Harmatta, János (ed.). History of Civilizations of Central Asia: The Development of Sedentary and Nomadic Civilizations, 700 B. C. to A. D. 250 (PDF). Paris: UNESCO. pp. 171–191. ISBN 978-92-3-102846-5.
- François, Anthony; Hulsewé, Paulus Hulsewé (1 January 1979). China in Central Asia: The Early Stage: 125 BC - AD 23; an Annotated Transl. of Chapters 61 and 96 of the History of the Former Han Dynasty. With an Introd. by M.A.N.Loewe. Brill Archive. ISBN 9004058842.
- Sinor, Denis; Klyashtorny, S. G. (1 January 1996). "The Türk Empire". In Litvinsky, B. A. (ed.). History of Civilizations of Central Asia: The crossroads of civilizations, A.D. 250 to 750. UNESCO. pp. 327–346. ISBN 9231032119.
- Watson, Burton (1993). Records of the Grand Historian of China: Han Dynasty II (revised ed.). Columbia University Press. ISBN 978-0-231-08166-5. ISBN 978-0-231-08167-2 (pbk.) Translated from the Shiji of Sima Qian

== See also ==
- History of Bulgaria
- List of Bulgarian monarchs
- Bulgars
- Huns
- Oguz
- Xiongnu
