= Battle of Skopje =

Battle in 1004 near the Bulgarian city of Skopje

Coordinates: 42°00′N 21°26′E

- Part of the Byzantine conquest of Bulgaria
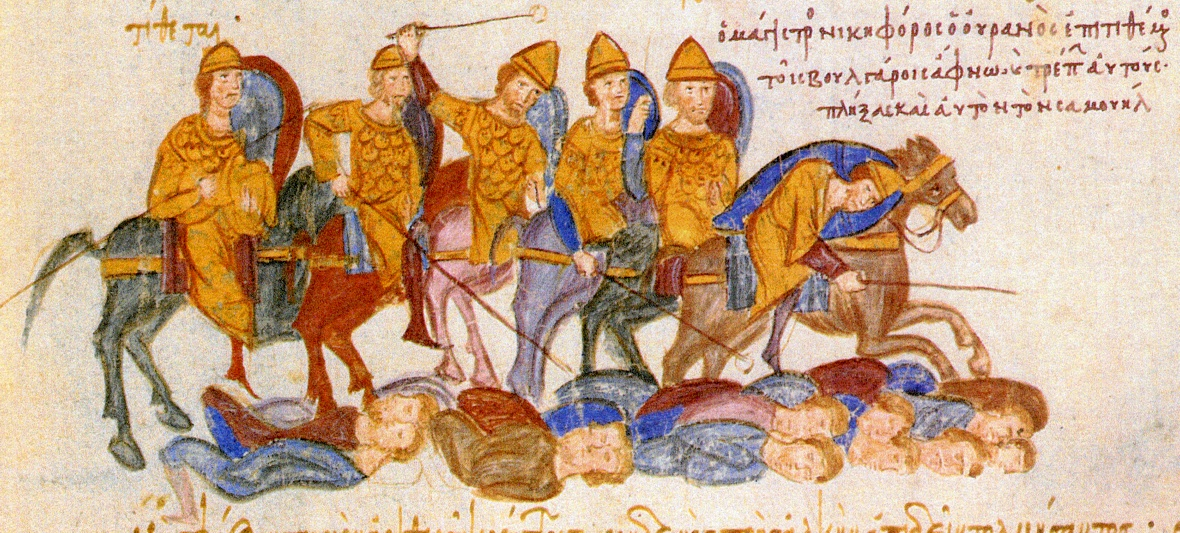
- Bulgarians put to flight by Ouranos at the Spercheios River from the Chronicle of John Skylitzes.
Date	1004
Location	Skopje, present-day North Macedonia
Result	Byzantine victory

Belligerents
Byzantine Empire	Bulgarian Empire

Commanders and leaders
Basil II	Samuel of Bulgaria

The Battle of Skopje was a battle in 1004 during the Byzantine reconquest of Bulgaria. The campaign was carried out in a slow and systematic manner, with campaigns sometimes continuing year-round rather than following the traditional seasonal pattern. The primary reason for mounting a long campaign was the realization by Basil II that Bulgaria could not be conquered in a single campaign. Instead the emperor chose to employ systematic and constant pressure, resulting in gaining control over crucial fortresses. He first secured Sardika (modern Sofia) and then advanced north to sever Samuil's access to the former Bulgarian heartlands around Preslav. Once this area was under control, Byzantine forces moved south from Sardika into Macedonia, capturing Berrhoia and reopening the route to Greece. Byzantine authority was soon restored in Thessaly and in parts of eastern Macedonia, including Voden. Basil then launched a major offensive northward toward the Danube, culminating in the capture of Vidin after an eight-month siege. During this time, Samuil personally led a raid through the reconquered territories and briefly seized Adrianople, which he plundered but was unable to hold.

== Background ==
In 1003, Basil II launched a campaign against the First Bulgarian Empire and after eight months of siege conquered the important town of Vidin to the north-west. Samuil launched raids deep into Byzantine territories but the attacks yielded no results and did not achieve any significant objectives. His warriors lacked the proper military equipment and he could not provide assistance to the besieged strongholds. In addition, the Magyars launched their raids into Bulgarian territories, further undermining Samuil's positions.

After seizing Vidin, Basil II marched southwards through the valley of the Morava destroying the Bulgarian castles on his way. Eventually, Basil II reached the vicinity of Skopje and learned that the camp of the Bulgarian army was situated very close on the other side of the Vardar river.

== Battle ==
Samuil of Bulgaria relied on the high waters of the river of Vardar and did not take any serious precautions to secure the camp. Strangely the circumstances were the same as at the battle of Spercheios seven years earlier, and the scenario of the fight was similar. The Byzantines managed to find a ford, crossed the river and attacked the heedless Bulgarians at night. Unable to resist effectively the Bulgarians soon retreated, leaving the camp and Samuil's tent in the hands of the Byzantines. During this battle Samuil managed to escape and headed east.

== Aftermath ==
Following the Byzantine victory, Romanos, appointed by Samuil as governor of Skopje, handed over the city to the emperor. By the end of 1004 Basil II had taken control of roughly half of Samuil's realm. With gains along the Danube in the north and in Thessaly to the south, the Byzantine position effectively placed Macedonia in a pincer. In 1005 Durazzo was returned to Byzantine authority through the defection of its commander Ashot. Throughout the conflict, similar episodes of betrayal occurred on both sides, with fortresses changing hands and individuals—including Greeks—defecting to Samuil's service. Following the surrender of Durazzo, the war continued for another decade, although the sources are silent on its details. It appears to have involved a gradual but persistent Byzantine advance westward, likely met with strong resistance.
