= Nominalia of the Bulgarian Khans =

Manuscript containing the names, clans, and reigns of early Bulgar rulers

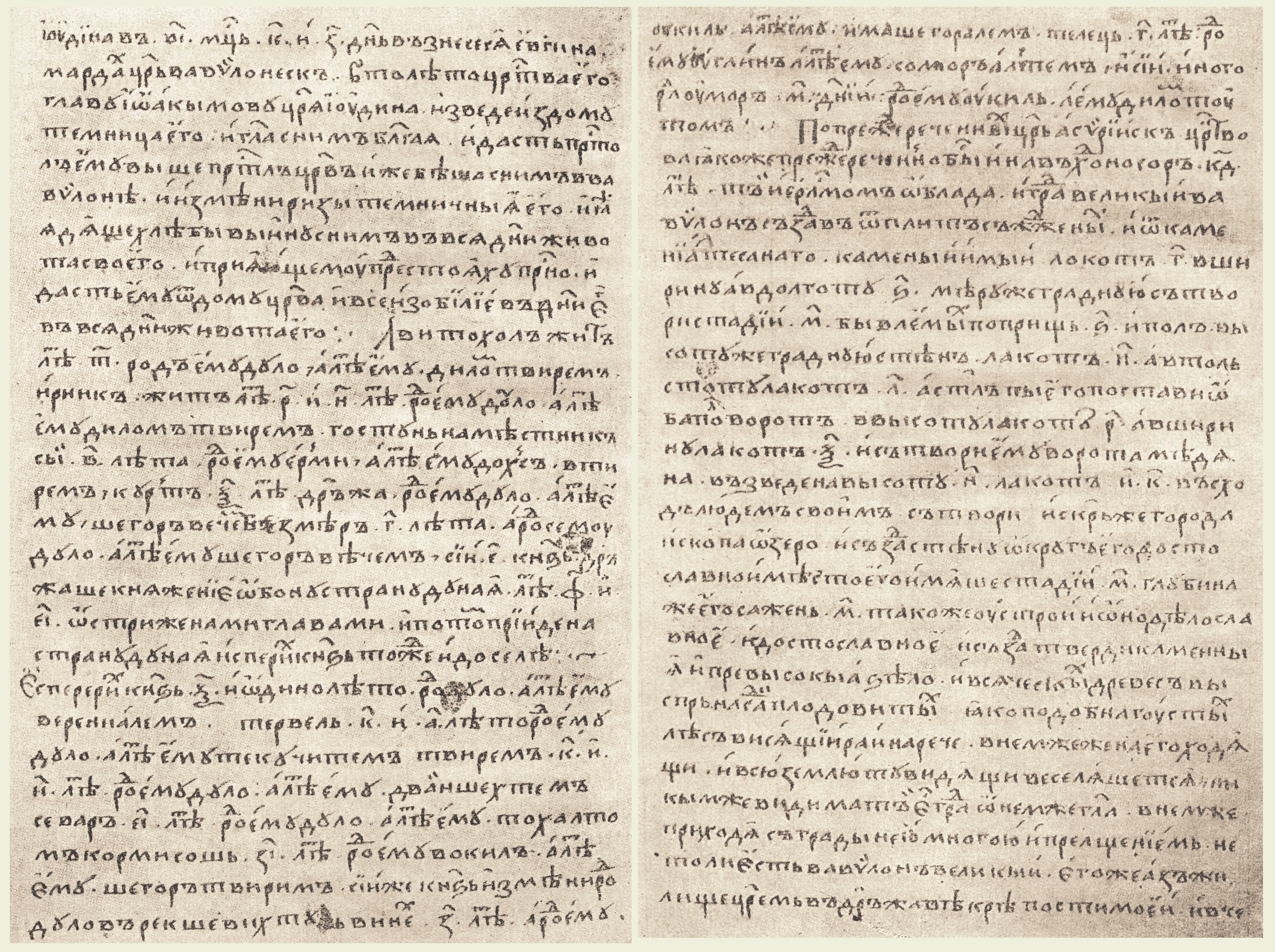
"Petrograd Manuscript" of the Nominalia.

The Nominalia of the Bulgarian Khans is a short text which in Church Slavonic is presumed to contain the names of some early Bulgar rulers, their clans, the year of their ascending to the throne according to the cyclic Bulgar calendar and the length of their rule, including the times of joint rule and civil war. It is written in Church Slavonic, but contains a large number of Bulgar names and date terms. The manuscript also does not contain any reference that this is a list of rulers of Bulgaria.

The Nominalia was found by the Russian scholar Andrey Popov in 1861, during his research on Russian chronographers. So far, three Russian copies of the document have been found. The earliest of them, the "Uvarov transcript", dates from the 15th century and the other two, the Pogodin and Moscow transcripts, from the 16th century. There are certain differences in the names' spellings in the manuscripts. Despite the commonly accepted name of the nominalia, the preserved Slavic transcripts from the 15th and 16th centuries do not mention the Central Asian title of khan. Only Asparuh (the founder of Danube Bulgaria) and his five predecessors are assigned the Slavonic title knyaz. It is believed that the preserved texts in Russian Church Slavonic are transcripts of a lost original, written in Old Bulgarian during the 9th and 10th centuries. However, some researchers believe that the Old Bulgarian original from the 10th century is a translation from two stone inscriptions, which were composed in Greek and Bulgar languages, during the 7th–8th centuries.

== The "Uvarov transcript" text ==
Авитохолъ житъ лет. ~т. род ему Дуло. а лет ему диломъ твирем. Ирникъ. житъ лет. ~(ри). род ему Дуло. а лет ему дилом твeримь. Гостунъ наместникь сьï два лета. род ему. Ерми. а лет ему дохсъ. втиремь. Куртъ: 60 лет дръжа. род ему Дуло. а лет ему шегоръ вечемь. Безмеръ ~г. лет. а род ему Дуло. а лет ему шегоръ вемь. сii ~е князь. дръжаше княженїе обону страну Дуная. летъ. ~ф. ~(еi). остриженами главами. И потом прiиде на страну Дунаа. Исперих княз тожде и доселе. Есперих княз. 61 лет. род Дуло. а лет ему верени алем. Тервель. -к~а. лето. род ему Дуло. а лет ему текучитем. твирем. ~(ки). лет. род ему Дуло. а род ему дваншехтем. Севаръ. ~(еl). лет. род ему Дуло. а лет ему тохалтом. Кормисошь. ~(зi). лет. род ему Вокиль. а лет ему шегоръ твиремь. Сiи же княз измени род Дулов. рекше Вихтунь. Винех. ~з. лет. а род ему Оукиль. а летъ ему имаше Горалемь. Телець. ~г. лета. род Оугаинь. а лет ему соморъ. алтемь. И сïй иного рад. Оуморъ. ~м. днïи. род ему Оукиль а ему дилом тоутомъ.

=== Translation ===
- Avitohol lived 300 years. His clan was Dulo and his year (of ascending to the throne) dilom tvirem.
- Ernak lived 150 years. His clan Dulo and his year dilom tverim.
- Gostun, the regent, 2 years. His clan Ermi and his year dokhs tvirem.
- Kubrat ruled 60 years. His clan Dulo and his year shegor vechem.
- Bezmer 3 years and his clan Dulo and his year shegor vem (vechem).

These five knyazes ruled the kingdom over the other side of the Danube for 515 years with shaven heads and after that came to this side of the Danube Asparuh knyaz and until now (rules).

- Asparuh knyaz 61 years (ruled). His clan Dulo and his year vereni alem.
- Tervel 21 years. His clan Dulo and his year tekuchitem tvirem.

(An additional ruler is sometimes inserted here, depending on the reading.)

- Sevar 15 years. His clan Dulo and his year toh altom.
- Kormisosh 17 years. His clan Vokil and his year shegor tvirem.
- Vinekh 7 years. His clan Ukil [Vokil]. And his year (imen)shegor alem.
- Telets 3 years. His clan Ugain and his year somor altem.
- Umor (ruled) 40 days. His clan Ukil [Vokil] and his year dilom tutom.

The italicized words are in the Bulgar language as given in the original manuscript and represent the year and month of ascending to the throne of each ruler according to the Bulgar calendar. Their translation is uncertain, but there appears to be a consensus that they are based on a system similar to the Chinese calendar (which was also adopted by many Turkic peoples and by the Mongols), with a cycle of 12 years, each bearing the name of an animal. The first word in each date is the name of the year, the second is an ordinal number designating the month.

There are widely diverging translations of the nominalia and especially of the Bulgar dates. This is partly due to the difficulty in identifying word boundaries, but the greatest differences today are due to the contrast between the traditional analysis of Bulgar as a Turkic language and historian Petar Dobrev's recently advanced proposal that it was an Iranian, more specifically Pamiri language. The "Turkic" reading, along with the "cyclic calendar" interpretation itself, was originally proposed by Finnish Slavist Jooseppi Julius Mikkola in 1913. Later, there have been various modifications and elaborations during the 20th century by scholars such as Géza Fehér, Omeljan Pritsak, and Mosko Moskov. Dobrev's "Iranian" reading actually preserves all but one of the previous translations of the year names, arguing that the Turkic names of the animals, far from proving that the Bulgars were Turkic, show that the Turkic peoples had borrowed these words from the Bulgars. He does change the numbers of the months. Dobrev backs his linguistic analysis with a thorough mathematical analysis to find no errors in dates and time spans, contrary to Moskov's claim of erroneously rounded time spans like the strange-looking some years and 15 months rounded down to some years.

The following table shows three interpretations - one of the earliest versions of the "classical" Turkic one by Zlatarski (1918, adhering closely to Mikkola), one of the most recent "Turkic" versions by Moskov (1988), and the "Iranian" one by Dobrev (1994).

Bulgar date	Turkic theory (Vasil Zlatarski)	Turkic theory (Mosko Moskov)	Iranian theory (Petar Dobrev)
dilom tvirem	Serpent, the 9th	Serpent, the 9th	Serpent, the 4th
dokhs tvirem	Boar, the 9th	Boar, the 9th	Boar, the 4th
shegor vechem	Ox, the 3rd	Ox, the 3rd	Ox, the 5th
vereni alem	Wolf, the 1st	Dragon, additional	Dragon, the 1st
tekuchitem tvirem	Dog, the 9th	Ram, the 9th	Horse, the 4th
toh altom	Hen, the 6th	Hen, the 6th	Hen, the 12th
shegor tvirem	Ox, the 9th	Ox, the 9th	Ox, the 4th
(imen)shegor alem	Horse, the 1st	Horse, additional	Ox, the 1st
somor altem	Rodent, the 6th	Rodent, the 6th	Rodent, the 12th
dilom tutom	Serpent, the 4th	Serpent, the 4th	Serpent, the 2nd
