= Pagan of Bulgaria =

Khan of Bulgaria from 767 to 768

Pagan Паган
- Khan of Bulgaria
- Reign: 767–768
- Predecessor: Toktu
- Successor: Telerig
- Died: 768; Near Varna, Bulgaria
- Father: Vineh of Bulgaria
- Mother: Wife of Vineh

Pagan (Bulgarian: Паган) was ruler of Bulgaria in 767–768.

== Biography ==
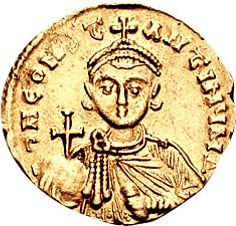
Emperor Constantine V

Pagan has been identified as a member of that faction of the Bulgarian aristocracy which sought to establish peaceful relations with the Eastern Roman Empire. After ascending the throne following the murder of his predecessor Toktu, Pagan set out together with his court to attend negotiations with Emperor Constantine V Kopronymos somewhere in Thrace. In the heated talks the emperor represented himself as intent on keeping the peace in Bulgaria and upbraided the Bulgarians for their anarchy, and for deposing their former ruler Sabin, who lived as a refugee at the imperial court. The emperor nevertheless agreed to make peace, and Pagan returned home.

At this point Constantine V suddenly invaded Bulgaria and managed to penetrate across the mountains into the core area of the Bulgarian state, setting afire some settlements around the Bulgarian capital Pliska. Although Constantine V did not follow up his relatively successful invasion and returned home, Pagan faced the wrath of his subjects who accused him of credulity and inability to oppose the enemy. The monarch fled in the direction of Varna, but was murdered by his servants, and succeeded by Telerig.

The 17th century Volga Bulgar compilation Cäğfär Taríxı (a work of disputed authenticity) represents Boyan (i.e., Pagan) as the son of the former ruler Bunek (i.e., Vinekh), and credits him with the expulsion of Sain (i.e., Sabin).

== See also ==
- History of Bulgaria
- Bulgars

== Sources ==
- Mosko Moskov (1988). Imennik na bălgarskite hanove (novo tălkuvane). Sofia.
- Jordan Andreev, Ivan Lazarov, Plamen Pavlov, Koj koj e v srednovekovna Bălgarija, Sofia 1999.

Preceded by Toktu	Khan of Bulgaria; 767–768	Succeeded by Telerig
