= Battle of the Rishki Pass =

759 CE battle between the Bulgarians and Byzantines

Coordinates: 42°56′14″N 26°56′22″E

- Part of the Byzantine–Bulgarian wars
Date	759
Location	Stara Planina
Result	Bulgarian victory

Belligerents
Bulgarian Empire	Byzantine Empire

Commanders and leaders
Vinekh	Constantine V

The Battle of the Rishki Pass (Bulgarian: Битката при Ришкия проход) or Battle of Veregava took place in the pass of the same name, in Stara Planina, Bulgaria in 759. It was fought between the Bulgarian Empire and the Byzantine Empire. The result was a Bulgarian victory.

== Origins of the conflict ==
Between 756 and 775, the Byzantine emperor Constantine V organised nine campaigns to eliminate Bulgaria and although he managed to defeat the Bulgarians several times, he never achieved his goal.

== Battle ==
In 759, the emperor led an army towards Bulgaria, but Khan Vinekh had enough time to bar several mountain passes. When the Byzantines reached the Rishki Pass (identification tentative, originally εἰς Βερεγάβαν, εἰς τήν κλεισȣ́ραν ‘to the klisura of Veregava’) they were ambushed and completely defeated. The Byzantine historian Theophanes the Confessor wrote that the Bulgarians killed the strategos of Thrace Leo, the commander of Drama, and many soldiers.

== Aftermath ==
Khan Vinekh did not take the favourable opportunity to advance on enemy territory and sued for peace. This act was very unpopular among the nobles and the Khan was murdered in 761.
