= Vineh of Bulgaria =

Khan of Bulgaria from 756 to 762

Vineh Винех
- Khan of Bulgaria
- Reign: 756–762
- Predecessor: Kormisosh
- Successor: Telets
- Issue: Pagan of Bulgaria

Vineh (also spelled Vinekh; Bulgarian: Винех) was ruler of Bulgaria in the mid-8th century. According to the Nominalia of the Bulgarian khans, Vineh reigned for seven years and was a member of the Vokil clan.

Vineh ascended the throne after the defeat of his predecessor Kormisosh by the Eastern Roman Emperor Constantine V. In c. 756 Constantine campaigned against Bulgaria by land and sea and defeated the Bulgarian army led by Vineh at Marcellae (Karnobat). The defeated monarch sued for peace and undertook to send his own children as hostages. In 759 Constantine invaded Bulgaria again, but this time his army was ambushed in the mountain passes of the Stara Planina (battle of the Rishki Pass). Vineh did not follow up his victory and sought to re-establish the peace. This won Vineh the opposition of the Bulgarian nobility, which had Vineh massacred together with his family, except Pagan of Bulgaria.

Vineh Peak on Rugged Island in the South Shetland Islands, Antarctica is named after Vineh of Bulgaria.

Preceded by Kormisosh	Khan of Bulgaria; 754–762	Succeeded by Telets
