= Cäğfär Taríxı =

Fabricated Russian-language translation of Volga Tatar historical material

The Cäğfär Taríxı (Tatar Cyrillic: Җәгъфәр тарихы, pronounced [ʑæɣˈfær tʌrɯɪˈxɯ]; Russian: Джагфар Тарихы, in English generally Djagfar Tarikhy, via the Russian transliteration of the Volga Tatar name; Tatar language for History of Cäğfär) is a Russian language partial translation of a supposed 17th-century Volga Tatar compilation of early historical material on the Bulgars, Khazars, Magyars and other Eurasian nomads. Most scholars view the work as a fabrication, while others view the work as authentic — a unique ancient source containing a lot of completely unknown information about the history of the peoples of Eastern Europe from the I millennium AD to the XVI century.

== History ==
According to its publisher, Fargat Nurutdinov, the Cäğfär Taríxı was written in its present form in Bashkortostan, by Baxşi İman, secretary of Cäğfär, the leader of a Tatar liberation movement that supposedly flourished there at the time. Nurutdinov states that the original, written in "Bulgar Turkic" (here equated with the language of the Volga Tatars), in the Arabic script, was translated into Russian in the late 1930s by his uncle I.M.-K.-Nigmatullin, who did this in order to save it from an NKVD campaign of confiscation and destruction of old Bulgar documents written in the Arabic script. The manuscript containing the Bulgar text was destroyed by NKVD agents. Nigmatullin himself was killed in World War II, and the translation was preserved by his mother, who eventually passed it over to her grandson, Nurutdinov, in 1976. He managed to copy parts of the translation, but the original translation and some of the copies were stolen from his father's country house in the 1980s by unknown perpetrators. Finally, Nurutdinov published the remaining text.

== Contents ==
The text refers to numerous persons and historical events unattested in other sources; for example, it makes references to mid 7th century Khazar rulers named Khalga and Kaban, who do not appear in the account of al-Tabari, in the Schechter Letter, in the Khazar Correspondence, or any other extant document. It also associates the Bulgars with what Nurutdinov interprets as references to Troy, Sumer and America.
