= Sevar of Bulgaria =

Khan of Bulgaria from 738 to 753

Sevar Севар
- Khan of Bulgaria
- Reign: 738–753
- Predecessor: Kormesiy
- Successor: Kormisosh
- House: Dulo

Sevar (Bulgarian: Севар) was a ruler of Bulgaria in the 8th century.

== Life ==
The Nominalia of the Bulgarian khans states that Sevar belonged to the Dulo clan and ruled for 15 years. According to the chronology developed by Moskov, Sevar would have reigned in 721–737. Other chronologies place his reign in 738–754. According to historians such as Steven Runciman and David Marshall Lang, Sevar was the last ruler of the Dulo dynasty and with Sevar died out the lineage of Attila the Hun.

It has been suggested that Sevar‘s name is derived from Persian Ziwar (adornment). Although initially a female name, it could also serve as a component of male names, as suggested by Chuvash pre-Christian name Aksĕver. Another etymology of Aksever would be from the Turkic word Ak (white), and Sever (to like) which has its roots in the Oghur Volga Bulgar word Sev or Sav in Chuvash, thereby the name Sevar could also be of Turkic etymology.

== Legacy ==
Sevar Point on Livingston Island is named after Sevar of Bulgaria.

== Literature ==
- Mosko Moskov, Imennik na bălgarskite hanove (novo tălkuvane), Sofia 1988.
- Jordan Andreev, Ivan Lazarov, Plamen Pavlov, Koj koj e v srednovekovna Bălgarija, Sofia 1999.
- (primary source), Bahši Iman, Džagfar Tarihy, vol. III, Orenburg 1997.

Preceded by Kormesij	Khan of Bulgaria; 721–737	Succeeded by Kormisosh
