= Kormisosh =

- Khan of Bulgaria
- Reign: 721-738
- Predecessor: Tervel or Sevar
- Successor: Sevar or Vineh
- House: Vokil clan

Kormisosh (Bulgarian: Кормисош), also known as Kormesiy, Kormesios, Krumesis, Kormisoš, or Cormesius, was a ruler of Bulgaria during the 8th century, recorded in a handful of documents. Modern chronologies of Bulgarian rulers place him either as the successor of Tervel and predecessor of Sevar, or the successor of Sevar and predecessor of Vineh.

== Sources ==
Kormisosh is mentioned in the Nominalia of the Bulgarian Khans, a 9th–11th century document recording early Bulgarian rulers, wherein he is placed between the rulers Sevar and Vineh, is said to have ruled for 17 years, and is assigned to the Vokil clan. The assignment to the Vokil clan is notable given that all of the previous rulers were assigned to the Dulo clan.

Kormisosh is also recorded in the Chronicle of the Byzantine chronicler Theophanes the Confessor, recorded to have variously fought against and allied with the Byzantine Empire. Most notably, he is said to have allied with the emperors Theodosius III (715–717) and Leo III (717–741) against the Umayyad Caliphate. He is also said to have signed a trade agreement with Theodosius III. Contradictingly, other documents indicate that Kormisosh was a contemporary of Emperor Constantine V (741–775), whom he warred against (at one point Kormisosh's forces are said to have reached Constantinople itself).

== Chronology ==
Some Bulgarian scholars consider the contradictory dates of the two surviving references to Kormisosh to indicate that they refer to two different rulers, placing a "Kormesiy" as reigning between Tervel and Sevar, and a separate "Kormisosh" as reigning between Sevar and Vineh. Most researchers however believe there to have been only one such ruler, chronologically misplaced by one of the sources. It is for instance often considered likely that the early placement of Kormisosh in the works of Theophanes is an error and that the Bulgarian ruler actually meant is Tervel.

Fine (1991) and Detrez (2014) place Kormisosh between Sevar and Vineh, reigning 739–756. Treadgold (1997) likewise places him between Sevar and Vineh, though dates him to 750–762. Morby (2014) and Curta (2019) however place Kormisosh between Tervel and Sevar and dates his reign to 721–738.

== See also ==
- History of Bulgaria
- Bulgars

Preceded by Sevar	Khan of Bulgaria; 8th century	Succeeded by Vineh
