= Telets of Bulgaria =

Khan of Bulgaria from 762 to 765

Telets Телец
- Khan of Bulgaria
- Reign: 762–765
- Predecessor: Vinekh
- Successor: Sabin
- Born: c. 731
- Died: c. 764
- House: Ugain

Telets (Bulgarian: Телец), a member of the Ugain clan, was the ruler of Bulgaria from 762 to 765. Byzantine sources indicate that Telets replaced the legitimate rulers of Bulgaria. The same sources describe Telets as a brave and energetic man in his prime (about 30 years old). Scholars have conjectured that Telets may have belonged to an anti-Slavic faction of the Bulgarian nobility.

After his accession, Telets led a well-trained and well-armed army against the Byzantine Empire and devastated the Empire's frontier zone, inviting the emperor to a contest of strength. Emperor Constantine V Kopronymos marched north on June 16, 763, while another army was carried by a fleet of 800 ships (each carrying infantry and 12 horsemen) with the intent to create a pincer movement from the north.

Telets at first fortified the mountain passes with his troops and some twenty thousand Slavic auxiliaries. Later he changed his mind and led out his troops to the plain of Anchialos (Pomorie) on June 30. The bloody battle of Anchialus then began at mid-morning, and lasted until dusk. At the end, Telets' Slavic auxiliaries deserted him for the emperor, who won the field but chose to return home in triumph. According to the Byzantine sources, Constantine V brought home a throng of Bulgarian prisoners in wooden restraints, for the entertainment of Constantinople's populace.

The military defeat sealed the fate of Telets, who was lynched together with his supporters by his rebellious subjects.

== See also ==
- History of Bulgaria
- Bulgars

Preceded by Vinekh	Knyaz of Bulgaria; 762–765	Succeeded by Sabin
