= Church of Saint Paraskevi, Nesebar =

Church building in Nesebar, Bulgaria

Coordinates: 42°39′34.7″N 27°44′8.36″E

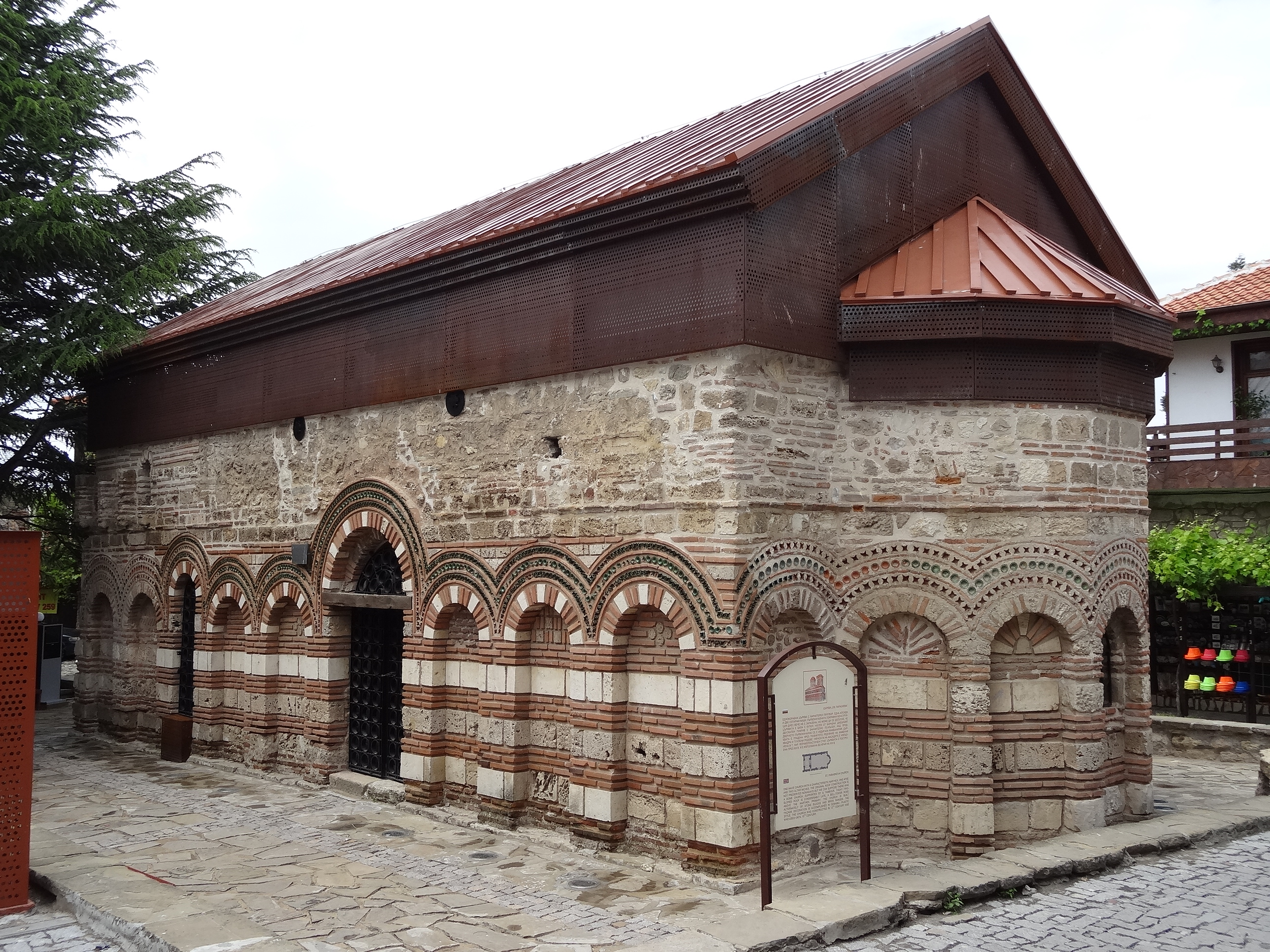
View of the south wall and the entrance of the Church of Saint Paraskevi in Nesebar

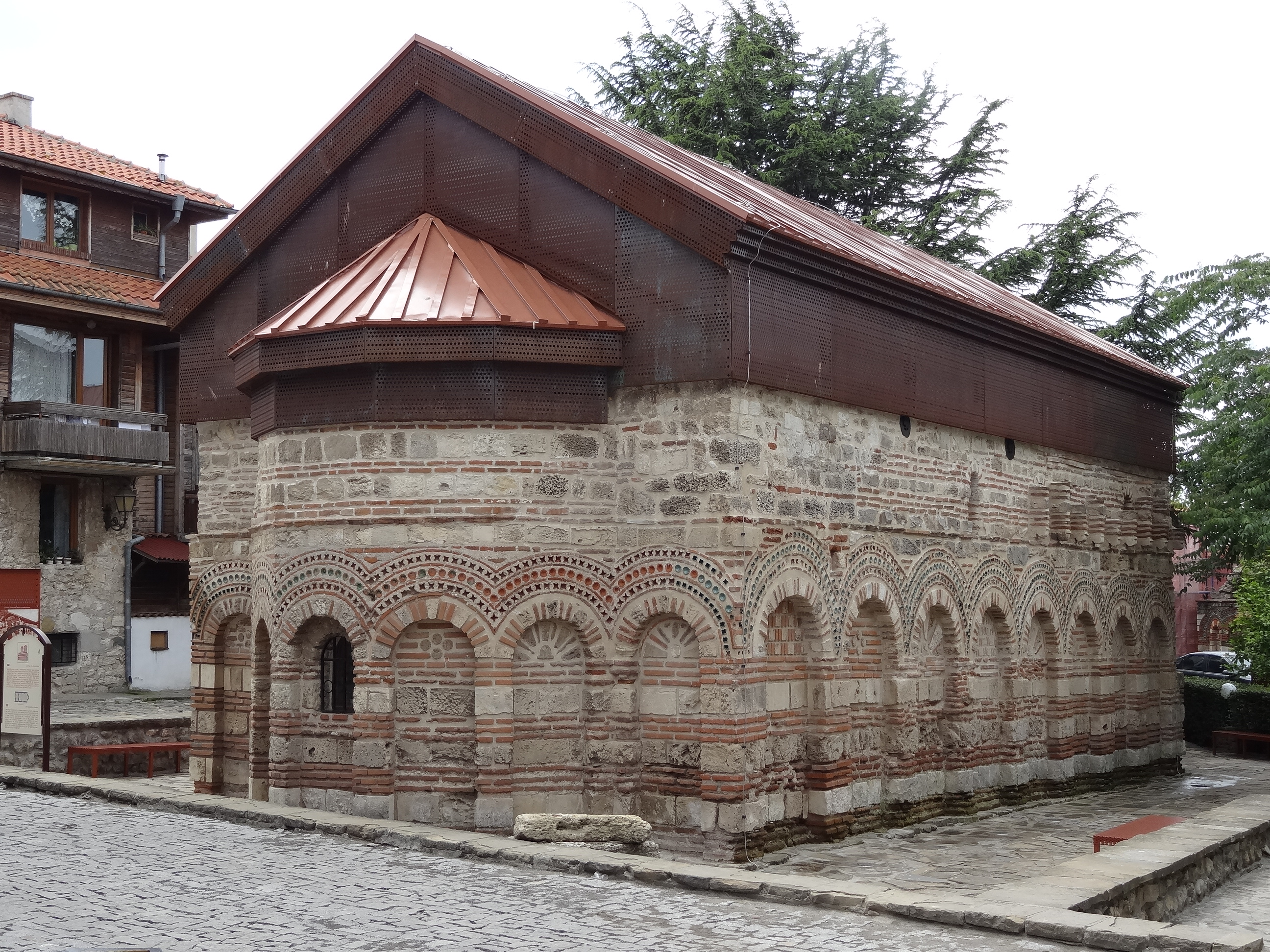
Apse view

The Church of Saint Paraskevi (Bulgarian: църква „Света Параскева“, tsarkva „Sveta Paraskeva“, Byzantine Greek: Ναός Αγίας Παρασκευής) is a partially preserved medieval Eastern Orthodox church in Nesebar (medieval Mesembria), a town on the Black Sea coast of Burgas Province in eastern Bulgaria. It was most likely built in the 13th or 14th century and forms part of the Ancient Nesebar UNESCO World Heritage Site. The Church of Saint Paraskevi features a single nave and a pentagonal apse as well as rich exterior decoration. Its dome and the belfry surmounting the narthex have not been preserved today, and it is unknown which of the three saints named Paraskevi it was dedicated to.

== History ==
The dating of the Church of Saint Paraskevi is disputed. While some researchers ascribe its original construction to the 10th century, it is generally held that it was built in the 13th–14th century. This estimate is based on its architectural similarities to churches of that period in the medieval Bulgarian capital Veliko Tarnovo. Rough Guides author Jonathan Bousfield attributes its construction to the reign of Tsar Ivan Alexander of Bulgaria (r. 1331–1371). However, during this period Nesebar changed hands multiple times between the Second Bulgarian Empire and Byzantium.

Along with other architectural sites in the old town of Nesebar, the church forms part of the Ancient City of Nesebar UNESCO World Heritage Site and the 100 Tourist Sites of Bulgaria. It was listed among Bulgaria's monuments of culture of national importance in 1964. It is not an active church today, though it remains in use and houses an art gallery.

It remains uncertain which of the saints known as Paraskevi the church was dedicated to. Early Christian martyrs Paraskevi of Rome and Paraskevi of Iconium were better known in the Byzantine Empire and particularly its capital Constantinople, though Paraskevi of Epibatos was more popular in Bulgaria and was recognised by Ivan Alexander as his personal patron. Scholar Bistra Nikolova believes the former two options to be more likely.

== Architecture and decoration ==
The Church of Saint Paraskevi is a single-nave church, measuring 8.45 by 4.85 metres (27.7 ft × 15.9 ft), 14.70 by 6.60 metres (48.2 ft × 21.7 ft) or 15 by 6 metres (49 ft × 20 ft) and built according to the Byzantine cross-in-square design. It features a narthex in its western part and a single wide pentagonal apse in its eastern section. The church was built out of bricks and smoothed stones and based on a pseudo-opus mixtum technique which also employed wooden beams. The nave was barrel-vaulted by two arches.

The church does not include a separate sanctuary in front of the altar, though semicircular niches to the sides of the apse serve as its prothesis and diaconicon. The plan of the church also includes several square niches which bear similarity to similar executions in churches in medieval Veliko Tarnovo. The entrance to the church is on the south wall. In the past, the church had a dome, and its present double-pitched roof was built in more recent times.

The narthex of the church was once topped by calotte and a bell tower, which has not been preserved today. The tower was accessible via a vaulted stone staircase on the west wall of the church. The belfry is a feature that the Church of Saint Paraskevi shares with other churches in Nesebar, such as the Church of the Holy Archangels Michael and Gabriel and the Church of Saint Theodore. Unlike the Church of the Holy Archangels, though, the staircase of the Church of Saint Paraskevi was on the outside, as in the Church of Christ Pantocrator.

Much like other churches in Nesebar dating to the same period, the Church of Saint Paraskevi was lavishly decorated on the outside. The design of the exterior walls includes two rows of richly ornamented blind arches. Two rows of eight narrow arches each decorate the north and south walls, with an additional three on the west wall and two on either side of the apse. The lower arcade was larger than the upper one, though both were decorated with archivolts composed of three rows of coloured ceramic rosettes. The lunettes were built out of stones and bricks in various shapes, including ornamental fish bones, suns, chequered and zigzag patterns.
