= Church of the Holy Archangels Michael and Gabriel, Nesebar =

Medieval church in Burgas, Bulgaria

Coordinates: 42°39′34″N 27°44′6″E

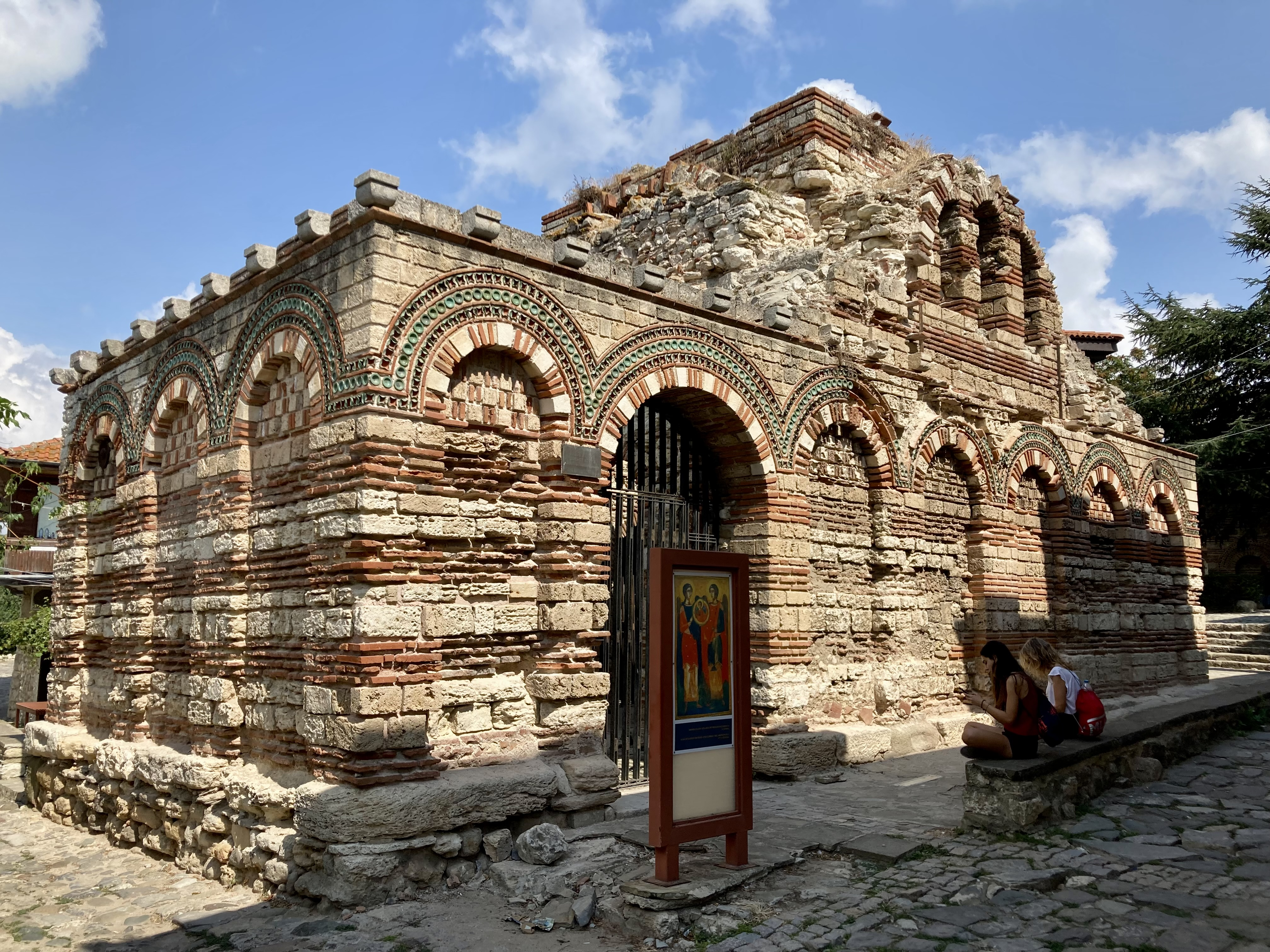
The Church of the Holy Archangels in Nesebar

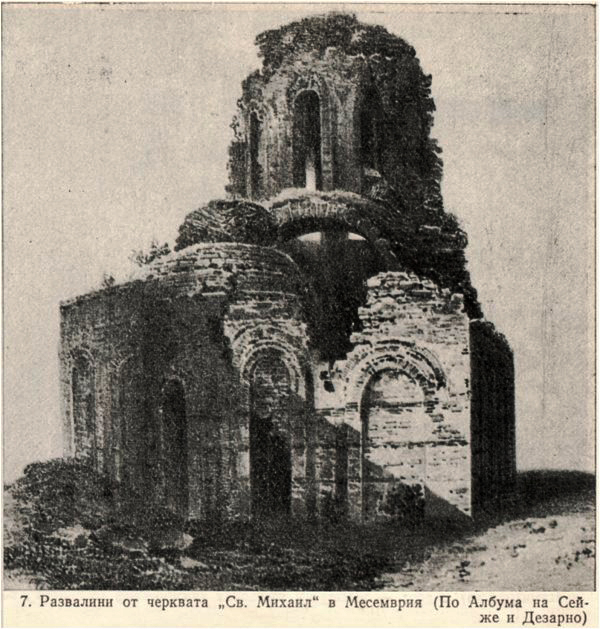
The church as it appeared in the 19th century

The Church of the Holy Archangels Michael and Gabriel (Bulgarian: църква „Свети архангели Михаил и Гавраил“, tsarkva „Sveti Arhangeli Mihail i Gavrail“) is a partially preserved medieval Eastern Orthodox church in the eastern Bulgarian town of Nesebar (medieval Mesembria), on the Black Sea coast of Burgas Province. It was built in the 13th or 14th century and forms part of the Ancient Nesebar UNESCO World Heritage Site. A single-nave church with three apses, in the past it was topped by a dome and a bell tower. Its rich external decoration was done in Nesebar's characteristic style.

== Location and history ==
The Church of the Holy Archangels lies in the northern part of Nesebar's old town, next to the coast of the peninsula on which the city is located. Based on its stylistic similarities to the Church of Christ Pantocrator, the building of the church is commonly assigned to the same period, namely between the early 13th and early 14th century. Rough Guides author Jonathan Bousfield attributes its construction to the reign of Tsar Ivan Alexander of Bulgaria (r. 1331–1371), though during this period Nesebar changed hands multiple times between the Second Bulgarian Empire and Byzantium.

As the church lies in the old town of Nesebar, it forms part of the Ancient City of Nesebar UNESCO World Heritage Site and the 100 Tourist Sites of Bulgaria. Since 1927, it has been under state protection as a "national antiquity", and it was listed among Bulgaria's monuments of culture of national importance in 1964. The church is partially preserved, as most of its roof is missing. The extant arches have been reinforced using steel stretchers.

== Architecture and decoration ==
In terms of architectural design, the Church of the Holy Archangels Michael and Gabriel follows the Byzantine cross-in-square plan. The church measures 15 by 7 metres (49 ft × 23 ft) or 13.90 by 5.30 metres (45.6 ft × 17.4 ft), and its walls are from 0.85 m (2.8 ft) to 1.30 m (4.3 ft) thick. It has a single nave topped by a dome and two arches along the length of the dome. The church has three apses, each with a window. The three-walled central apse is the largest and the two side apses merge into its sides. Two pillars aligned with the points where the side apses merges into the main apse divide the altar into a prothesis and a diaconicon.

The church features a large narthex which includes two vaults to the side of the wide entrance on its east wall. There are two other entrances, another wide entrance on the narthex and one accessing the nave from the north. In the past, the church featured a rectangular bell tower above the narthex, which was also part of the design of Nesebar's Church of St Paraskeva and Church of St Theodore. The entire plan of the Church of the Holy Archangels, including the position of the belfry, has much in common with the earlier Church of the Holy Mother of God at Asen's Fortress and the Chora Church in Constantinople. The bell tower was accessible via a stone stairway which stood in the western section of the nave.

As customary for Nesebar's medieval religious architecture, the Church of the Holy Archangels Michael and Gabriel boasts lavish external decoration in a style characteristic for the city. The church was built according to the opus mixtum technique using interchanging straight rows of brickwork and stones arranged in a chequered pattern. Three or four rows of bricks typically follow two rows of carved stones. The external walls feature elaborate connected blind arches, seven on the north and south walls and three on the west wall. The north and south walls also include semicircular pediments in the upper reaches. Each of these has three windows. Brick details and friezes of triple bands of coloured ceramic rosettes and circles inside the arches complete the exterior decoration of the church.
