= Basilica of the Holy Mother of God Eleusa, Nesebar =

Former monastery in Nesebar, Bulgaria

Coordinates: 42°39′40″N 27°44′17″E

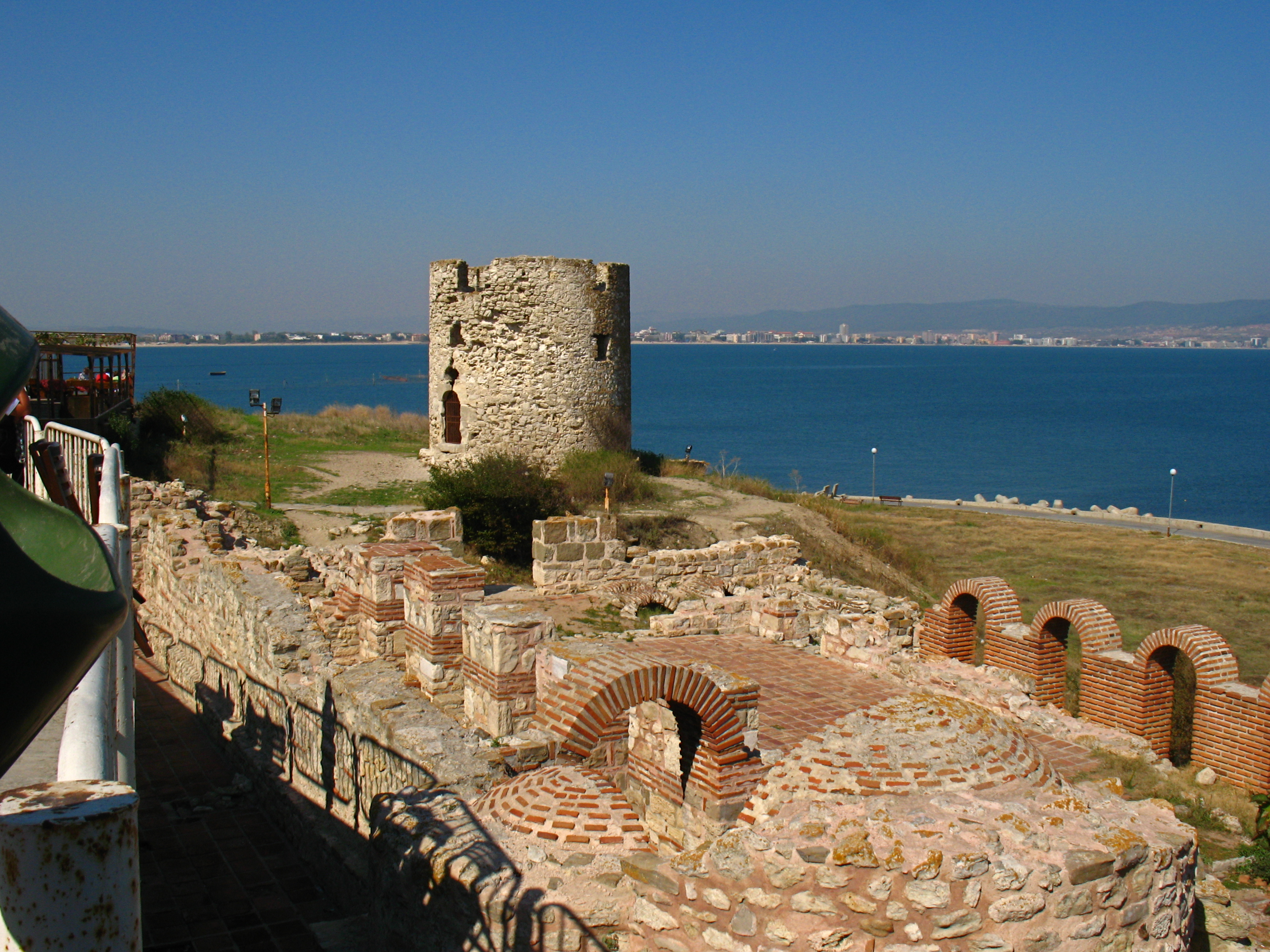
Restored basilica church of the Holy Mother of God Eleusa in Nesebar, Bulgaria, with windmill

The Basilica of the Holy Mother of God Eleusa, Nesebar, is a former monastery church situated in the UNESCO World Heritage town of Nesebar in Bulgaria and dedicated to the Blessed Virgin Mary under the title "Eleusa", Ελεούσσα in Byzantine Greek, or "the Tender".

The church, on the northern side of the peninsula, was built in the 6th century. It is recorded until the 14th century, and formed part of a monastery complex. It is presumed to have been destroyed by an earthquake.

The northern part and the central nave had sunk into the sea, but in 1920 excavations and research began here, and the church is now well-preserved and partly restored.

It has three naves, three apses and a narthex, with two smaller apses on the north and south sides. It is 28 m long and 18 m wide.
