= Church of St Stephen, Nesebar =

Building in Burgas, Bulgaria

Coordinates: 42°39′28″N 27°43′59″E

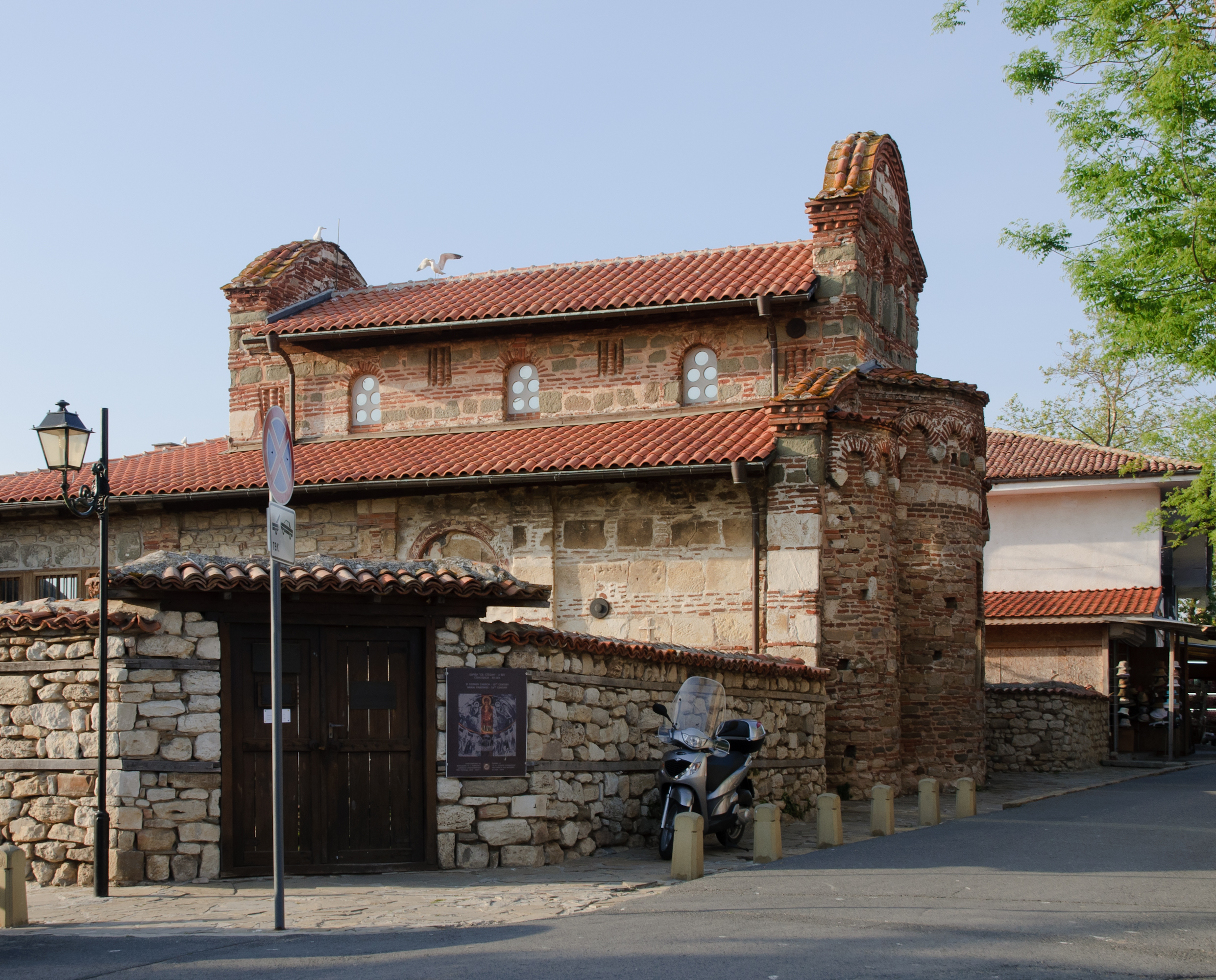
The Church of St Stephen

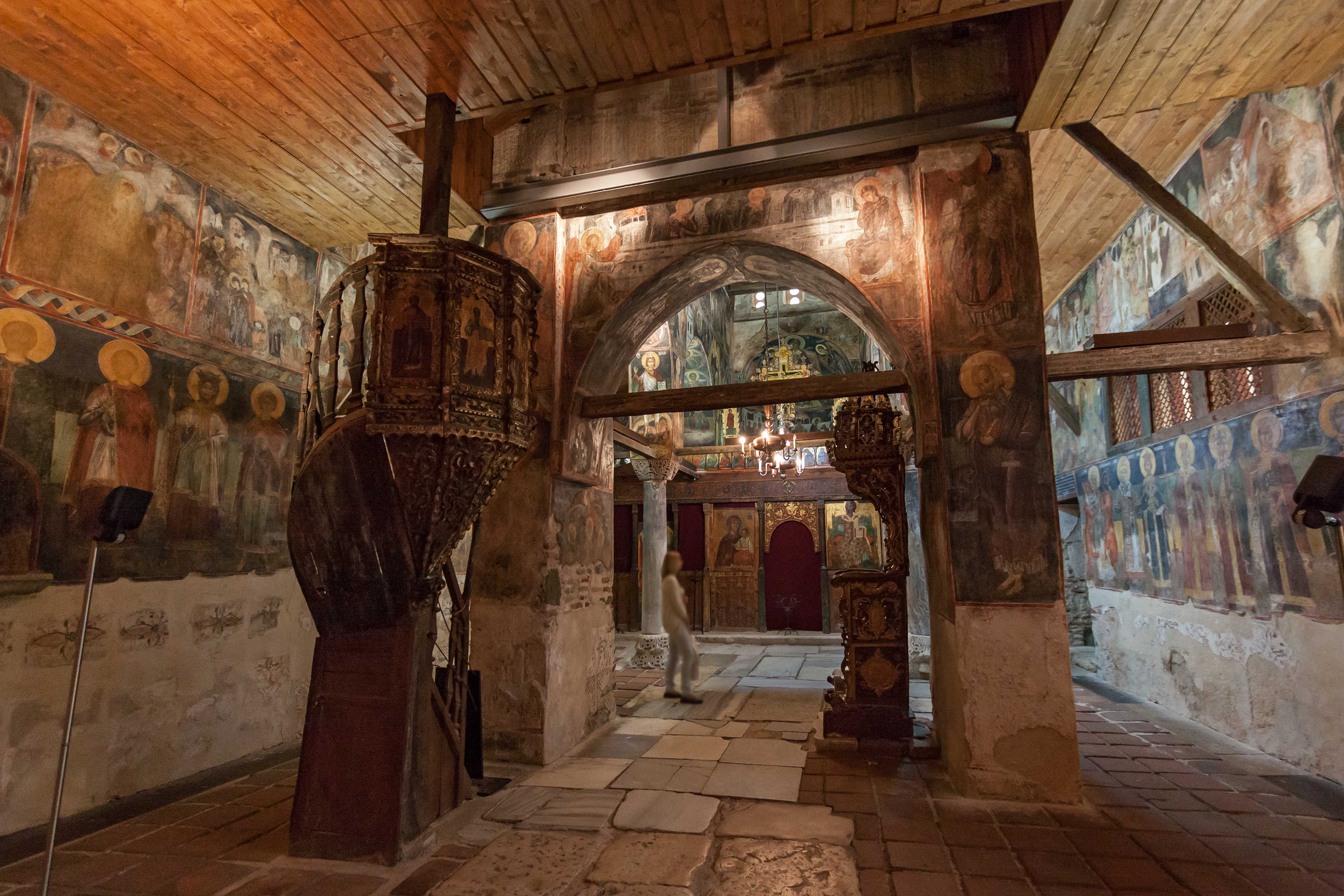
Nesebar. View from western gate towards the interior of the Church of St Stephen.

The Church of St. Stephen (Bulgarian: Свети Стефан, Sveti Stefan) is a former Eastern Orthodox Church in Nessebar, Eastern Bulgaria, which is now turned into a museum. It is part of architectural and historical reserve in the city, which is part of the UNESCO World Heritage Site and one of the 100 national tourist sites. The building consists of a three-nave basilica with dimensions 12.1 x 9.5 m, and served as the cathedral church of the metropolitan center in the province of Nessebar.

The church has been restored and enlarged several times and is difficult to be dated exactly. The eastern part is the oldest and probably dates from the 11th century. Some centuries later the church was enlarged by adding a new structure to the west. The western wall was demolished and the present narthex was built. The church was timber-roofed. The exterior is rich in design. The eastern and the western façades are crowned with pediments in the form of trefoil arches. The eastern façade is more elaborate. It comprises three high apses, the middle of which rises above the side ones. All three are decorated with ceramic plaques. A colourful effect is achieved by the mixed masonry of stone and bricks, without keeping to any fixed pattern. The decoration of the façade is the reason for defining this church as an example of the ornamental architectural style.

The interior of the church is richly adorned with hundreds of murals by three artists, depicting scenes from the life of the Virgin Mary, biblical miracles, and Judgement Day.

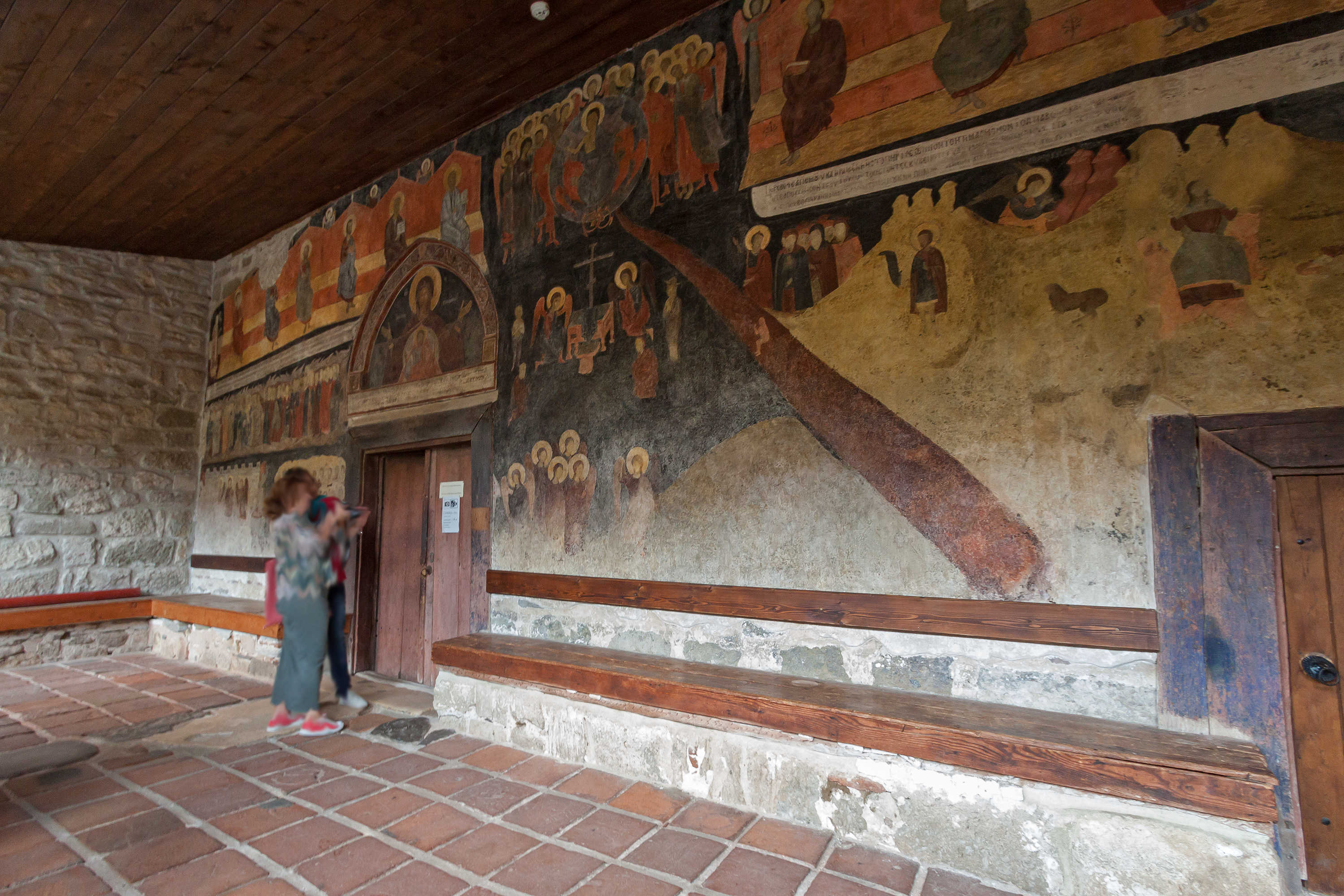

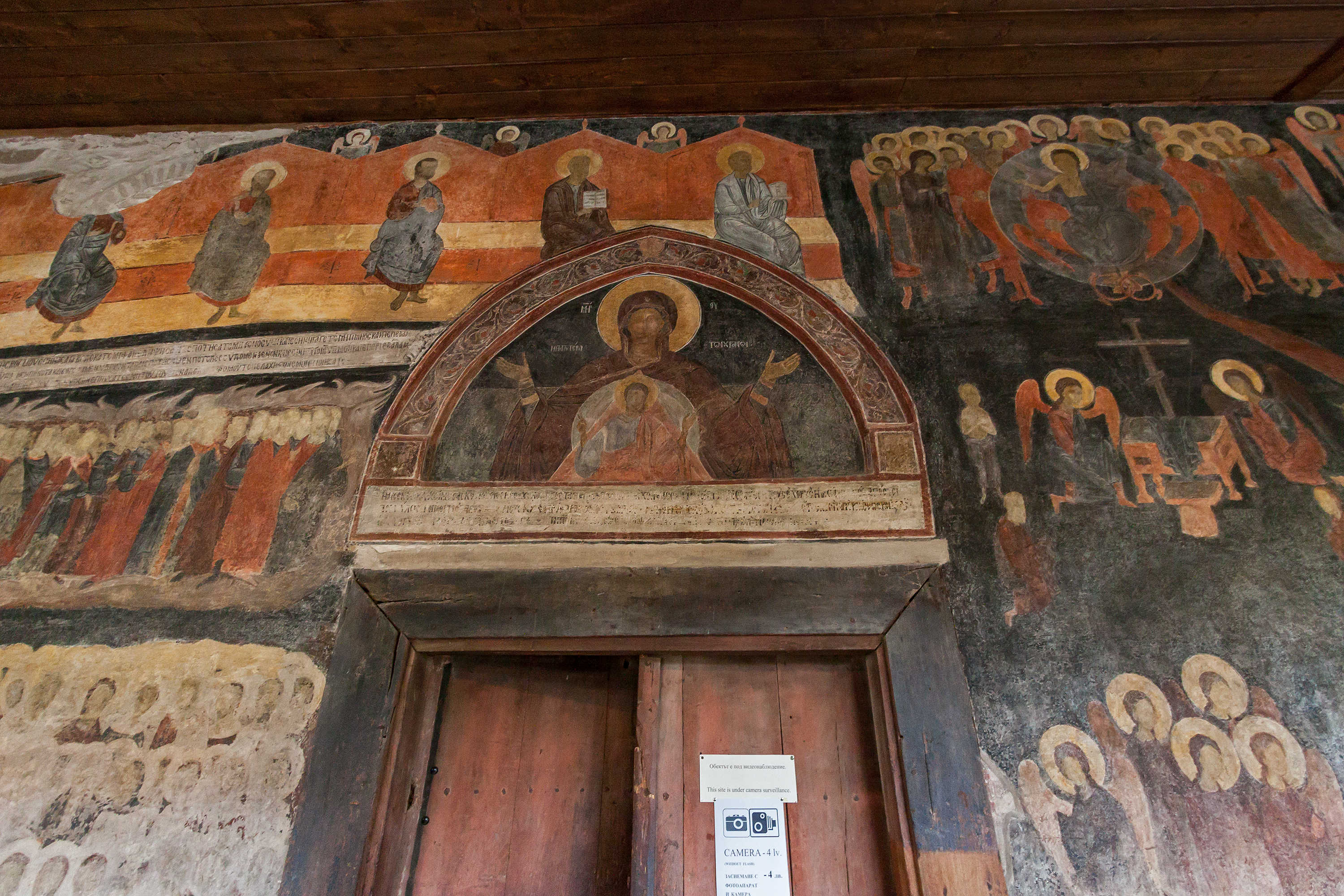

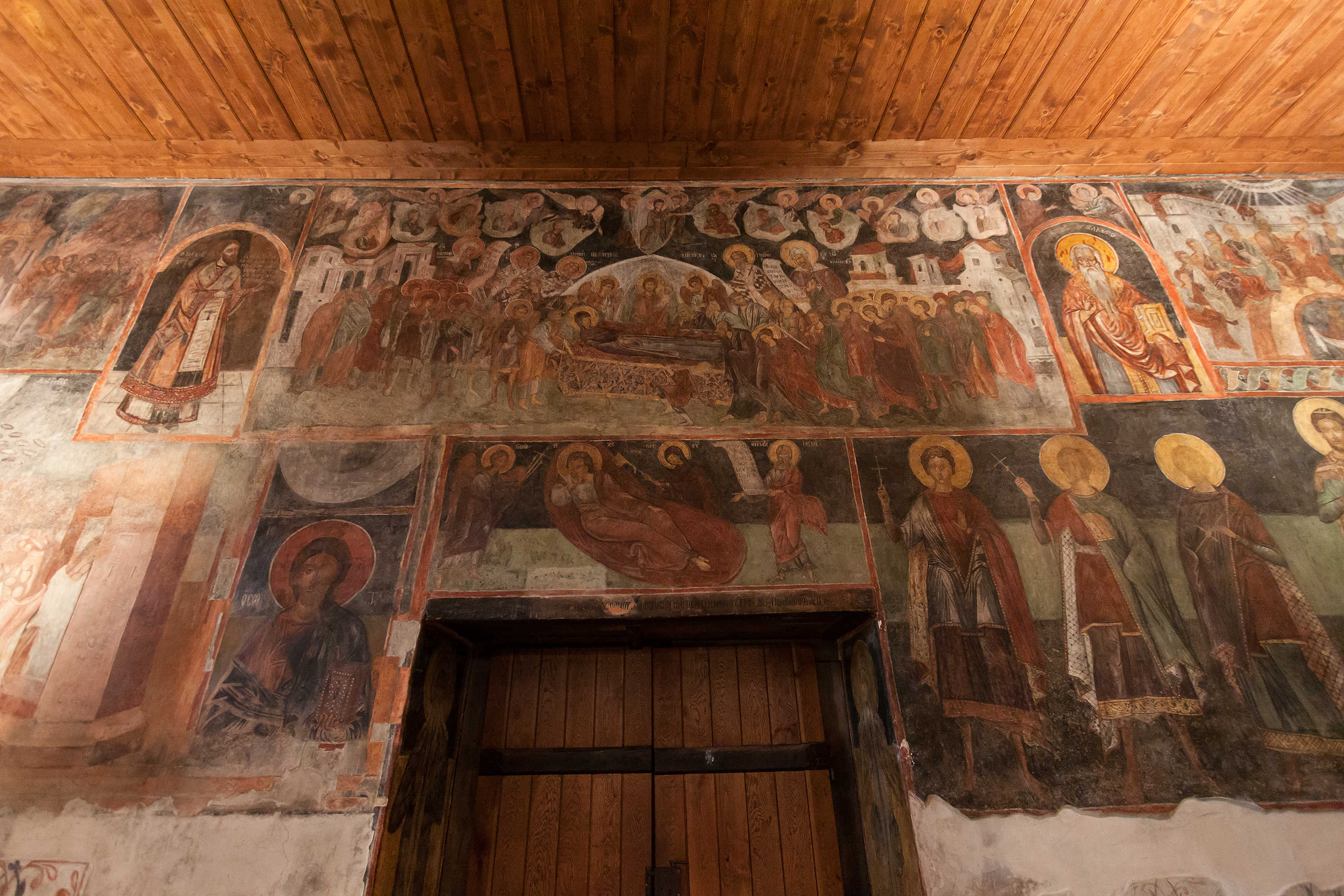

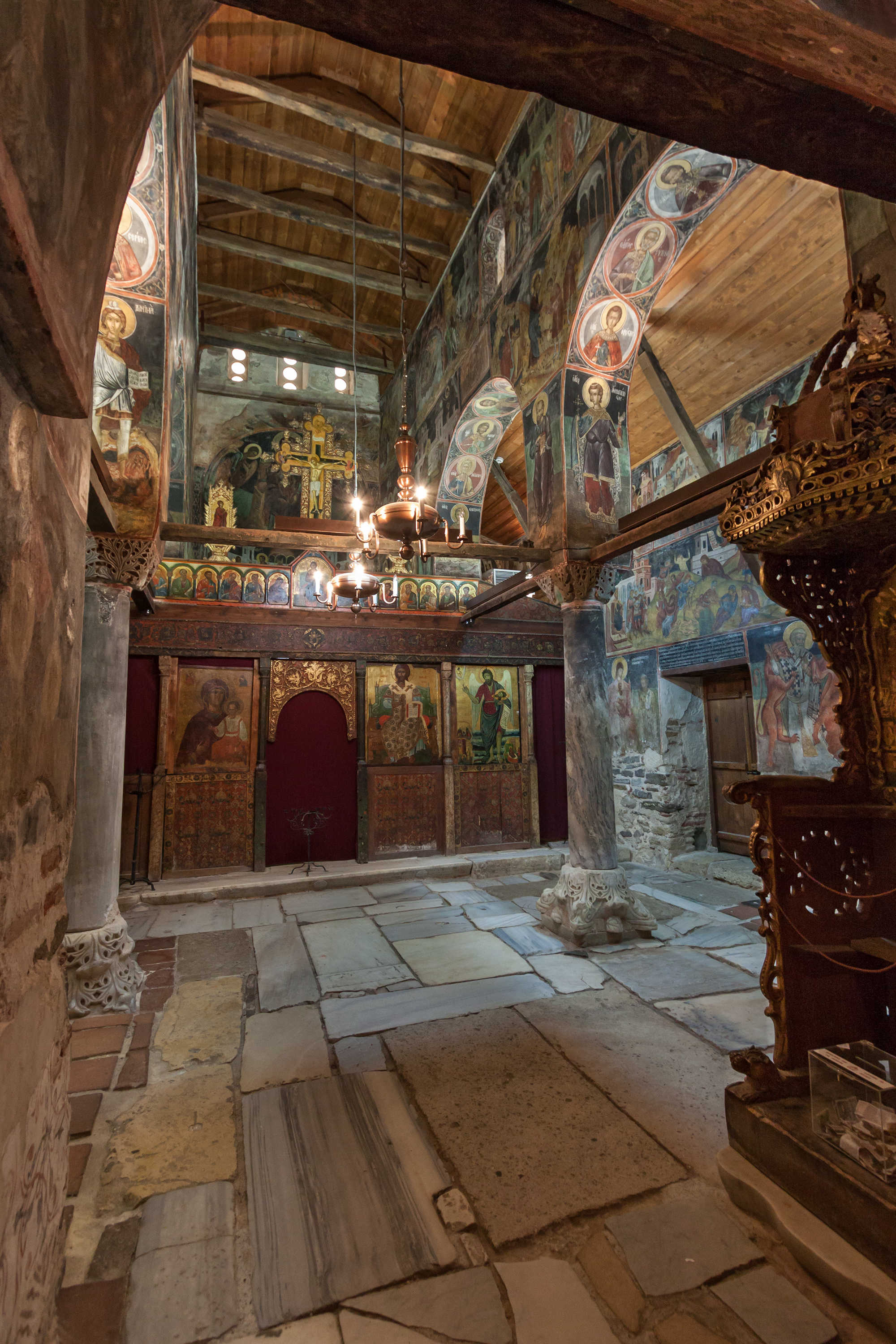

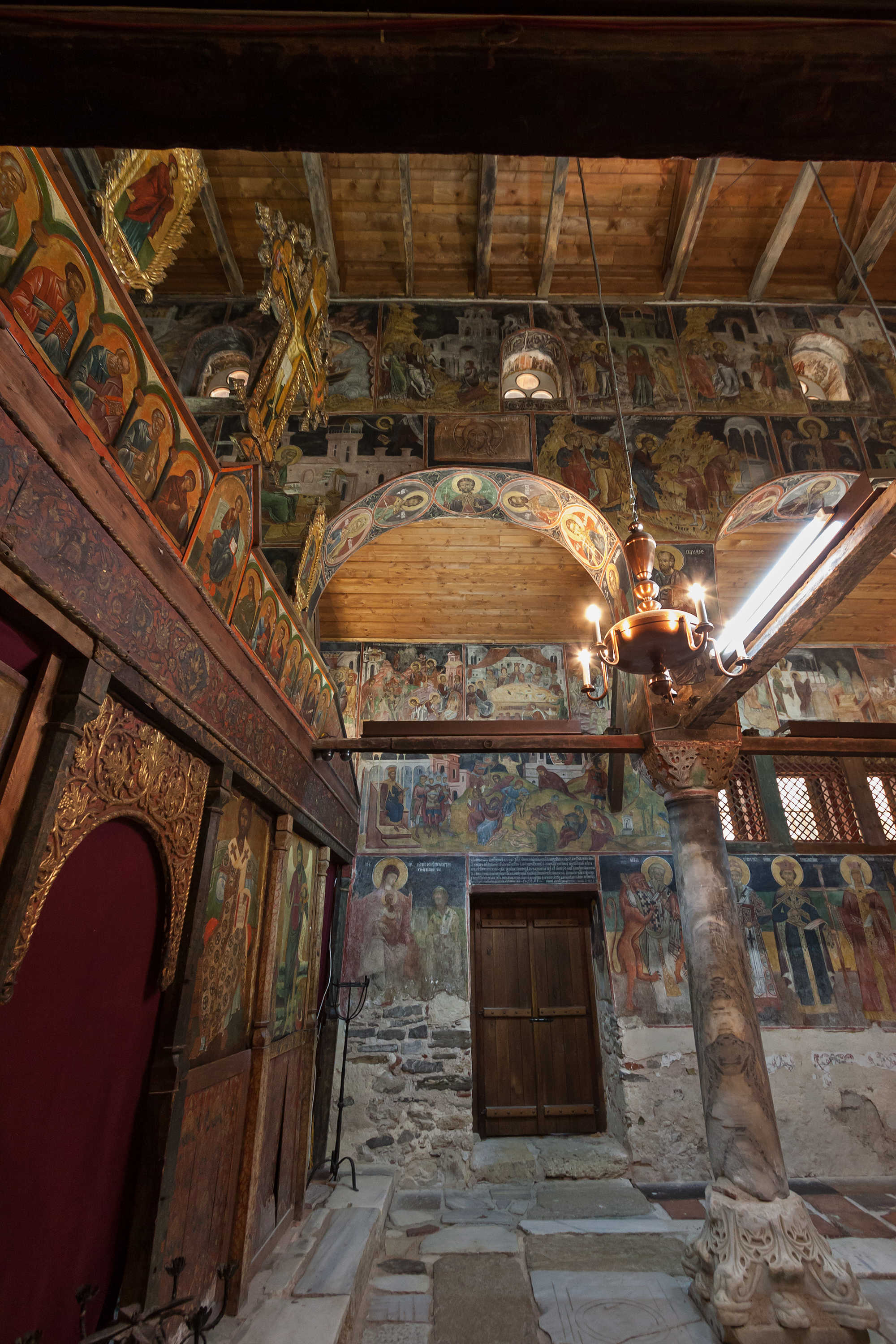

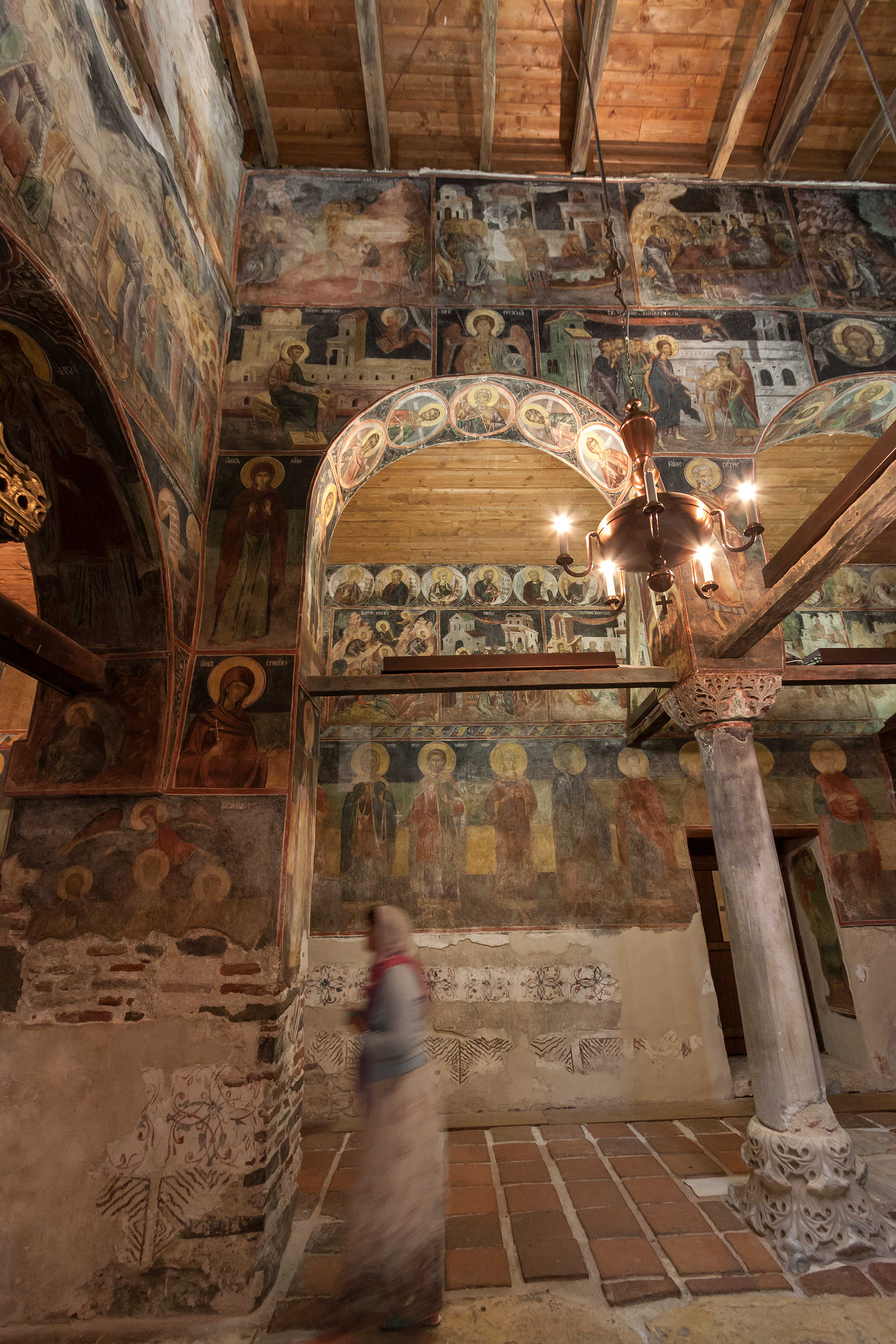

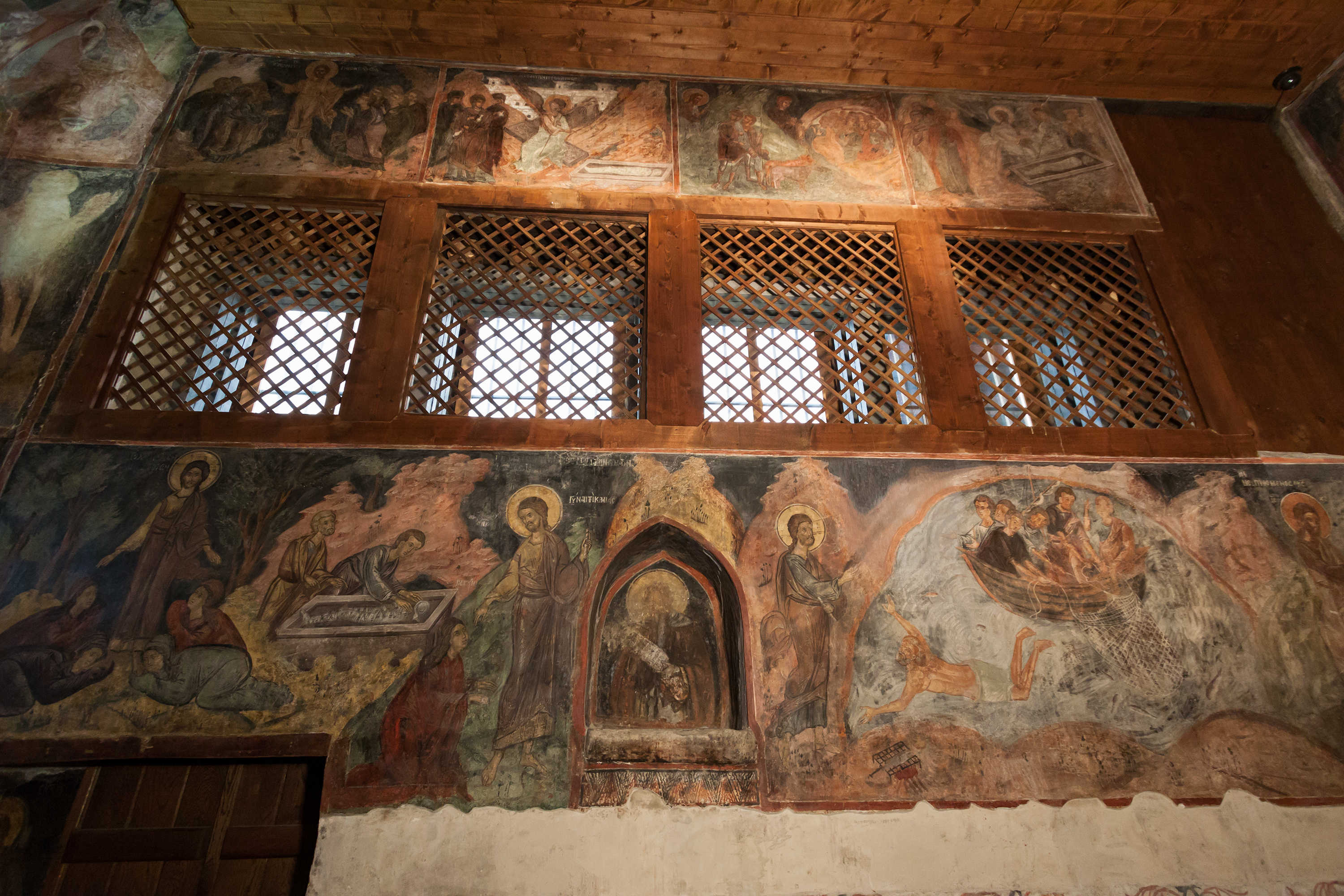

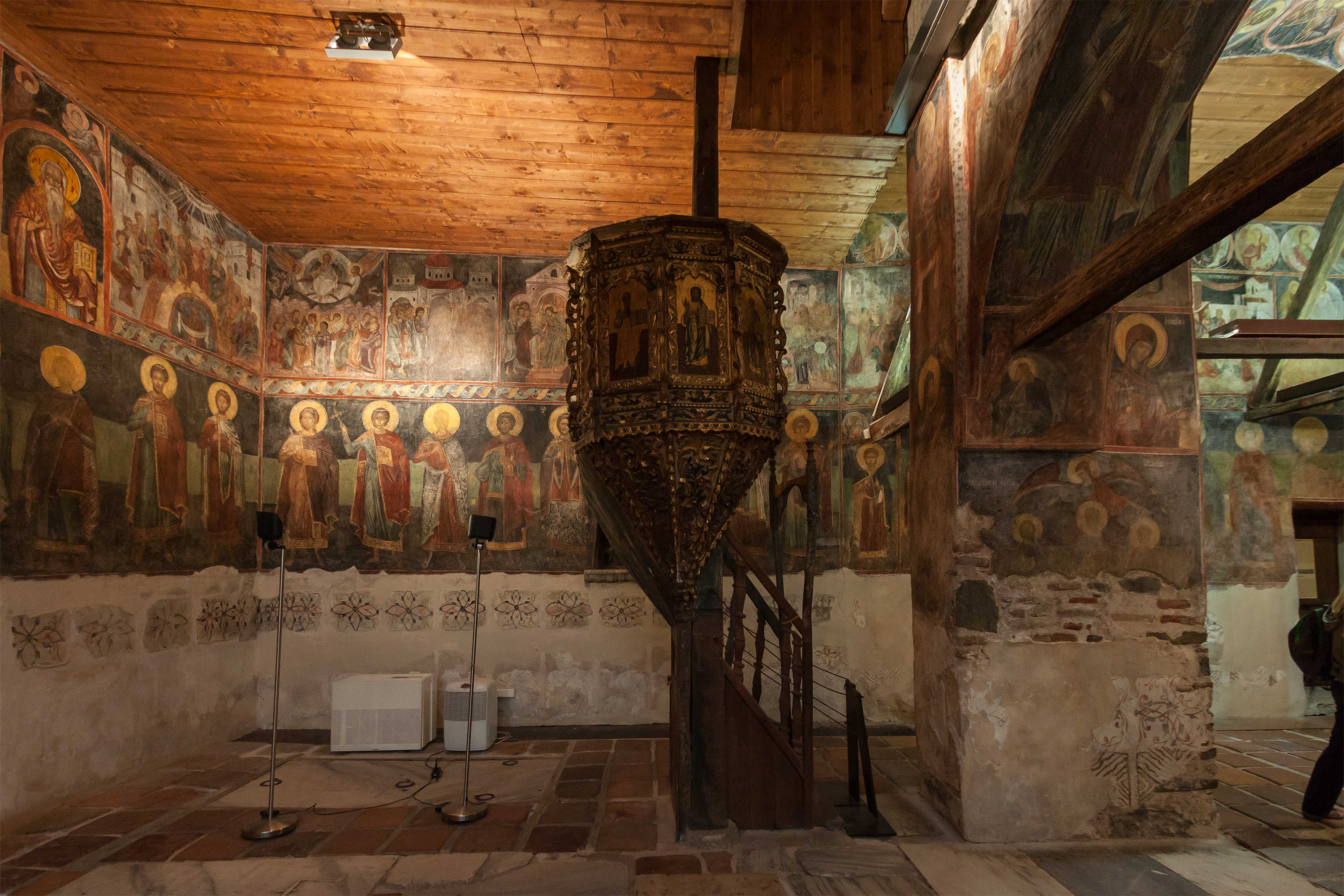

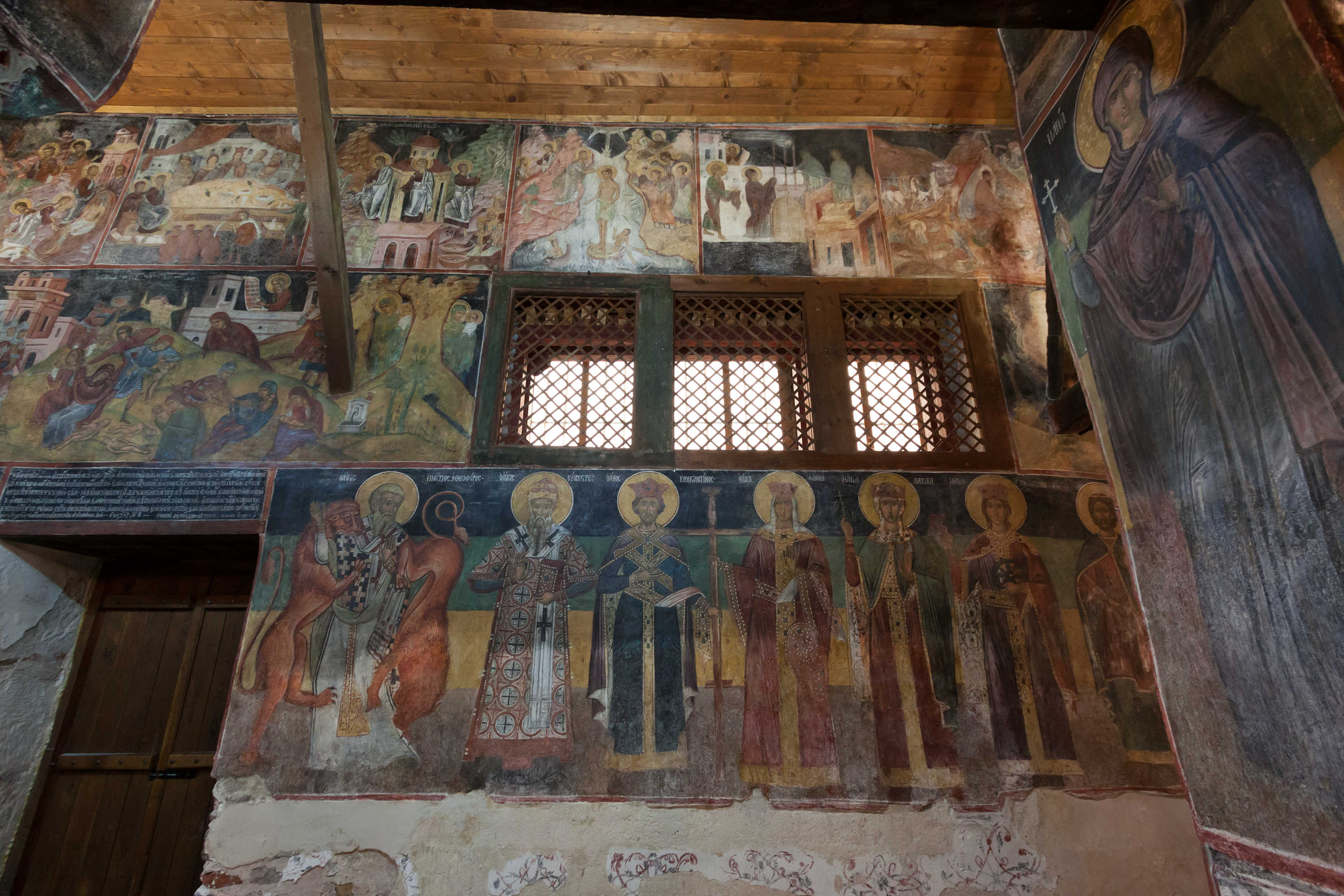
