= Nesebar =

Nesebar Несебър
- City
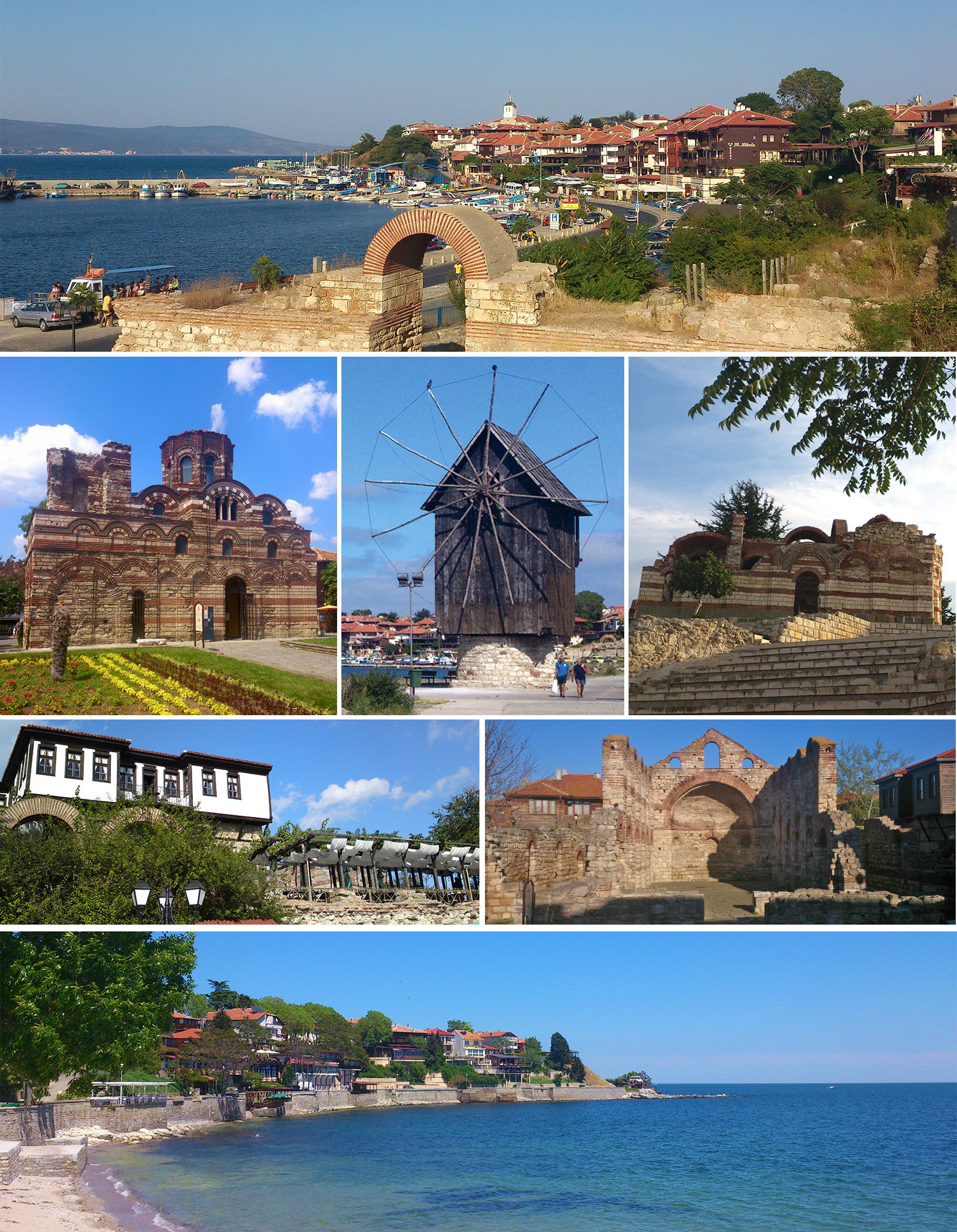
- From top left: Northern harbour, Church of Christ Pantokrator, The wooden windmill on the isthmus, Church of St John Aliturgetos, Old house and town walls, Church of St Sophia, Southern bay of the old town

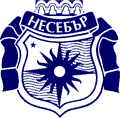
- Coat of arms

- Location within Bulgaria
- Coordinates: 42°39′N 27°44′E
- Country: Bulgaria
- Province: Burgas

Government
  - Mayor: Nikolay Dimitrov

Area
  - City: 31.852 km^{2} (12.298 sq mi)
- Elevation: 30 m (98 ft)

Population (15.12.2010)
  - City: 13,347
  - Metro: 28,957
- Demonym: Neseberian
- Time zone: UTC+2 (EET)
  - Summer (DST): UTC+3 (EEST)
- Postal code: 8230
- Area code: 0554

UNESCO World Heritage Site
- Official name: Ancient City of Nessebar
- Criteria: Cultural: iii, iv
- Reference: 217
- Inscription: 1983 (7th Session)
- Area: 27.1 ha (67 acres)
- Buffer zone: 1,245.6 ha (3,078 acres)

Nesebar (often transcribed as Nessebar and sometimes as Nesebur, Bulgarian: Несебър, pronounced [nɛˈsɛbɐr]) is an ancient city and one of the major seaside resorts on the Bulgarian Black Sea Coast, located in Burgas Province. It is the administrative centre of the homonymous Nesebar Municipality. Often referred to as the "Pearl of the Black Sea", Nesebar is a rich city-museum defined by more than three millennia of ever-changing history. The small city exists in two parts separated by a narrow human-made isthmus with the ancient part of the settlement on the peninsula (previously an island), and the more modern section (i.e., hotels and later development) on the mainland side. The older part bears evidence of occupation by a variety of different civilisations over the course of its existence.

It is one of the most prominent tourist destinations and seaports on the Black Sea, in what has become a popular area with several large resorts—the largest, Sunny Beach, is situated immediately to the north of Nesebar.

Nesebar has on several occasions found itself on the frontier of a threatened empire, and as such it is a town with a rich history. Due to the city's abundance of historic buildings, UNESCO came to include Nesebar in its list of World Heritage Sites in 1983.

As of December 2019, the town has a population of 13,600 inhabitants.

== Name ==
The settlement was known in Greek as Mesembria (Greek: Μεσημβρία), sometimes mentioned as Mesambria or Melsembria, the latter meaning the city of Melsas. According to a reconstruction the name might derive from Thracian Melsambria. Nevertheless, the Thracian origin of that name seems to be doubtful. Moreover, the tradition pertaining to Melsas, as founder of the city is tenuous and belongs to a cycle of etymological legends abundant among Greek cities. It also appears that the story of Melsas was a latter reconstruction of the Hellenistic era, when Mesembria was an important coastal city.

Before 1934, the common Bulgarian name for the town was Месемврия, Mesemvriya. It was replaced with the current name, which was previously used in the Erkech dialect spoken close to Nesebar. Both forms are derived from the Greek Mesembria.

== History ==
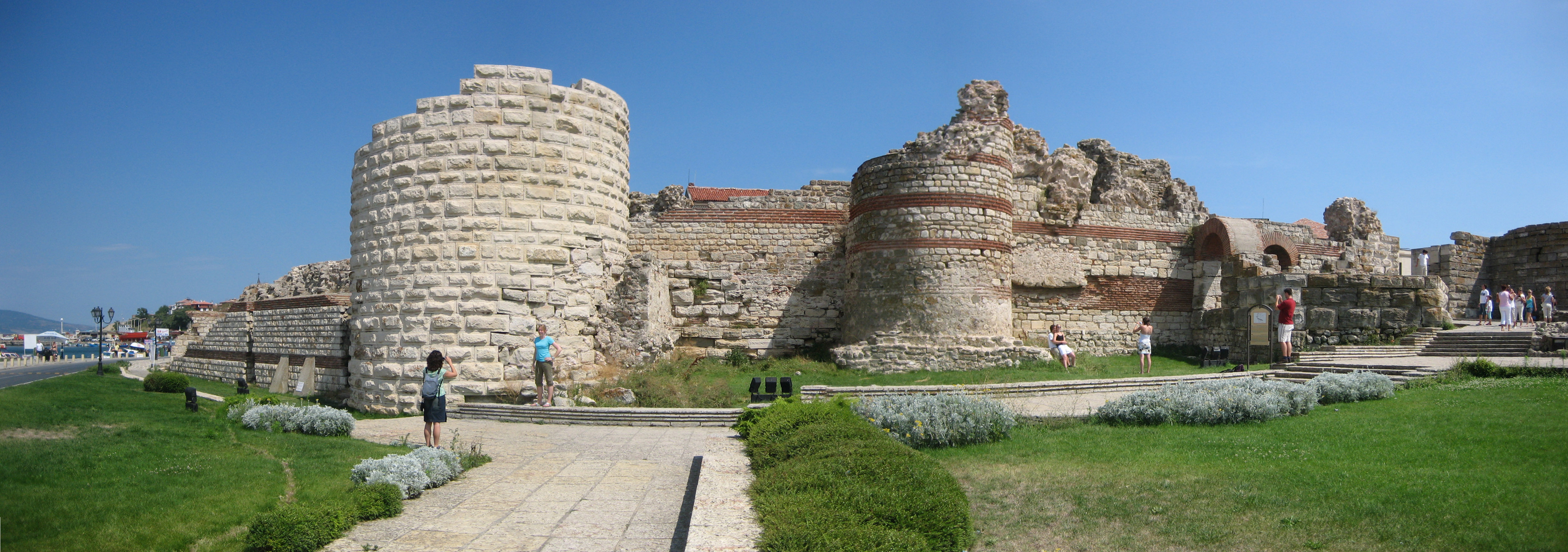
Fortifications at the entrance of Nesebar

Bulgarian archaeologist Lyuba Ognenova-Marinova led six underwater archaeological expeditions for the Bulgarian Academy of Sciences (BAS) between 1961 and 1972 in the waters along the Bulgarian Black Sea Coast. Her work led to the identification of five chronological periods of urbanization on the peninsula surrounding Nesebar through the end of the second millennium B.C., which included the Thracian protopolis, the Greek colony Mesambria, a Roman-ruled village to the Early Christian Era, the Medieval settlement and a Renaissance era town, known as Mesembria or Nessebar.

Engineering around the peninsula coastline was undertaken in 1980s both to preserve the coastline (and its historic significance) and to consolidate the area as a port.

=== Antiquity ===
Originally a Thracian settlement, known as Mesembria, the town became a Greek colony when settled by Dorians from Megara at the beginning of the 6th century BC, then known as Mesembria. It was an important trading centre from then on and a rival of Apollonia (Sozopol). It remained the only Dorian colony along the Black Sea coast, as the rest were typical Ionian colonies. At 425-424 BC the town joined the Delian League, under the leadership of Athens.

Remains date mostly from the Hellenistic period and include the acropolis, a temple of Apollo and an agora. A wall which formed part of the Thracian fortifications can still be seen on the north side of the peninsula.

Bronze and silver coins were minted in Mesembria since the 5th century BC and gold coins since the 3rd century BC. The town fell under Roman rule in 71 BC, yet continued to enjoy privileges such as the right to mint its own coinage.

=== Medieval era ===
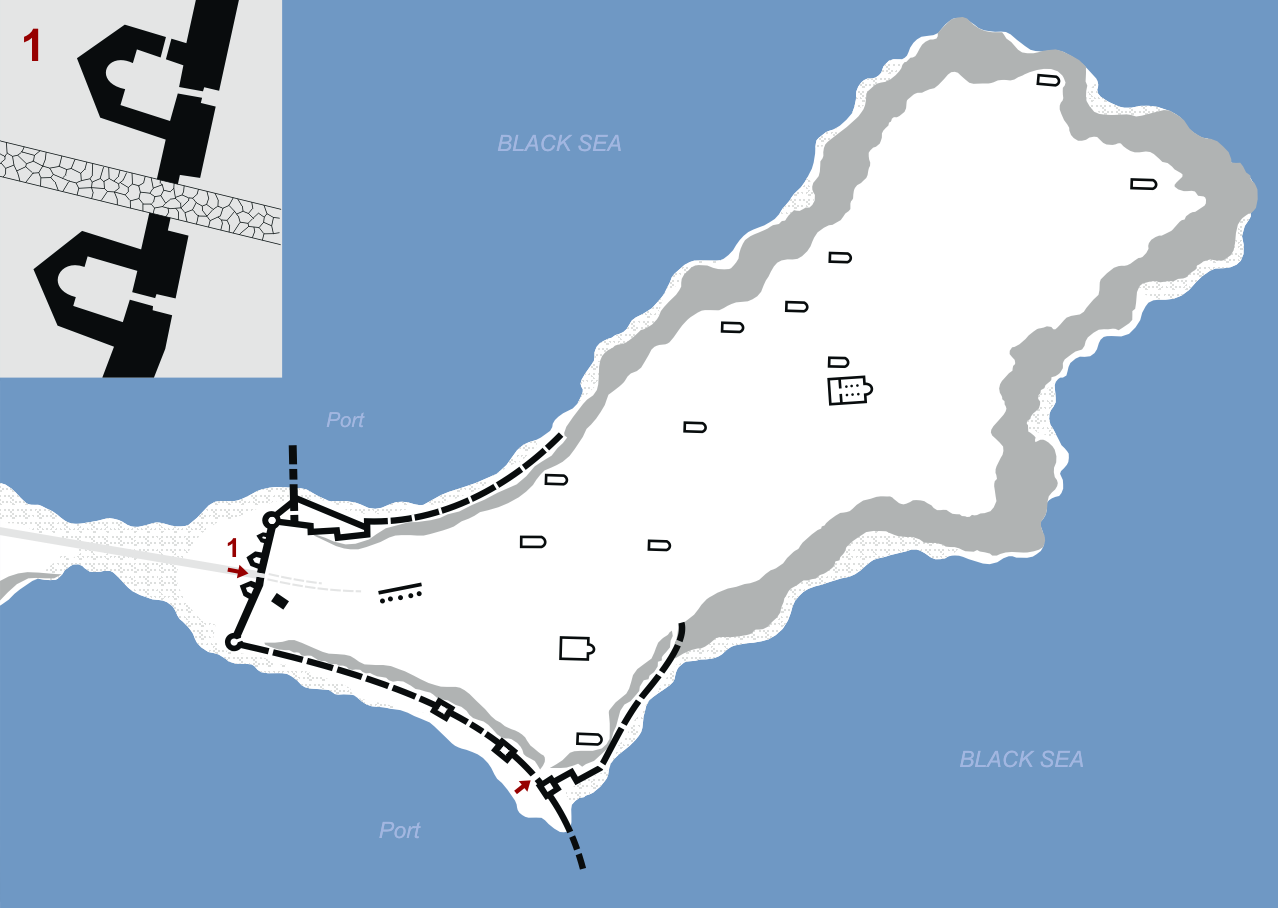
Mesembria Fortress plan

It was one of the most important strongholds of the Byzantine Empire from the 5th century AD onwards, and was fought over by Byzantines and Bulgars, being captured and incorporated in the lands of the First Bulgarian Empire in 812 by Khan Krum after a two-week siege only to be ceded back to Byzantium by Knyaz Boris I in 864 and reconquered by his son Tsar Simeon the Great. During the time of the Second Bulgarian Empire it was also contested by Bulgarian and Byzantine forces and enjoyed particular prosperity under Bulgarian tsar Ivan Alexander (1331–1371) until it was conquered by Crusaders led by Amadeus VI, Count of Savoy in 1366. The Bulgarian version of the name, Nesebar or Mesebar, has been attested since the 11th century.

Monuments from the Middle Ages include the 5–6th century Stara Mitropoliya ("old bishopric"; also St Sophia), a basilica without a transept; the 6th century church of the Virgin; and the 11th century Nova Mitropoliya ("new bishopric"; also St Stephen) which continued to be embellished until the 18th century. In the 13th and 14th century a remarkable series of churches were built: St Theodore, St Paraskeva, St Michael St Gabriel, and St John Aliturgetos.

The city was conquered by the Ottomans during the Bulgarian-Ottoman wars, but was then returned to the Byzantine Empire by the terms of the 1403 Treaty of Gallipoli.

=== Ottoman rule ===
The capture of the town by the Ottoman Empire in 1453 marked the start of its decline, but its architectural heritage remained and was enriched in the 19th century by the construction of wooden houses in style typical for the Bulgarian Black Sea Coast during this period. At the early 19th century many locals joined the Greek patriotic organization, Filiki Eteria, while at the outbreak of the Greek War of Independence (1821) part of the town's youth participated in the struggle under Alexandros Ypsilantis.

Nesebar (Misivri) was a kaza centre in İslimye sanjak of Edirne Province before 1878.

=== Third Bulgarian state ===
After the Liberation of Bulgaria from Ottoman rule in 1878, Nesebar became part of the autonomous Ottoman province of Eastern Rumelia in Burgaz department until it united with the Principality of Bulgaria in 1885. Around the end of the 19th century Nesebar was a small town of Greek fishermen and vinegrowers. In 1900 it had a population of approximately 1.900, of which 89% were Greeks, but it remained a relatively empty town. It developed as a key Bulgarian seaside resort since the beginning of the 20th century. After 1925 a new town part was built and the historic Old Town was restored.

== Churches ==
Nesebar is sometimes said to be the town with the highest number of churches per capita.^{,} Today, a total of forty churches survive, wholly or partly, in the vicinity of the town. Some of the most famous include:

- the Church of St Sophia or the Old Bishopric (Stara Mitropoliya) (5th–6th century)
- the Basilica of the Holy Mother of God Eleusa (6th century)
- the Church of John the Baptist (11th century)
- the Church of St Stephen or the New Bishopric (Nova Mitropoliya) (11th century; reconstructed in the 16th–18th century)
- the Church of St Theodore (13th century)
- the Church of St Paraskevi (13th–14th century)
- the Church of the Holy Archangels Michael and Gabriel (13th–14th century)
- the Church of Christ Pantocrator (13th–14th century)
- the Church of St John Aliturgetos (14th century)
- the Church of St Spas (17th century)
- the Church of St Clement (17th century)
- the Church Assumption of the Holy Virgin (19th century)

Whether built during the Byzantine, Bulgarian or Ottoman rule of the city, the churches of Nesebar represent the rich architectural heritage of the Eastern Orthodox world and illustrate the gradual development from Early Christian basilicas to medieval cross-domed churches.

== Sports ==
Football

The local team of PFC Nesebar participates in the Second Professional Football League. The stadium capacity is 6000 spectators, field dimensions are 100/50 m and some complementary fields are available for rent or practicing.

Tennis

There are many possibiltes to play tennis in the area during the summer season. The two main clubs with outdoor and indoor courts are TC Egalite and Tennis academy Nesebar.

== Namesakes ==
Nesebar Gap on Livingston Island in the South Shetland Islands, Antarctica is named after Nesebar.

== Gallery ==
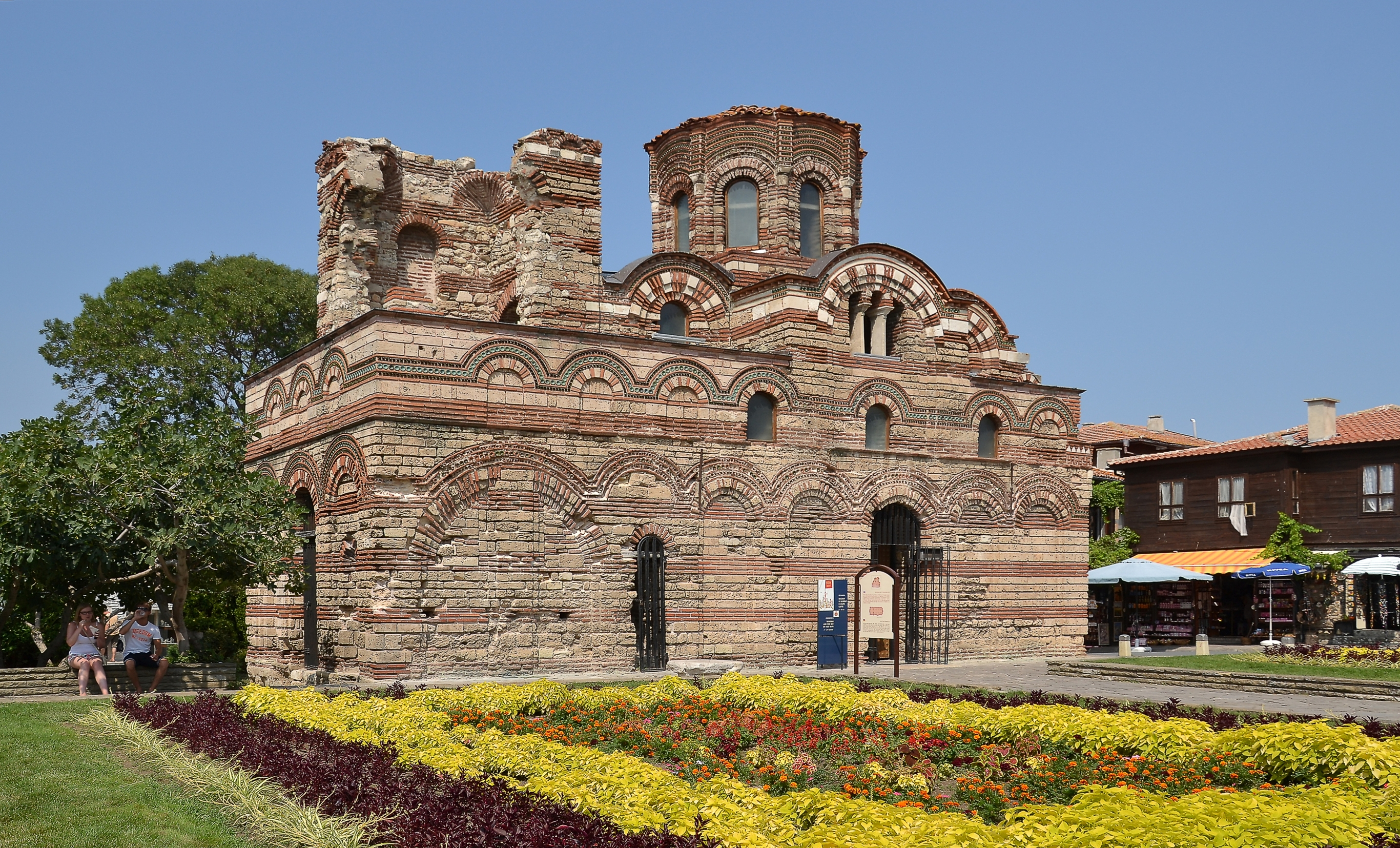
Church of Christ Pantokrator

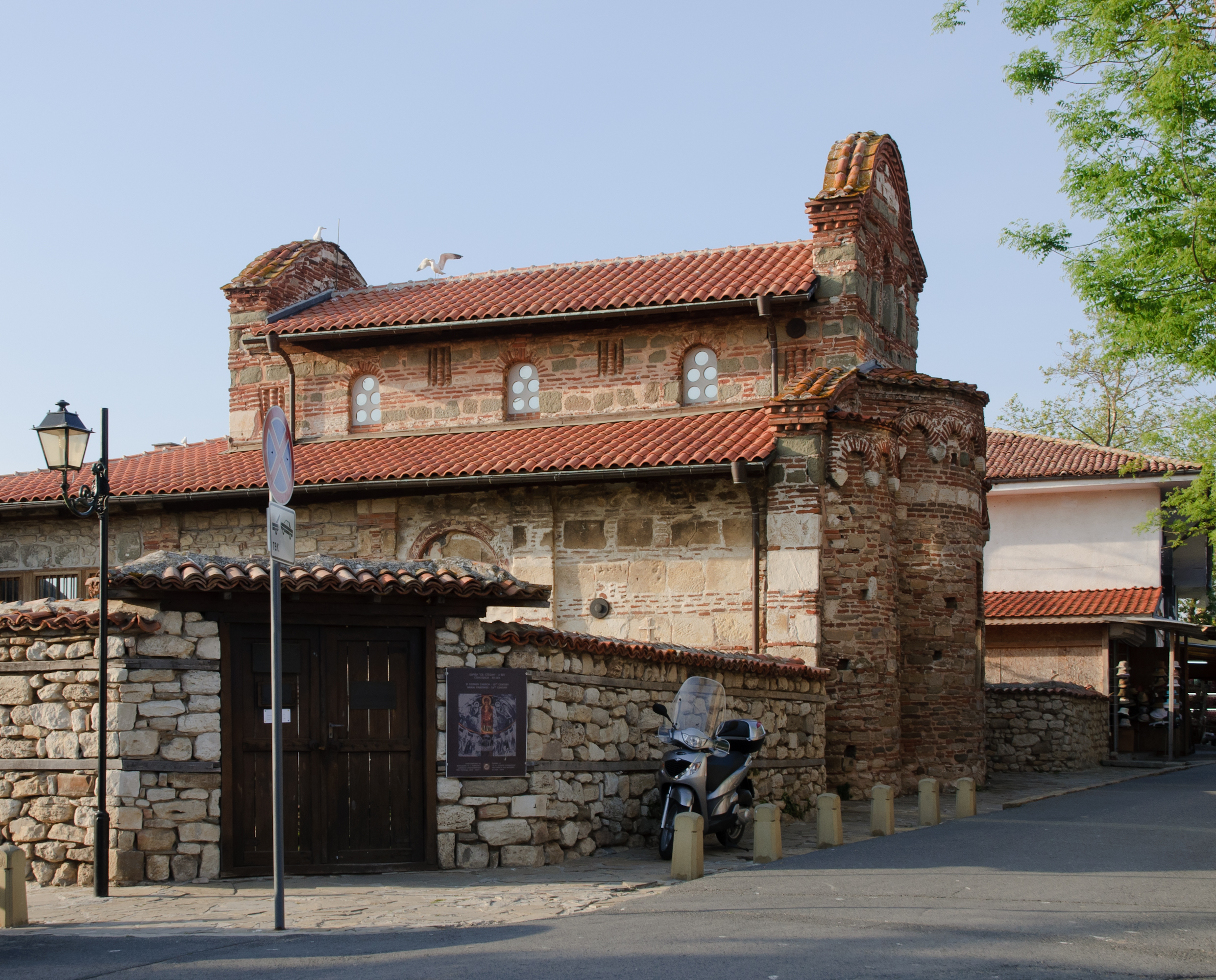
Church of St. Stephen

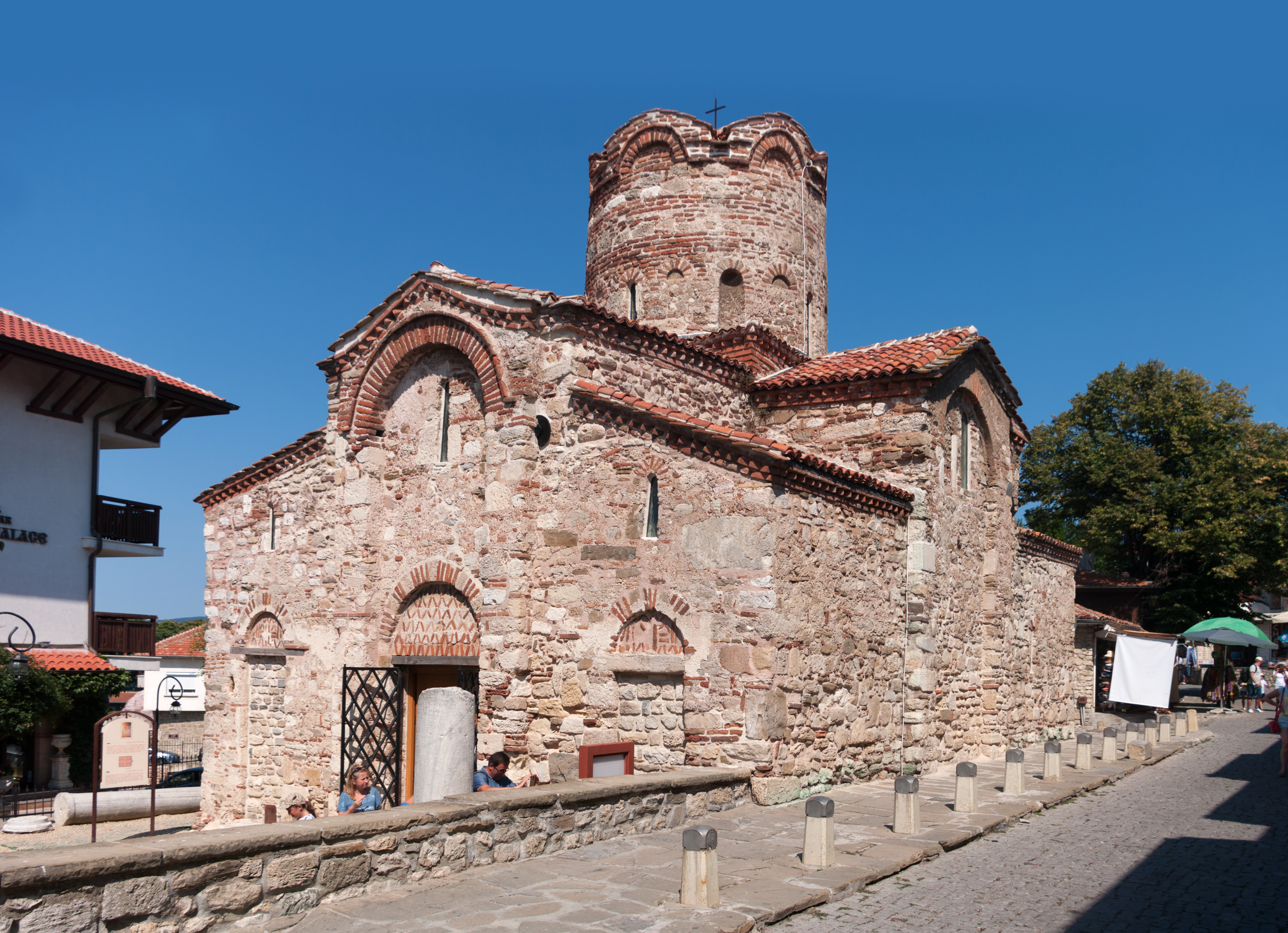
Church of St. John the Baptist

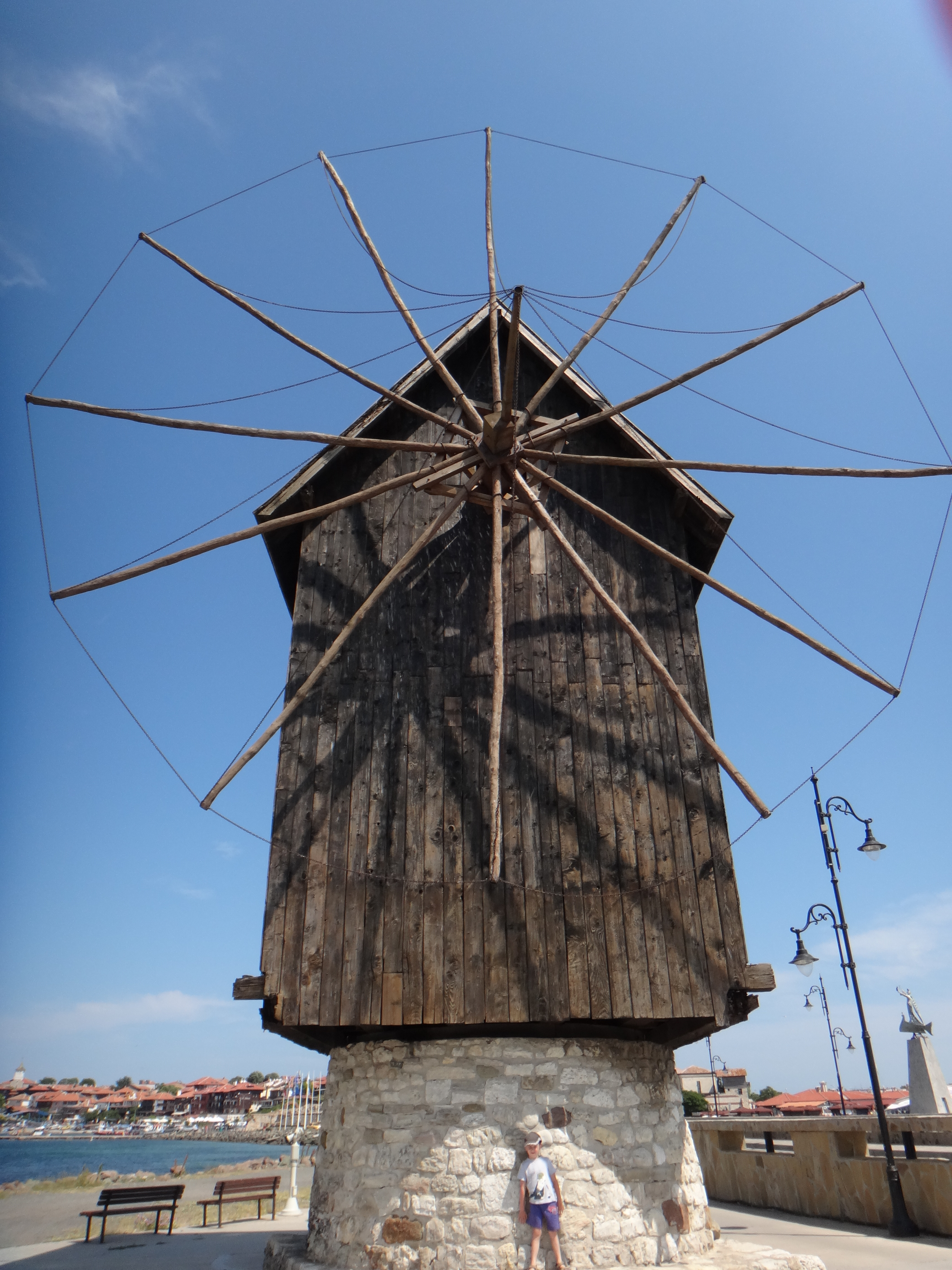
The wooden windmill before the town entrance

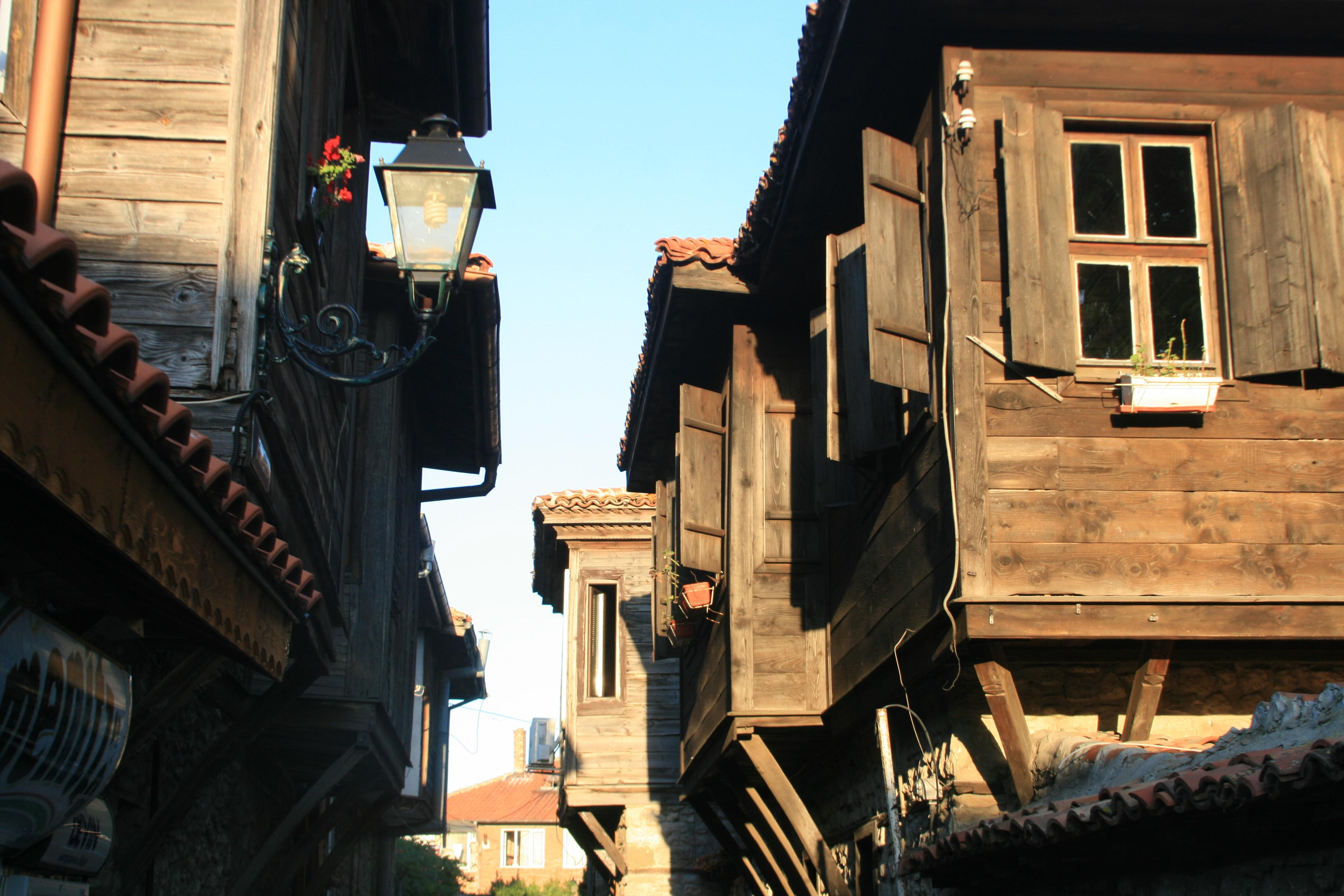
Typical revival houses in the old town

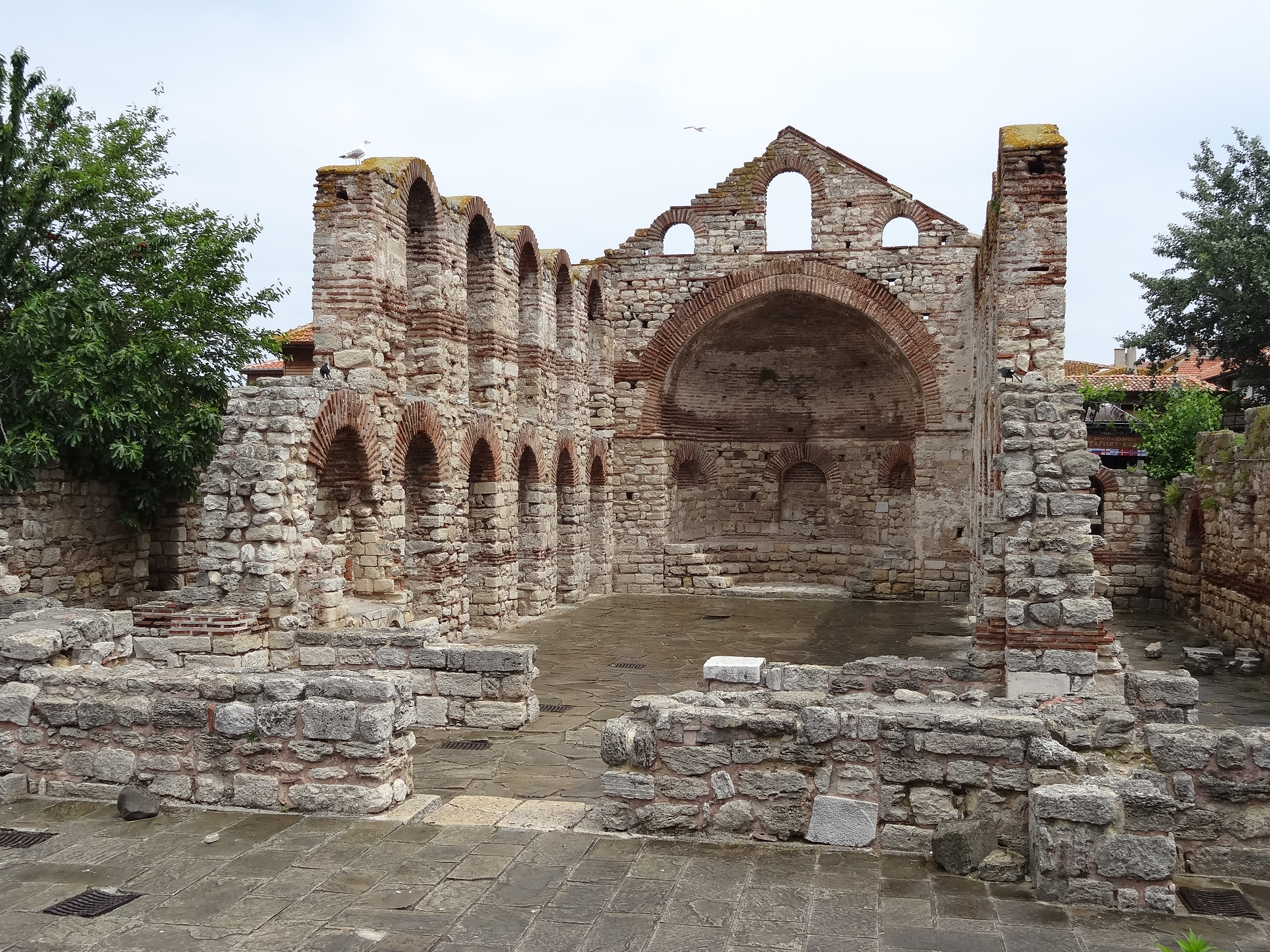
Church of St. Sophia

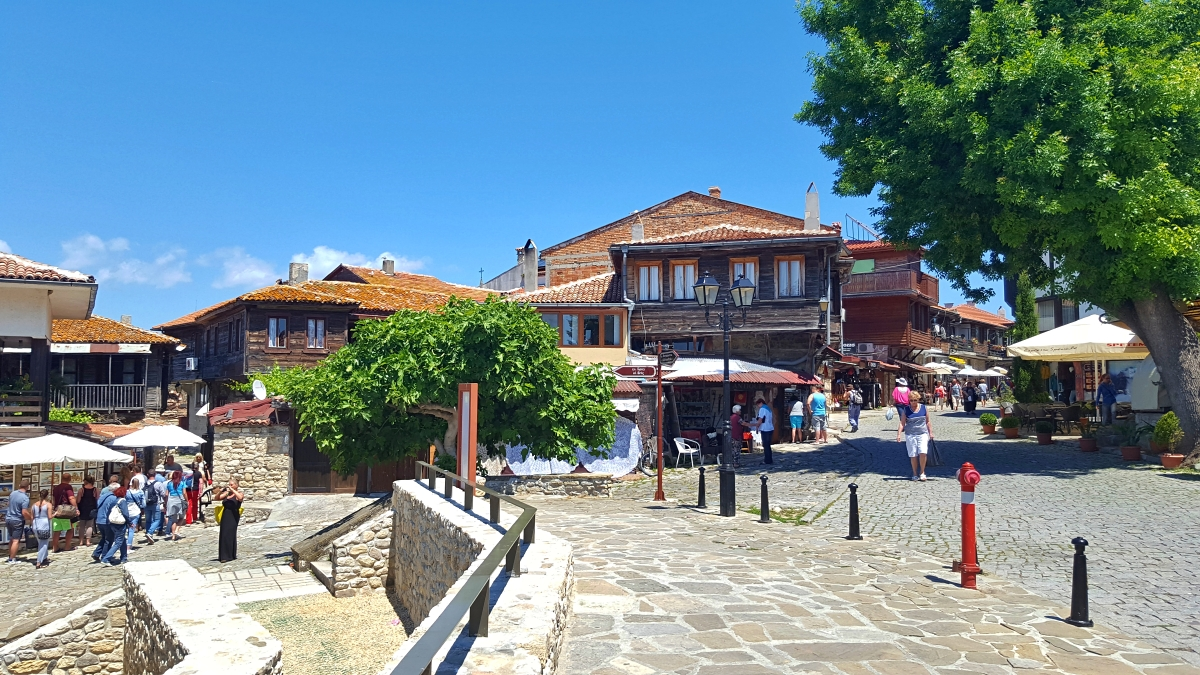
Nessebar center

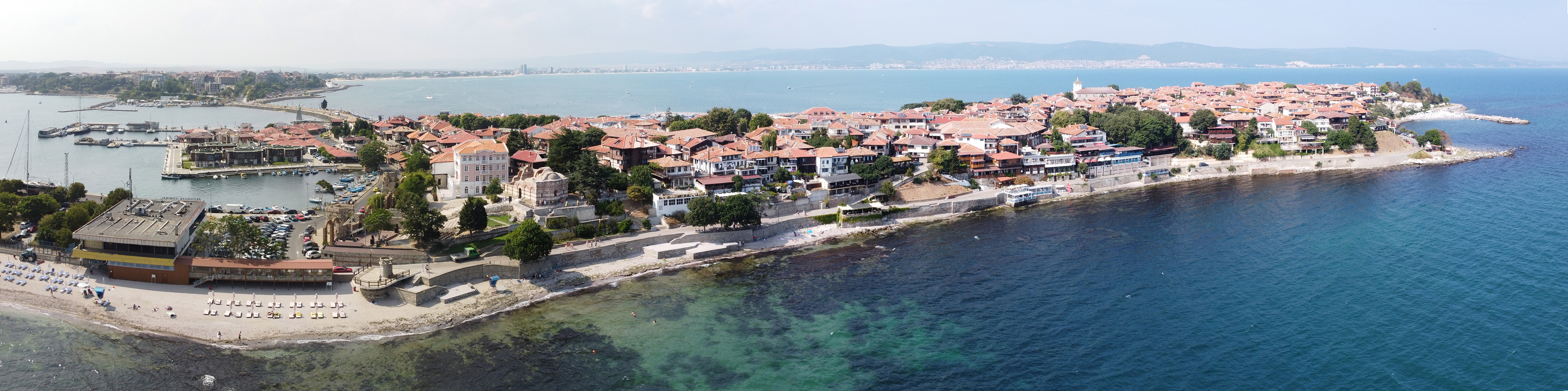
Panorama of Nesebar

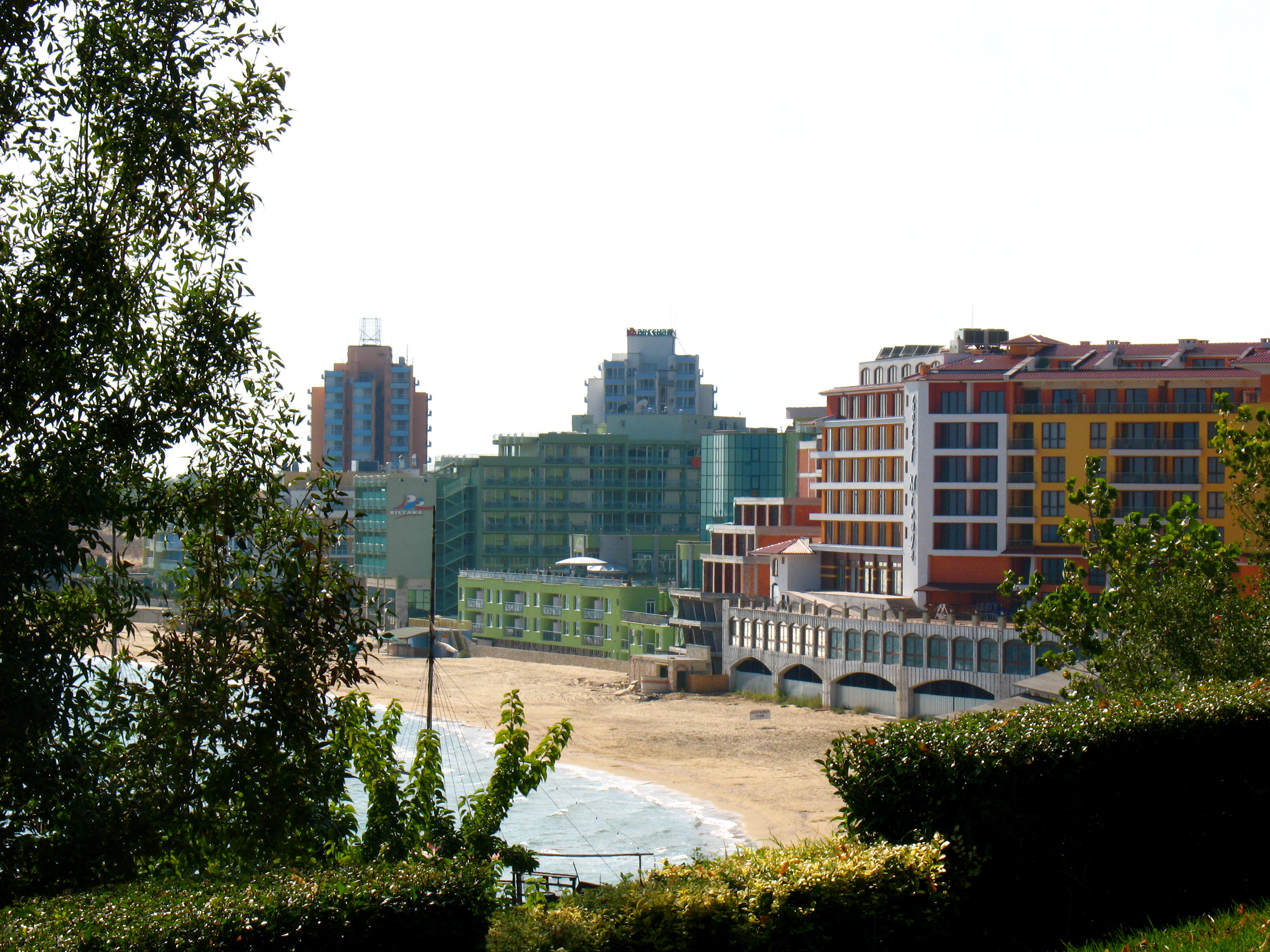
New town Nesebar

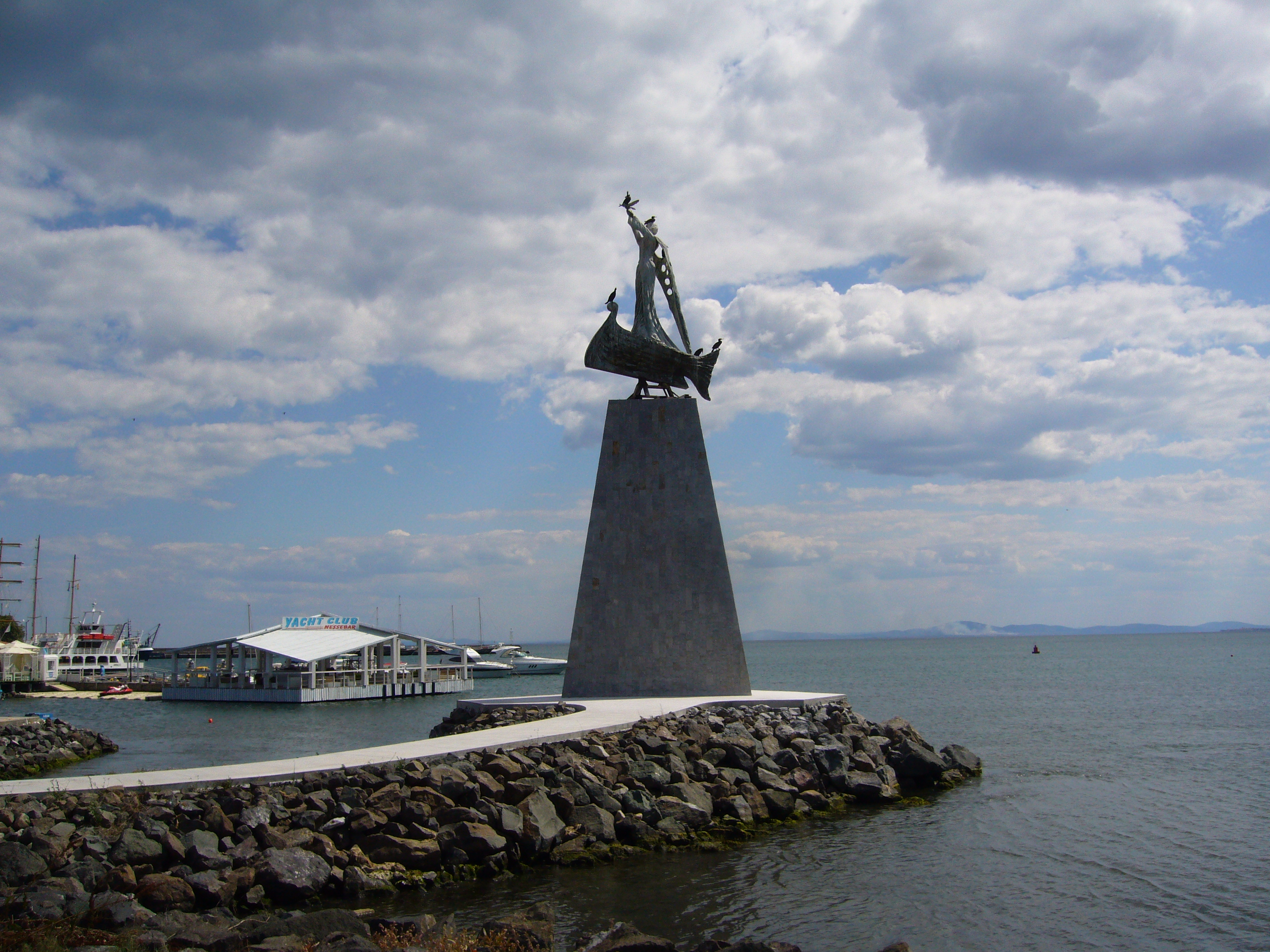
Statue of the fisherman/St. Nicholas/the new Noah

== See also ==
- Sozopol, rival city state during antiquity
- Norilsk, Twin City of Nesebar
