= Church of St John Aliturgetos =

Ancient ruins

Coordinates: 42°39′26″N 27°43′59″E

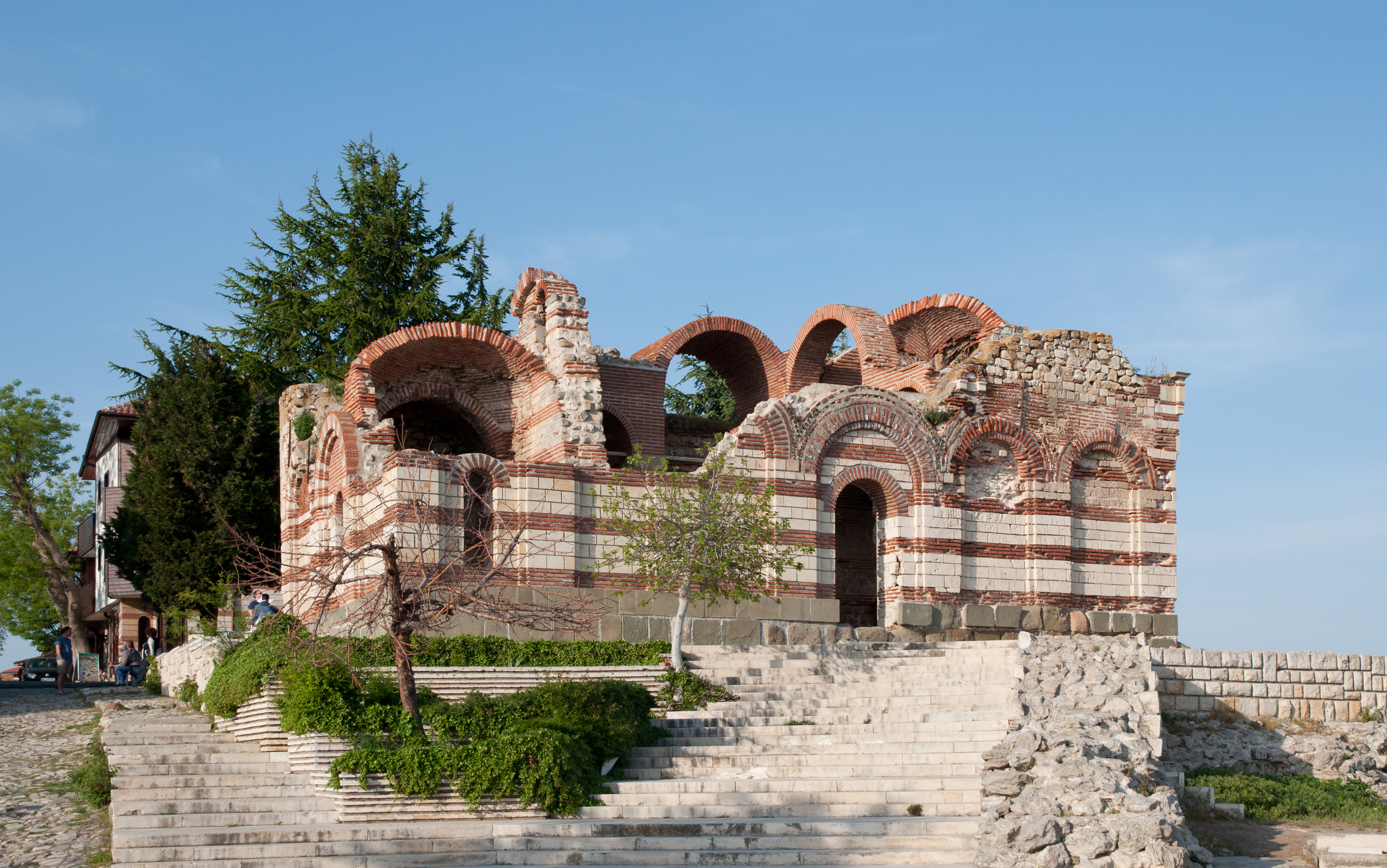
Church of St John Aliturgetos (14th century)

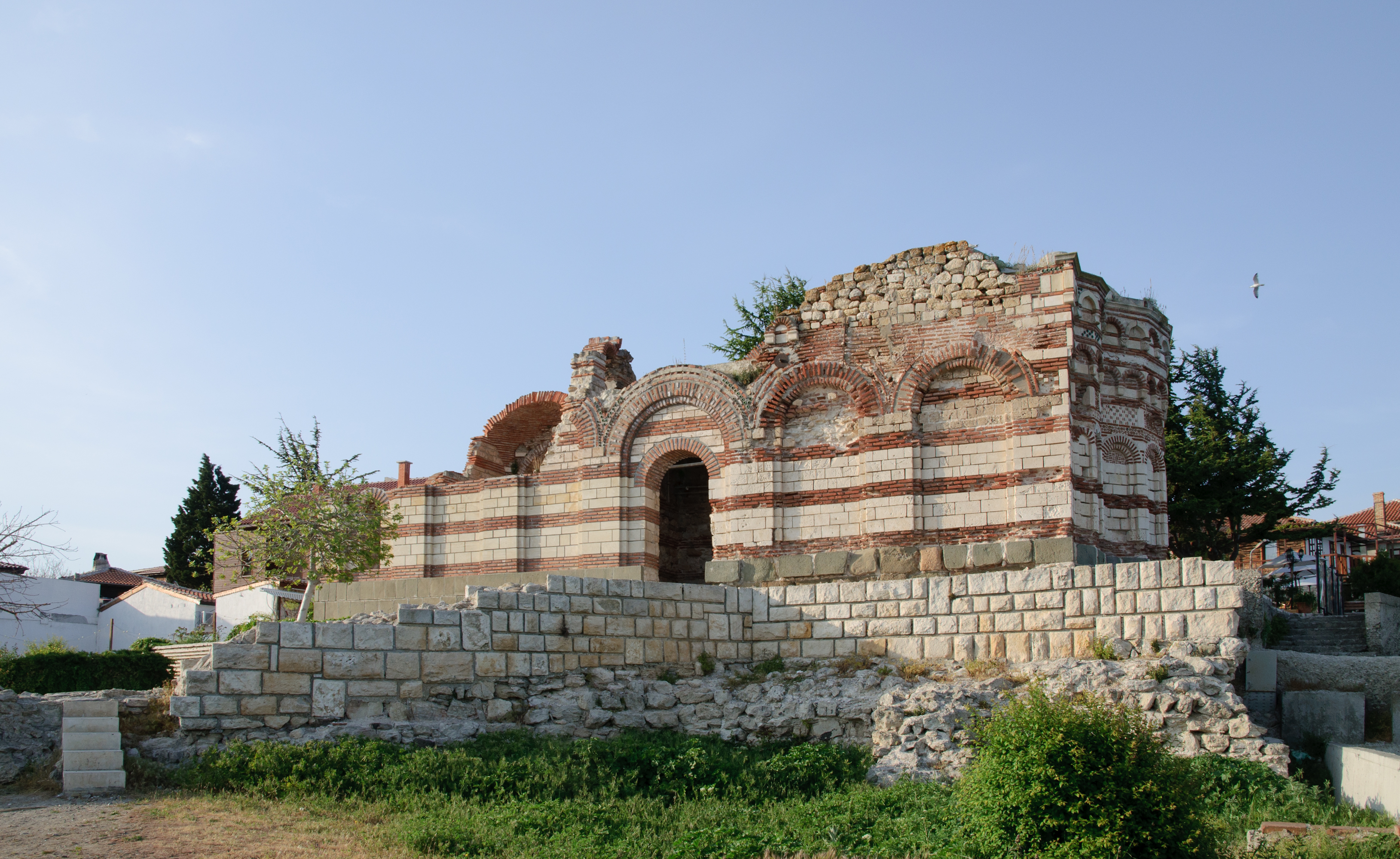

The Church of St John Aliturgetos is located in Nesebar, Bulgaria. It was built in the 14th century.

== History ==
The church was not consecrated, hence the name - "aliturgetos" (αλειτούργητος) is the Greek for "not consecrated". The legend says that one of the builders fell down and was killed. The church canon did not allow a place where a man had been killed to be used for worship, but according to some records services were held in it.

The church was badly damaged during the 1913 Chirpansko earthquake.

== Architecture ==
It is a domed cruciform church with three altar apses and a narthex. It is 18.5 m long and 10 m wide. The base of the cruciform part of the church is almost quadrangular, shaped by four columns.

It has mixed stone and brick masonry. The facade walls are segmented by blind two-step niches decorated with various geometrical patterns from bricks and stone cubes (ceramic plastic style). It has two entrances, from the north and south, which is rare in the architecture of church buildings.
