= Church of Saint John the Baptist, Nesebar =

Church in Burgas, Bulgaria

Coordinates: 42°39′32″N 27°44′2″E

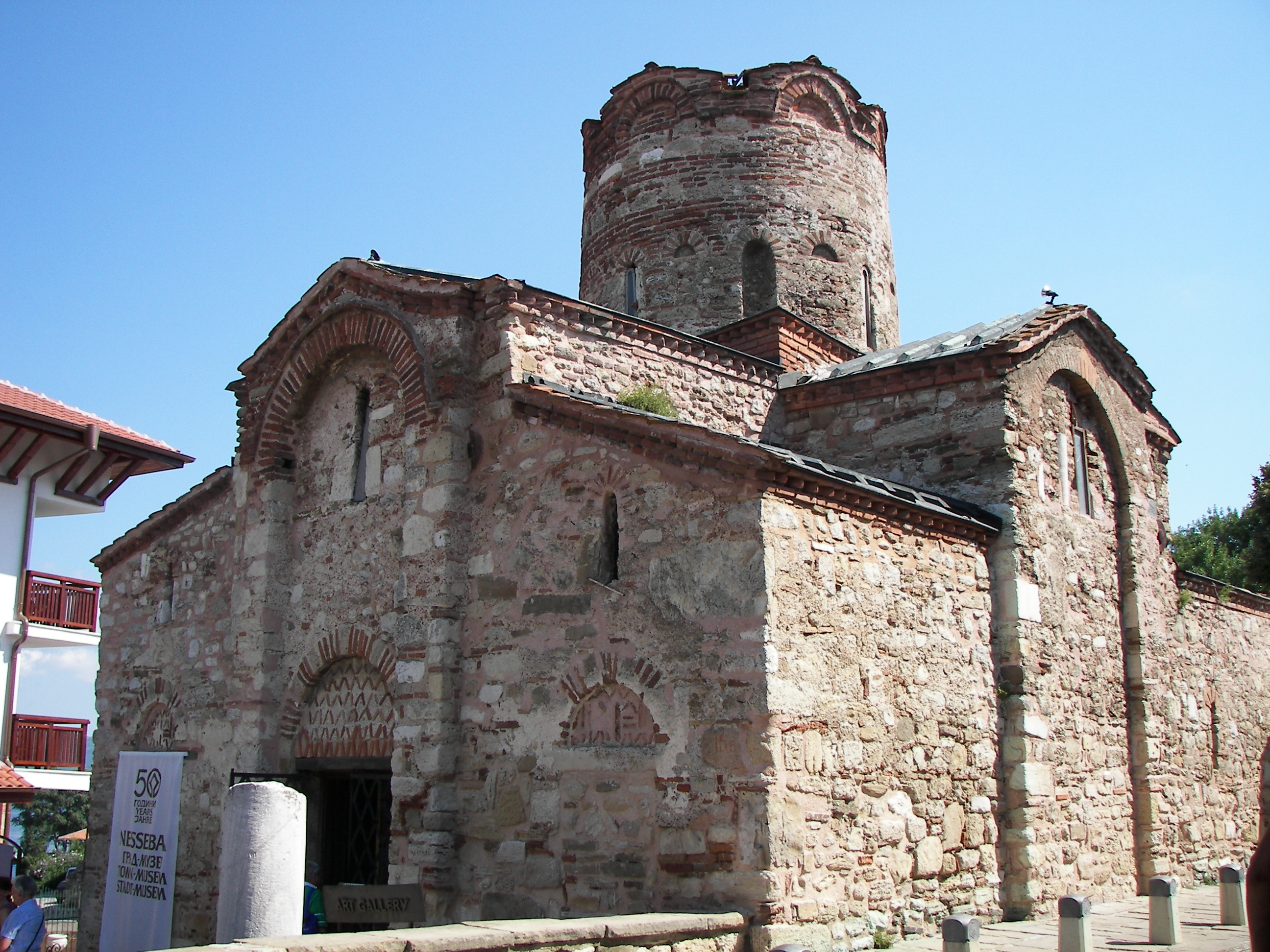
The Church of St. John the Baptist dates from the 11th century.

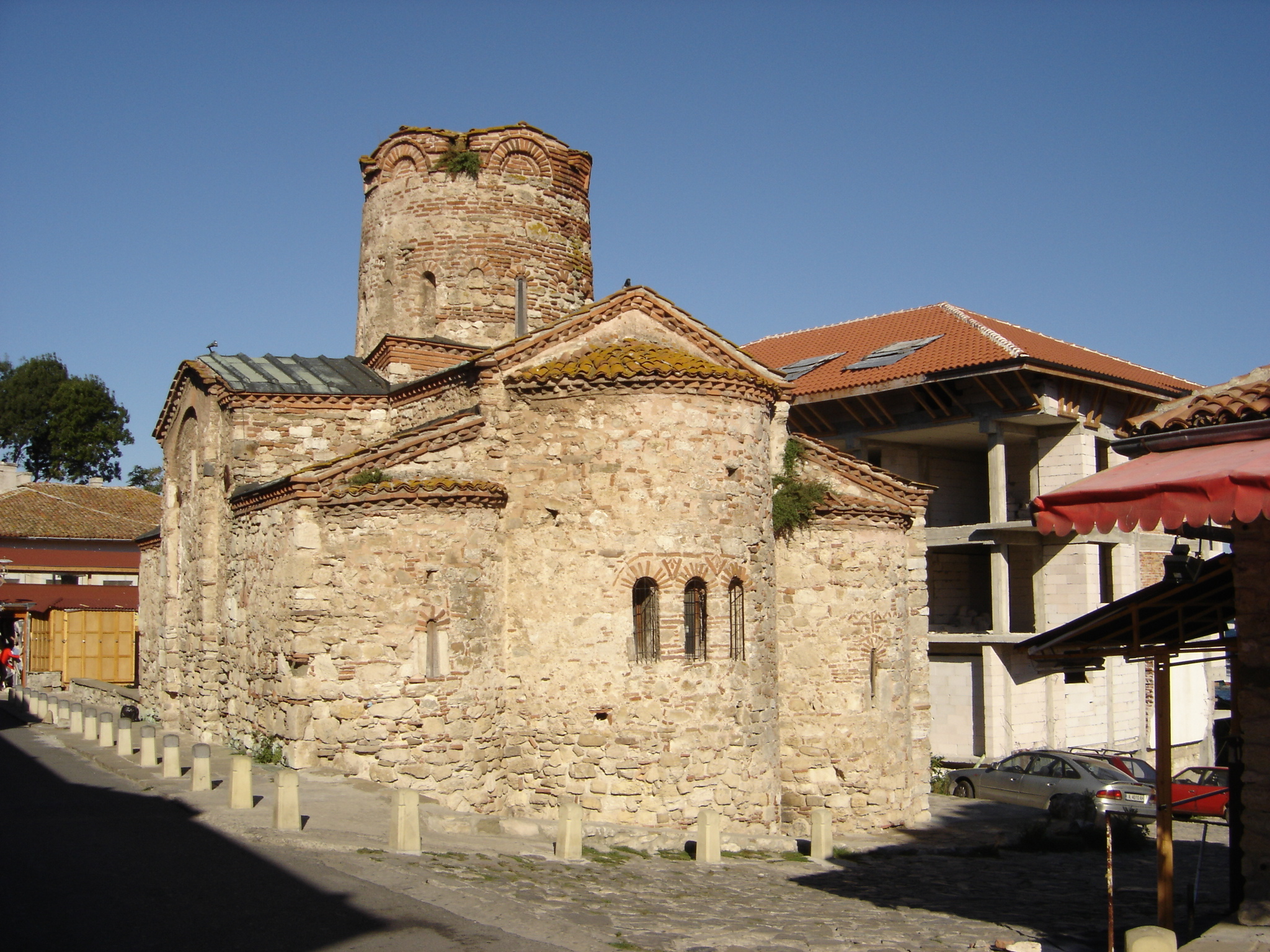
Apse view

The Church of St. John the Baptist is a cruciform church located in Nesebar, Bulgaria.

== Description ==
The Church of St. John the Baptist is a domed cruciform church, built of undressed stone. It is one of the best preserved churches in Nessebar. It is 12 meters long and 10 meters wide. The structure of the church consists of two cylindrical vaults which intersect in the center of the composition. The masonry is crushed stone and pebbles and the facades were probably smoothly plastered. It was built in the 11th century. It has no narthex. The altar space consists of three semi-circular apses. Four massive pillars support the dome and form the cross. Inside the church the walls are smooth and unbroken. The exterior is simple without decorative niches and ceramic plaques, typical of the ornamental style. Bricks were used as a decorative element over the entrance, in the jagged cornices and around the windows.

Some frescoes in the church have been preserved dating from later periods. The faded portraits of the donor and his contemporaries on the southern wall and the fragments beneath the dome date from the 14th century and the others are from the 16th and 17th centuries.
