= Church of the Holy Saviour, Nesebar =

Church building in Nesebar, Bulgaria

Coordinates: 42°39′34″N 27°44′5″E

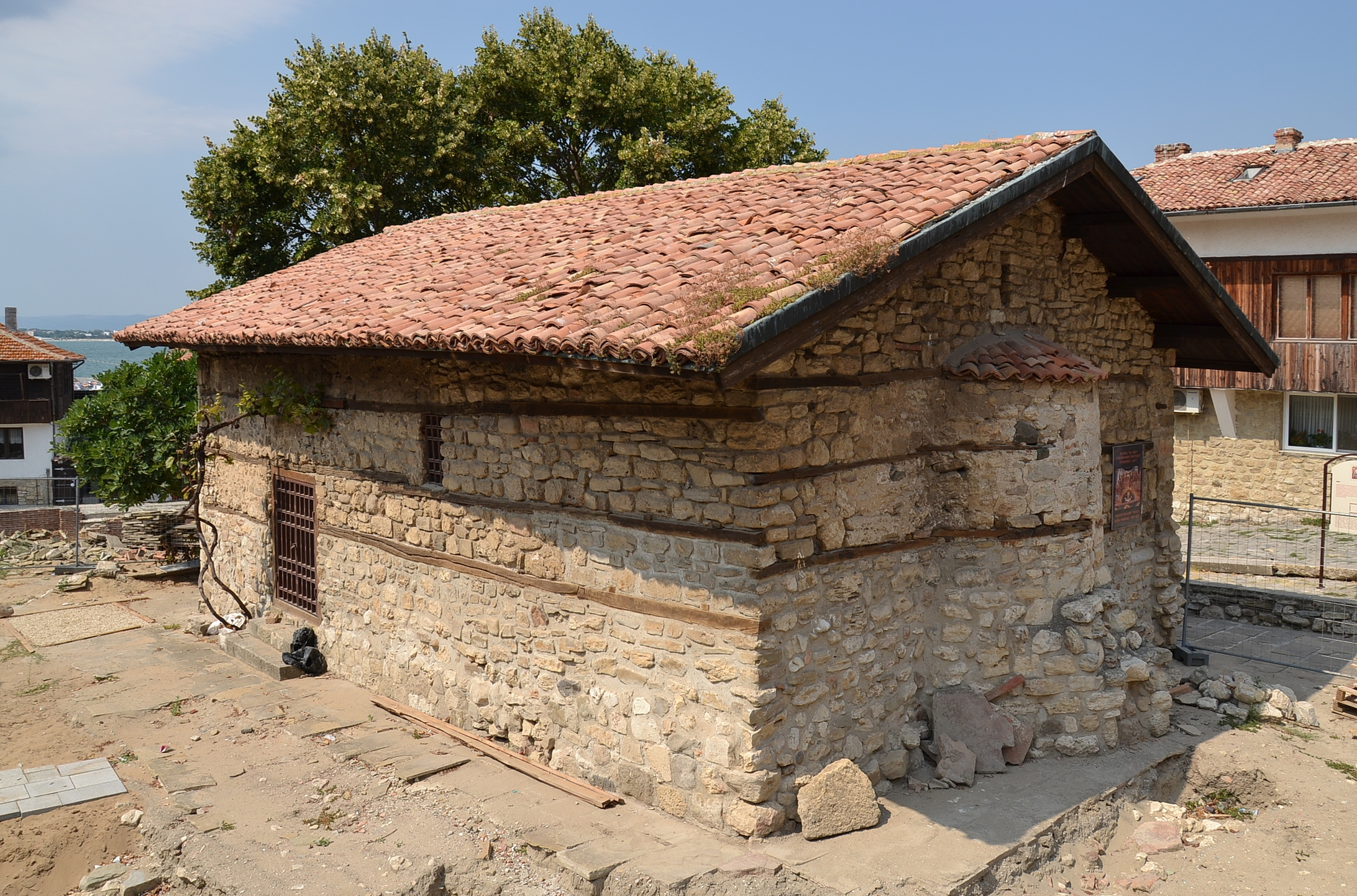
Church of the Holy Saviour

The Church of the Holy Saviour or Sveti Spas in the UNESCO World Heritage town of Nesebar, Bulgaria, is a 17th-century church building of 1609, 11.70 m long and 5.70 m wide, consisting of a single nave and apse.

Although small, it is notable for its early 17th century wall paintings representing scenes from the Life of Christ and the Holy Virgin, with a painting of the Virgin Platytera in the apse.

The tombstone of the Byzantine princess Mataissa Cantacuzina, formerly here, is now in the Nesebar Archaeological Museum. The church itself is de-consecrated and is also used as a museum.
