= Church of St Theodore, Nesebar =

Church in Nesebar, Bulgaria

Coordinates: 42°39′35.8″N 27°44′19.93″E

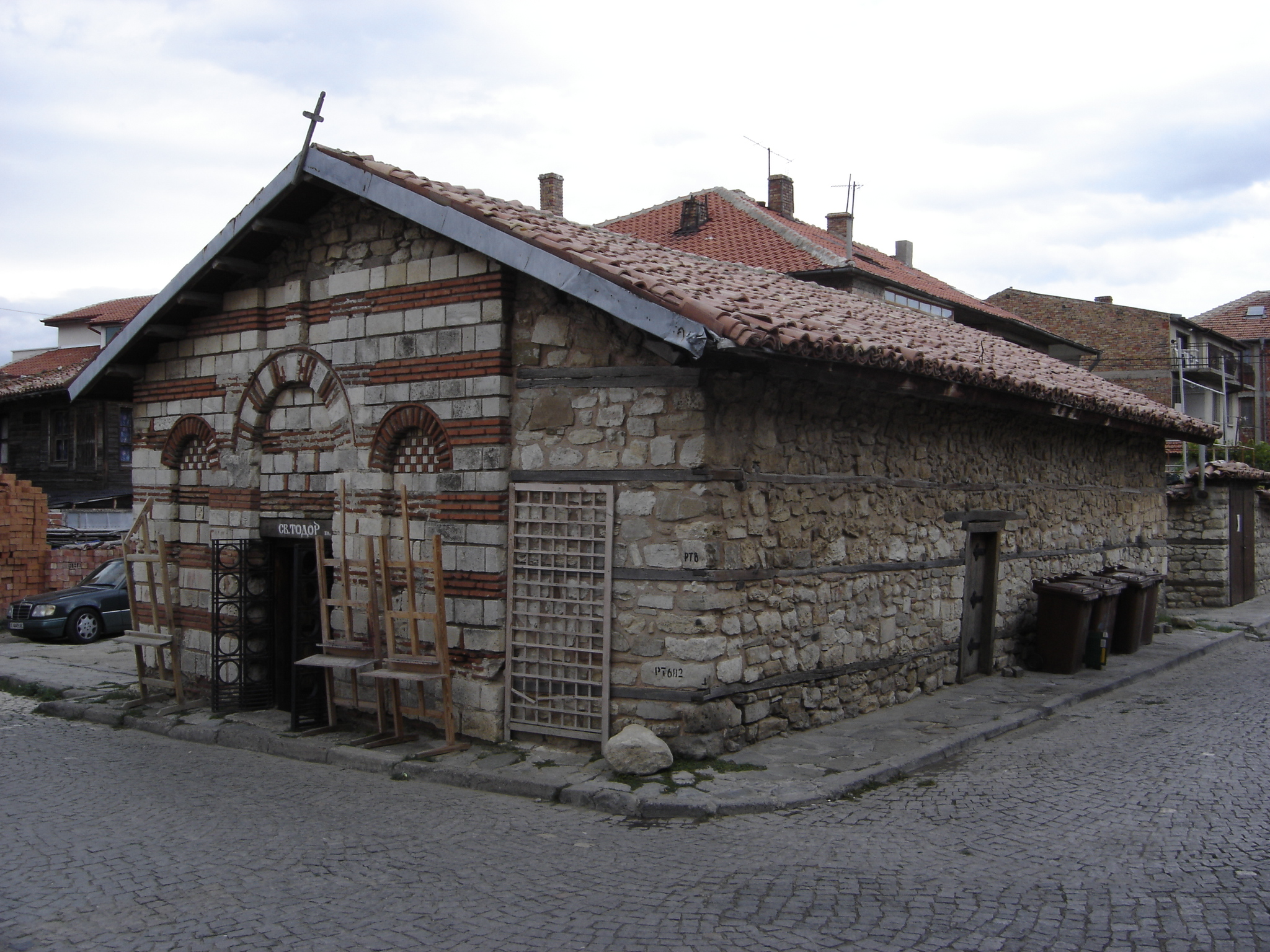

The Church of St Theodore in Nesebar, Bulgaria, was built in the 13th century, and the north and western façades survive from this era. The other walls and the roof were built later. It is a single nave church with a narthex and apse. The church is 8.70 m long and wide 4.15 m wide.

The façade is decorated with blind arches of worked stone and brick. The space under the arches is ornamented with staggered zigzag patterns of stone blocks and bricks.
