= King Peter =

King Peter may refer to:

Noble / Religious hierarchs:

- Peter I (disambiguation), multiple people
- Peter II (disambiguation), multiple people
- Peter III (disambiguation), multiple people
- Peter IV (disambiguation), multiple people
- Peter V (disambiguation), multiple people
- Peter VI of Alexandria
- Peter VII of Alexandria (disambiguation)
- Zolu Duma a.k.a. 'King Peter'; Gola tribal leader in land that became Liberia.

Fictional characters:

- Peter Pevensie
