= Byzantine–Bulgarian wars =

Conflicts in the Balkans (499–1355)

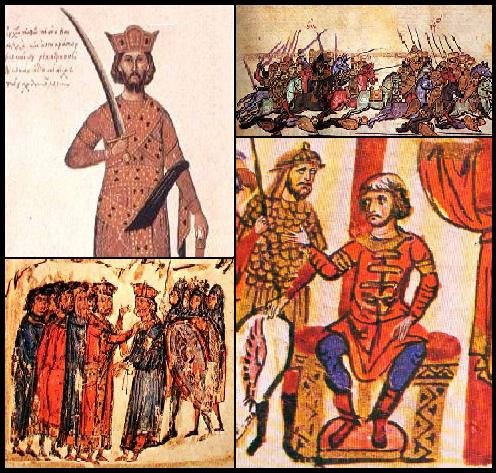
- Clockwise from top-left: Emperor Nikephoros II Phokas; The Battle of Anchialus; Khan Omurtag; The rulers of Bulgaria and Byzantium negotiate for peace.
Date	499–1355 (856 years)
Location	Balkan Peninsula
Territorial changes	Both states had numerous territorial changes.

Belligerents
First Bulgarian Empire; Second Bulgarian Empire	Byzantine Empire

The Byzantine–Bulgarian wars were a series of conflicts fought between the Byzantine Empire and the Bulgarian Empire which began already in the late 5th century when the Bulgars defeated a 15.000 Roman army led by Magister Aristus (499 AD). The Bulgars permanently conquered parts of the Balkan Peninsula after 680 AD. The Byzantine and First Bulgarian Empire continued to clash over the next century with varying success, until the Bulgarians, led by Krum, inflicted a series of crushing defeats on the Byzantines. After Krum died in 814, his son Omurtag negotiated a thirty-year peace treaty. Simeon I had multiple successful campaigns against the Byzantines during his rule from 893 to 927. His son Peter I negotiated another long-lasting peace treaty. His rule was followed by a period of decline of the Bulgarian state.

In 971 John I Tzimiskes, the Byzantine emperor, subjugated much of the weakening Bulgarian Empire by defeating Boris II and capturing Preslav, the Bulgarian capital. Samuel managed to stabilize the Bulgarian state with its center around the town of Prespa. Near the end of his rule, the Byzantines regained the upper hand, and under Basil II they won the Battle of Kleidion and completely conquered Bulgaria in 1018. There were rebellions against Byzantine rule from 1040 to 1041, and in the 1070s and the 1080s, but these failed. In 1185, however, Theodore Peter and Ivan Asen started a revolt, and the weakening Byzantine Empire, facing internal dynastic troubles of its own, was unable to quash the revolt.

After the army of the Fourth Crusade conquered Constantinople in 1204, Kaloyan, the Bulgarian emperor, tried to establish friendly relations with the crusaders. However, the newly created Latin Empire spurned any offer of alliance with the Bulgarians. Because of his cold reception, Kaloyan allied with the Nicaeans, which reduced the crusaders' power in the area. Although his nephew Boril allied with the Latin Empire, Boril's successors sided with the Nicaeans, despite a few continuing attacks from them. After the Latin Empire collapsed, the Byzantines, took advantage of the Bulgarian civil war and captured portions of Thrace, however the Bulgarian emperor Theodore Svetoslav retook these lands. The Byzantine-Bulgarian relations continued to fluctuate until the Ottoman Turks captured the Bulgarian capital in 1393 and the Byzantine capital in 1453.

== Asparuh's war ==
The Byzantines first clashed with the founders of Bulgaria (the Bulgars) when Khan Kubrat's youngest son Asparuh moved westward, occupying today's southern Bessarabia. Asparuh defeated the Byzantines, who were under Constantine IV, with a combined land and sea operation and successfully besieged their fortified camp in Ongala. Suffering from bad health, the emperor had to leave the army, which allowed itself to panic and be defeated by the Bulgars. In 681 Constantine was forced to acknowledge the Bulgarian state in Moesia and to pay protection money to avoid further inroads into Byzantine Thrace. Eight years later, Asparuh led a successful campaign against Byzantine Thrace.

== Tervel's wars ==
Tervel, first mentioned in the Byzantine texts in 704 when the deposed emperor Justinian II came to him and asked for his aid, supported Justinian in an attempted restoration to the Byzantine throne in exchange for friendship, gifts and his daughter's hand in marriage. With an army of 15,000 horsemen provided by Tervel, Justinian suddenly advanced on Constantinople and managed to gain entrance into the city in 705. The restored emperor executed his supplanters, the emperors Leontios and Tiberios III, alongside many of their supporters. Justinian rewarded Tervel with many gifts, the title of kaisar (Caesar), which made him second only to the emperor and the first foreign ruler in Byzantine history to receive such a title, and possibly a territorial concession in northeastern Thrace, a region called Zagore. Whether Justinian's daughter Anastasia was married to Tervel as had been arranged is unknown.

A mere three years later Justinian II himself violated this arrangement and apparently commenced military operations to recover the ceded area. Tervel routed him at the Battle of Anchialus (or Ankhialo) in 708. In 711, faced by a major revolt in Asia Minor, Justinian again sought the aid of Tervel but received only lukewarm support manifested in an army of 3,000. Outmaneuvered by the rebel emperor Philippicus, Justinian was captured and executed, while his Bulgar allies were allowed to retire to their country. Tervel took advantage of the disorder in Byzantium to raid Thrace in 712, plundering as far as the vicinity of Constantinople.

According to the chronological information of the Imennik, Tervel died in 715. However, the Byzantine chronicler Theophanes the Confessor ascribes Tervel a role in an attempt to restore the deposed Emperor Anastasius II in 718 or 719. If Tervel did survive this long, he was the Bulgarian ruler who concluded a new treaty with Emperor Theodosius III in 716 (confirming the annual tribute paid by the Byzantines to Bulgaria and the territorial concessions in Thrace, as well as regulating commercial relations and the treatment of political refugees), and he was also the Bulgarian ruler who helped relieve the second Arab siege of Constantinople in 717–718 by land. According to Theophanes, the Bulgars slaughtered some 22,000 Arabs in the battle.

== Constantine V's wars ==
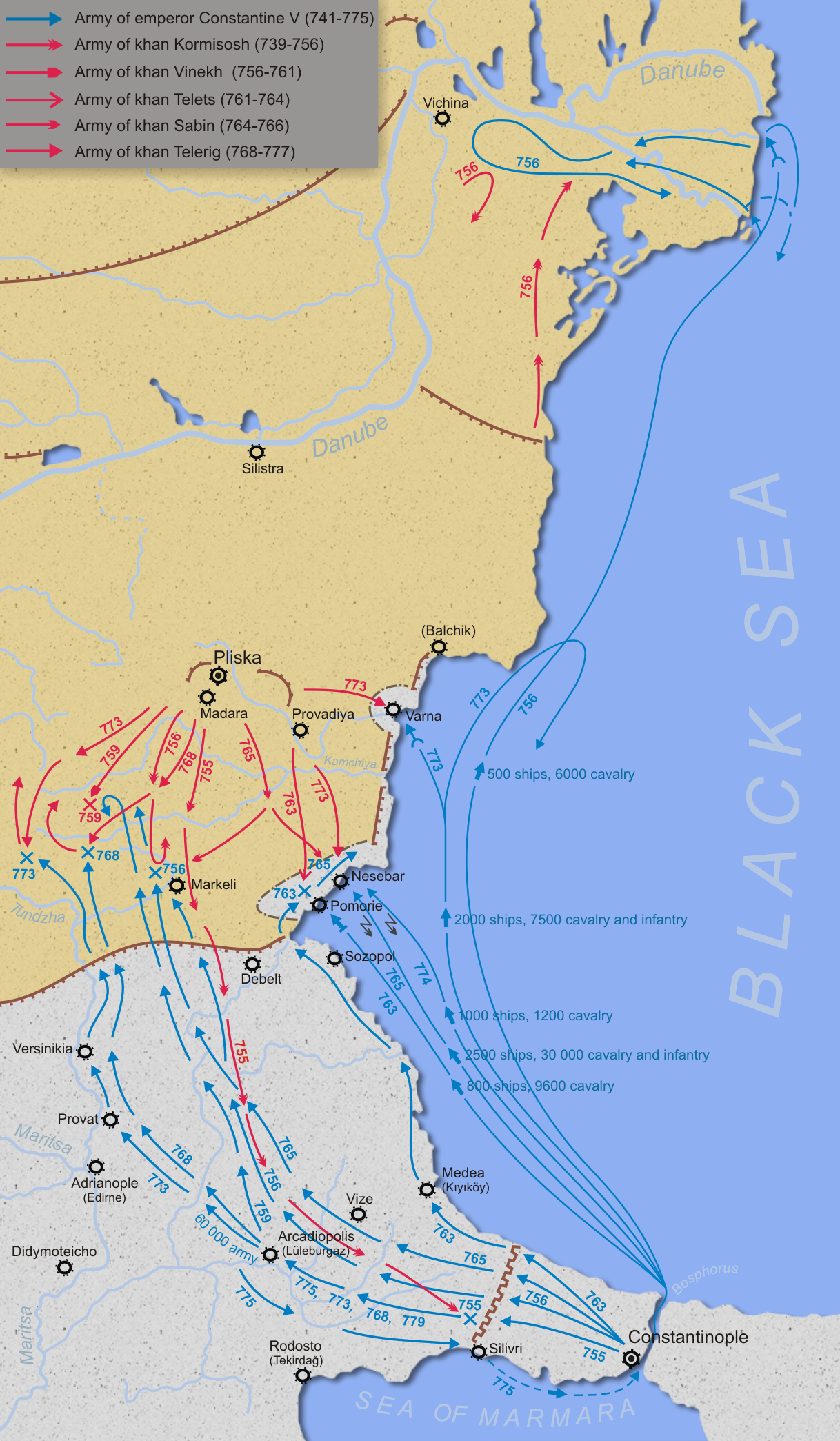
Byzantine–Bulgarian Wars (741–775)

After the death of Sevar, Bulgaria descended into a long period of crisis and unrest, while the Byzantines consolidated their positions. Between 756 and 775, the new Byzantine Emperor Constantine V led nine campaigns against his northern neighbour to establish a Byzantine border on the Danube. Due to the frequent changes of rulers (eight khans held the throne in twenty years) and the constant political crisis, Bulgaria was on the verge of destruction.

In his first campaign in 756, Constantine V was successful and managed to defeat the Bulgars twice, but in 759, Vinekh, the Bulgar Khan, defeated the Byzantine army comprehensively in the Battle of the Rishki Pass. Vinekh then sought to make peace with the Byzantines but was assassinated by Bulgar nobles. The new ruler, Telets, was defeated at the Battle of Anchialus in 763. During their next campaigns, both sides failed to gain significant success because the Byzantines could not pass through the Balkan Mountains, and their fleet was destroyed twice in heavy storms (2,600 ships sank in just one of the storms in 765). In 774, they defeated an inferior Bulgarian force at Berzitia, but this was the last success of Constantine V: as a result of their defeat, the Bulgars took serious precautions to get rid of the Byzantine spies in Pliska. Khan Telerig sent a secret emissary to Constantine V indicating his intention to flee Bulgaria and seek refuge with the emperor, and seeking assurances of hospitality. Telerig succeeded in having the emperor betray his own agents in Bulgaria, who were duly rounded up and executed. In response, Constantine V invaded Bulgaria once again, in 775, but became ill and died on his return journey to Constantinople.

== Constantine VI's failed retaliations ==
In 791, the Byzantine emperor Constantine VI embarked on an expedition against Bulgaria, in retaliation for Bulgarian incursions in the Struma valley since 789. Kardam pre-empted the Byzantine invasion and met the enemy near Adrianople in Thrace. The Byzantine army was defeated and turned to flight.

In 792, Constantine VI led another army against the Bulgars and encamped at Marcellae, near Karnobat, which he proceeded to fortify. Kardam arrived with his army on July 20 and occupied the neighboring heights. After some time passed with the two forces sizing up each other up, Constantine VI ordered the attack, but in the resulting Battle of Marcellae the Byzantine forces lost formation and were once again defeated, fleeing the field. Kardam captured the imperial tent and the emperor's servants. After his return to Constantinople, Constantine VI signed a peace treaty and agreed to pay an annual tribute to Bulgaria.

By 796, the imperial government became recalcitrant and Kardam found it necessary to demand the tribute while threatening to devastate Thrace if it were not paid. According to the chronicler Theophanes the Confessor, Constantine VI mocked the demand by having dung sent instead of gold as "fitting tribute" and promising to lead a new army against the elderly Kardam at Marcellae. Once again the emperor's army headed north, and once again it encountered Kardam in the vicinity of Adrianople. The armies faced each other for 17 days without entering into battle, while the two monarchs probably engaged in negotiations. In the end, conflict was averted and the peace resumed on the same terms as in 792.

== Khan Krum's wars ==
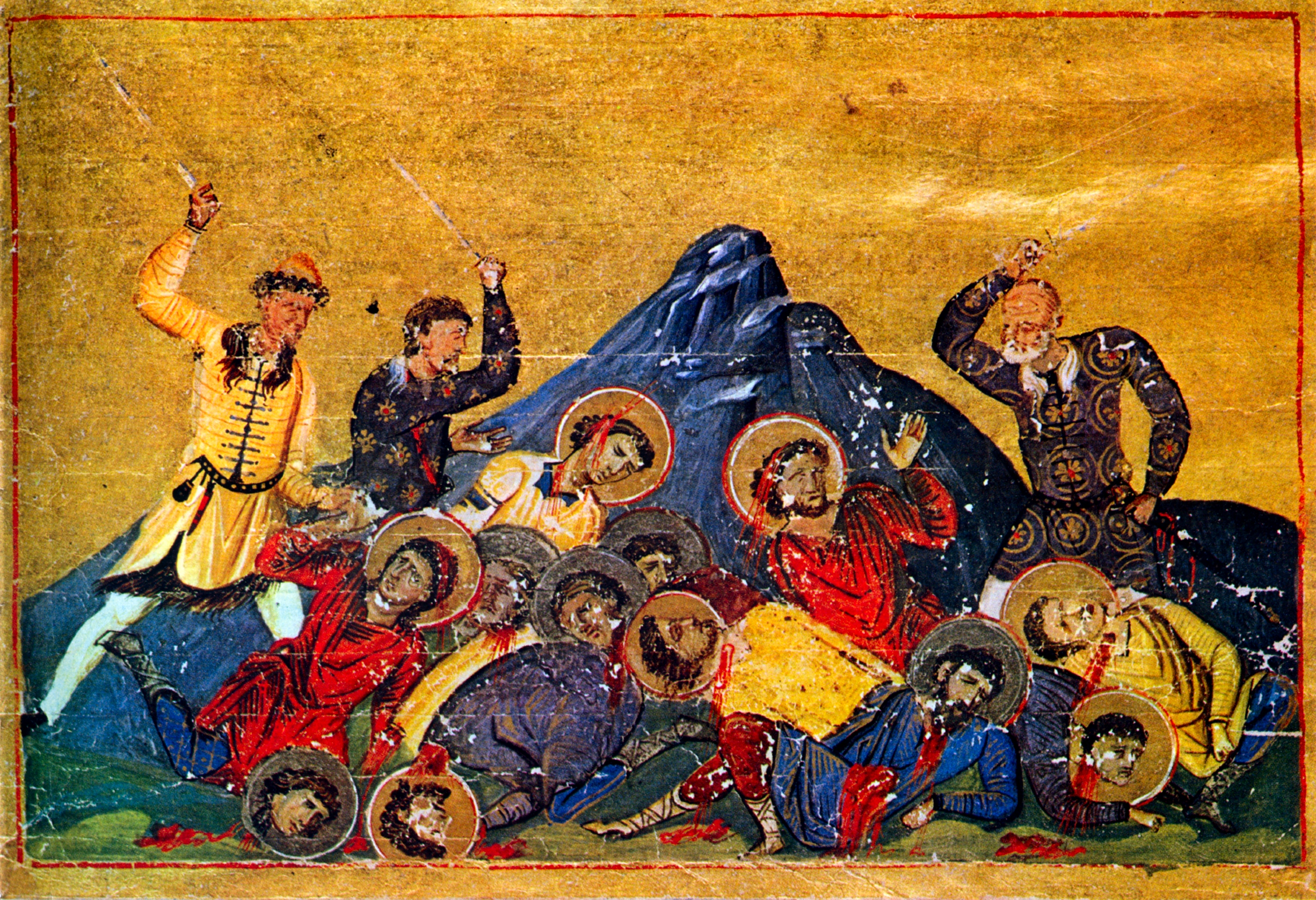
Menologium. Bulgarian pagans killing the Christians (Byzantines)

Khan Krum engaged in an aggressive policy within the Balkans, raiding along the Struma valley in 807, where he defeated a Byzantine army and captured an enormous amount of gold intended as wages for the whole Byzantine army. In 809, Krum besieged and forced the surrender of Serdica (Sofia), slaughtering the Byzantine garrison in spite of his promise of safe conduct. This provoked Byzantine Emperor Nikephoros I to settle Anatolian populations along the frontier to protect it and to attempt to retake and refortify Serdica, although this enterprise ultimately failed.

=== Conflict with Nikephoros I ===
In early 811, Nikephoros I undertook a massive expedition against Bulgaria, advancing to Marcellae (near Karnobat). Here Krum attempted to negotiate on July 11, 811, but Nikephoros was determined to continue his advance. His army managed to avoid Bulgar ambushes in the Balkan Mountains and defeated an army of 12,000 that tried to block their advance into Moesia. Another hastily assembled army of 50,000 was defeated before the walls of the Bulgarian capital, Pliska, which fell to the emperor on July 20. Here Nikephoros, who had been a financial minister before becoming emperor, helped himself to the treasures of Krum, while setting the city ablaze and turning his army on the population. A new diplomatic tentative from Krum was rebuffed. Nikephorus showed great cruelty, ordering his army to kill the population of the capital.

Increasingly concerned about the breakdown of discipline in his army, Nikephoros finally began to retreat towards Thrace. In the meantime, Krum had mobilized as many of his subjects as he could (including the women) and had begun to set traps and ambushes for the retreating imperial army in the mountain passes. At dawn on July 26 the Byzantines found themselves trapped against a moat and wooden wall in the Vărbica pass. Nikephoros was killed in the ensuing battle along with many of his troops, while his son Staurakios was carried to safety by the imperial bodyguard after receiving a paralyzing wound to his neck. According to tradition, Krum had the Emperor's skull lined with silver and used it as a drinking cup. This enhanced his reputation for brutality and won him the nickname "New Sennacherib".

=== Conflict with Michael I Rangabe ===
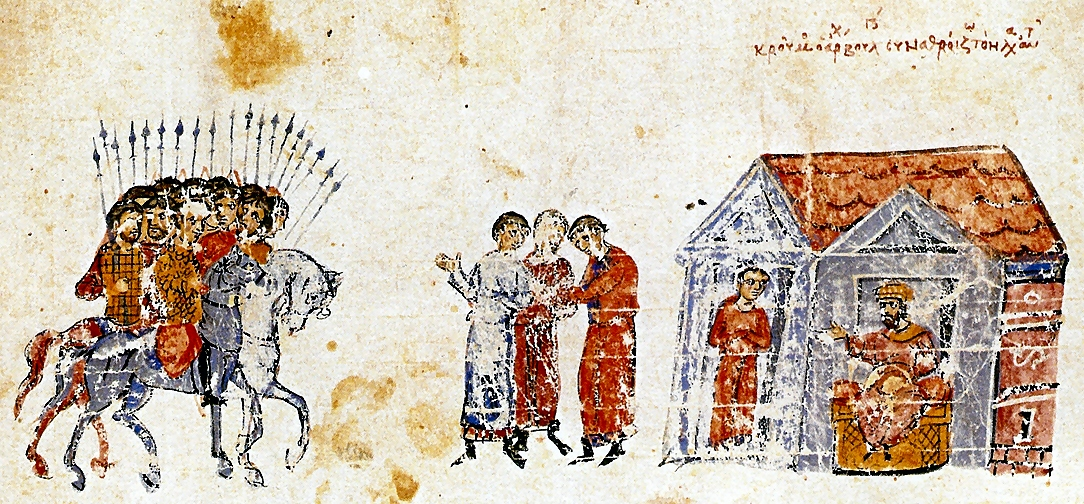
Krum assembles his army to defeat the Byzantines

Staurakios was forced to abdicate after a brief reign (he died from his wound in 812) and was succeeded by his brother-in-law, Michael I Rangabe. In 812 Krum invaded Byzantine Thrace, taking Develt and scaring the population of nearby fortresses to flee towards Constantinople. From this position of strength, Krum offered a return to the peace treaty of 716. Unwilling to compromise his regime by weakness, the new Emperor Michael I refused to accept the proposal, seemingly opposing the clause for exchange of deserters. To apply more pressure on the emperor, Krum besieged and captured Mesembria (Nesebar) in the fall of 812.

In February 813, the Bulgars raided into Thrace but were repelled by the emperor's forces. Encouraged by this success, Michael I summoned troops from the entire empire and headed north, hoping for a decisive victory. Krum led his army south towards Adrianople and pitched camp near Versinikia. Michael I lined up his army against the Bulgars, but neither side initiated an attack for two weeks. Finally, on June 22, 813, the Byzantines attacked but were immediately turned to flight. With Krum's cavalry in pursuit, the rout of Michael I was complete, and Krum advanced on Constantinople, which he besieged by land. Discredited, Michael was forced to abdicate and become a monk—the third Byzantine emperor undone by Krum in as many years.

=== Conflict with Leo V the Armenian ===
The new emperor, Leo V the Armenian, offered to negotiate and arranged for a meeting with Krum. As Krum arrived, he was ambushed by Byzantine archers and was wounded as he made his escape. Furious, Krum ravaged the environs of Constantinople and headed home, capturing Adrianople en route and transplanting its inhabitants (including the parents of the future Emperor Basil I) across the Danube. In spite of the approach of winter, Krum took advantage of good weather to send a force of 30,000 into Thrace, capturing Arkadioupolis (Lüleburgaz) and carrying off some 50,000 captives. The loot from Thrace was used to enrich Krum and his nobility and included architectural elements utilized in the reconstruction of Pliska, perhaps largely by captured Byzantine artisans.

Krum spent the winter preparing for a major attack on Constantinople, where rumor reported the assemblage of an extensive siege park to be transported on 5,000 carts. He died before he set out, however, on April 13, 814, and was succeeded by his son Omurtag.

=== Omurtag's peace treaty ===
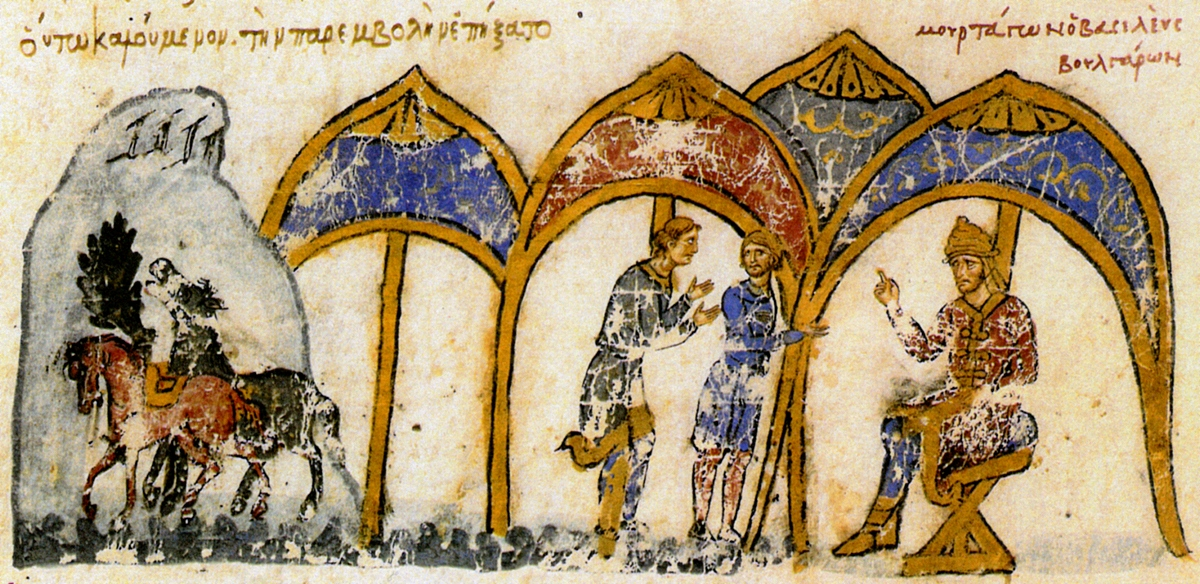
Omurtag sends delegation to the Byzantines

The reign of Khan Omurtag opened with an invasion of the Byzantine Empire after the rejection of Byzantine offers for peace. The Bulgars penetrated as far south as modern Babaeski (Bulgarophygon then), but there they were defeated by Emperor Leo V the Armenian, and Omurtag escaped the battlefield on his swift horse. The battle was not a decisive blow for the Bulgars, though it certainly had some effect. The possibility of an anti-Bulgar alliance between the Byzantine and the Frankish empires, the need to consolidate Bulgar authority in the newly conquered lands, and the new stirring of the tribes in the steppes gave reason for Omurtag to conclude a 30-year peace treaty with the Byzantines in 815, which was partly inscribed on a surviving column found near the village of Seltsi, Shumen Province. According to that inscription the treaty specified the border in Thrace, the issue with those Slavs who remained in Byzantium, and the exchange of the other prisoners of war. The treaty was honoured by both sides and was renewed after the accession of the new Byzantine Emperor Michael II to the throne in 820. In 821 Thomas the Slav rebelled against the Byzantine Emperor and laid siege to Constantinople, seeking to seize the imperial throne for himself. Khan Omurtag sent an army to help Michael II put down the rebellion, attacking the rebels at the Battle of Kedouktos (winter 822 or spring 823). Although Byzantine accounts report that Thomas's army was routed, modern scholars consider the battle a victory, albeit costly, for Thomas.

== Brief war with Theophilos ==
After the expiration of the original 20-year peace treaty with the Byzantine Empire in 836, Emperor Theophilos ravaged the regions within the Bulgarian frontier. The Bulgars retaliated, and under the leadership of Isbul, the minister of Malamir, they reached Adrianople. At this time, if not earlier, the Bulgars captured Philippopolis (Plovdiv) and its environs. Several surviving monumental inscriptions from this reign make reference to the Bulgar victories and others to the continuation of construction activities in and near Pliska. The war ended, however, when Slavs in the vicinity of Thessalonica rebelled against the Byzantine Empire in 837.

Emperor Theophilos sought Bulgar support in putting down the rebellion, but he simultaneously arranged for his fleet to sail through the Danube delta and undertake a clandestine evacuation of some of the Byzantine captives settled in trans-Danubian Bulgaria by Krum and Omurtag. In retaliation Isbul campaigned along the Aegean coasts of Thrace and Macedonia and captured the city of Philippi, where Theophilos set up a surviving memorial inscription in a local church. Isbul's campaign may have resulted in the establishment of Bulgar suzerainty over the Slavic tribe of the Smoljani.

== Wars of Boris I ==
Despite his able diplomacy, statesmanship, and his importance in the process of converting Bulgaria to Christianity, Boris I was not a particularly successful leader in war, being at various times defeated by the Franks, Croats, Serbs, and Byzantines.

=== War of 852 ===
Soon after coming to power Boris launched a brief campaign against the Byzantines in 852. No details of the outcome of this war are extant, though it is possible he may have gained some territory in inland Macedonia.

=== War of 855–856 ===
Another conflict between the Byzantines and Bulgarians started in 855–856. The Empire wanted to regain its control over some areas of inland Thrace and the ports around the Gulf of Burgas on the Black Sea. The Byzantine forces, led by the emperor and the caesar Bardas, were successful in the conflict and reconquered a number of cities, Philippopolis, Develtus, Anchialus and Mesembria being among them, and also the frontier region between Sider and Develtus, known as Zagora, in northeastern Thrace. At the time of this campaign the Bulgarians were distracted by a war with the Franks under Louis the German and the Croatians.

=== Military conflict connected to the Christian conversion of Boris ===
In 863 Boris made a decision to embrace Christianity, and he sought a mission from the Franks. The Byzantines could not countenance so close a neighbor as Bulgaria falling under Frankish religious control. Byzantium had recently gained a major victory over the Arabs and was free to field a considerable military force against Bulgaria. A fleet was sent into the Black Sea and an army dispatched to invade Bulgaria. As the bulk of Boris' army was campaigning against Moravia far to the northwest, he had little choice but to yield immediately. He broke off the Frankish alliance, allowed Greek clergy to enter Bulgaria, and was eventually baptized, with the Byzantine emperor Michael III as his sponsor; Boris took the additional name of Michael at his baptism. The Bulgarians were allowed to recover the debatable region of Zagora as a reward for their change of religious orientation.

== Simeon I the Great's Imperial ambitions ==
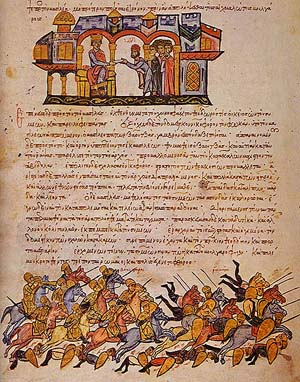
The Bulgarians routing the Byzantine forces at Bulgarophygon in 896

With the ascendance of Simeon I to the throne in 893, the long-lasting peace with the Byzantine Empire established by his father was about to end. A conflict arose when Byzantine Emperor Leo VI the Wise, acting under pressure from his wife Zoe Zaoutzaina and her father, Stylianos Zaoutzes, moved the marketplace for Bulgarian goods from Constantinople to Thessaloniki, where Bulgarian merchants were heavily taxed. Forced to take action, in the autumn of 894 Simeon invaded the Byzantine Empire from the north, meeting little opposition due to the concentration of most Byzantine forces in eastern Anatolia to counter Arab invasions. Informed of the Bulgarian offensive, the surprised Leo sent an army consisting of guardsmen and other military units from the capital to halt Simeon, but his troops were routed somewhere in the theme of Macedonia.The Magyars managed to defeat Simeon's army twice, but in 896 they were routed in the Battle of Southern Buh. The war ended in 896 with a great Bulgarian victory near Bulgarophygon in Eastern Thrace. The market was returned to Constantinople, and the Byzantine Emperor had to pay annual tribute to Bulgaria. More importantly, with help from the Pechenegs Simeon successfully fended off a Magyar invasion, which was coordinated with the Byzantines.

Map of the progress of the Battle of Achelous or Anchialos.

After the death of Leo VI on 11 May 912 and the accession of his infant son Constantine VII, under the guidance of Leo's brother Alexander, who expelled Leo's last wife and Constantine's mother, Zoe Karbonopsina, from the palace, Simeon claimed the imperial title and tried to replace Byzantium as the biggest power in the region, perhaps building a new Bulgarian–Byzantine empire. Alexander died on 6 June 913, leaving the capital in anarchy and the rule of the empire in the hands of a regency council headed by Patriarch Nicholas Mystikos. This gave the Bulgarian ruler a great opportunity to attempt a campaign towards the Byzantine capital, so he attacked in full force in late July or August 913, reaching Constantinople without any serious resistance. The protracted negotiations resulted in the payment of the arrears in the Byzantine tribute, the promise that Constantine VII would marry one of Simeon's daughters, and, most importantly, Simeon's official recognition as Emperor (tzar) of the Bulgarians by Patriarch Nicholas in the Blachernai Palace. Until the end of his reign, Simeon used the style of "Emperor of the Bulgarians and the Romans".

Shortly after Simeon visited Constantinople, Constantine's mother Zoe returned to the palace on the insistence of the young emperor and immediately proceeded to eliminate the regents. Through a plot, she managed to assume power in February 914, practically removing Patriarch Nicholas from the government, disowning and obscuring his recognition of Simeon's imperial title, and rejecting the planned marriage of her son to one of Simeon's daughters. In retaliation, Simeon invaded Thrace in the summer of 914 and captured Adrianople. In 917, a particularly strong Byzantine army led by Leo Phokas, son of Nikephoros Phokas, invaded Bulgaria accompanied by the Byzantine navy under the command of Romanos Lekapenos, which sailed to the Bulgarian Black Sea ports. En route to Mesembria (Nesebǎr), where they were supposed to be reinforced by troops transported by the navy, Phokas' forces stopped to rest near the river of Acheloos, not far from the port of Anchialos (Pomorie). Once informed of the invasion, Simeon rushed to intercept the Byzantines, and he attacked them from the nearby hills while they were resting disorganized. In the Battle of Achelous (or Anchialus) on 20 August 917, one of the largest in medieval history, the Bulgarians completely routed the Byzantines and killed many of their commanders, although Phokas managed to escape to Mesembria. As a result of the victory Simeon drew into his orbit the Pecheneg leaders and started a major offensive against the European dominions of Byzantium. The Bulgarians sent to pursue the remnants of the Byzantine army approached Constantinople and encountered Byzantine forces under Leo Phokas, who had returned to the capital, at the village of Katasyrtai in the immediate proximity of Constantinople.

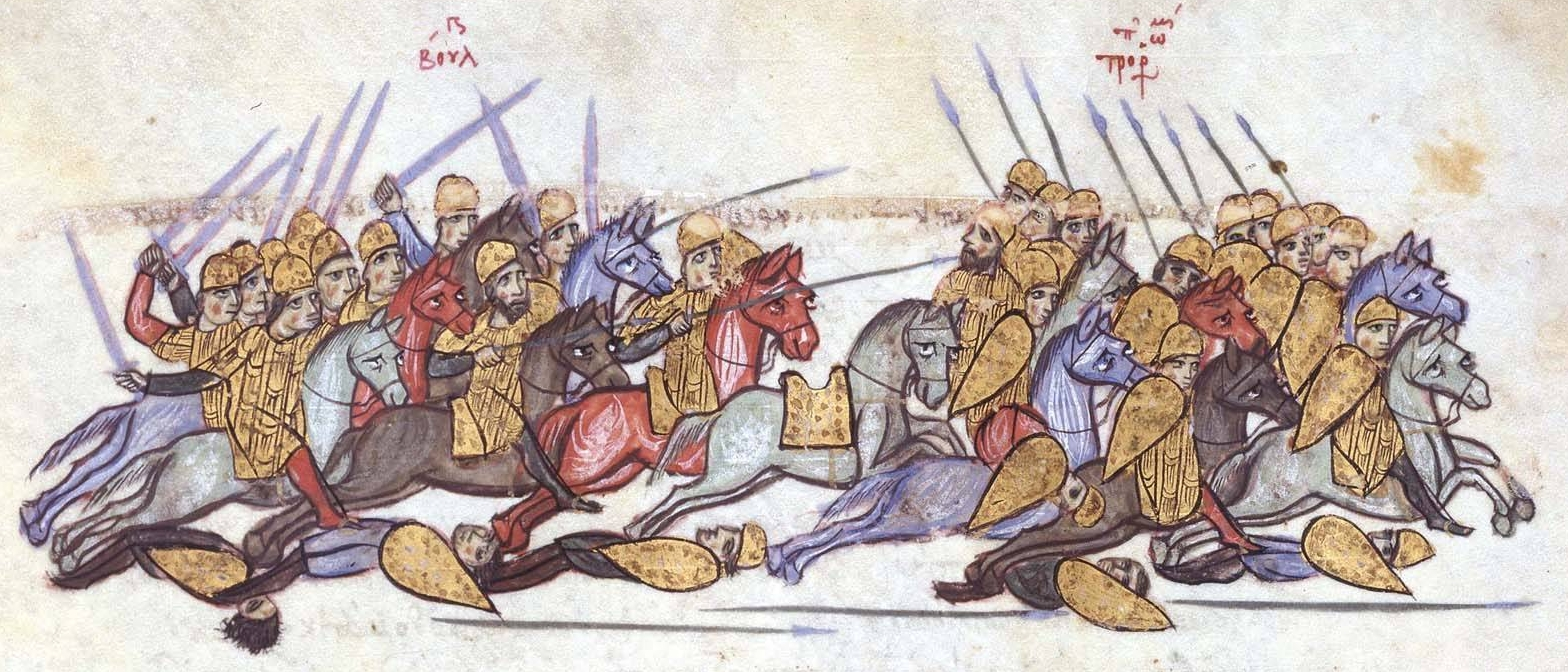
The Bulgarian victory at Anchialos

Simeon pursued an aggressive policy regarding the Medieval Serbian principalities that tended to support Byzantium. Bulgarian troops led by Theodore Sigritsa and Marmais invaded the country, deposing local rulers like Petar Gojniković and Pavle Branović. Meanwhile, the admiral Romanos Lekapenos replaced Zoe as regent of the young Constantine VII in 919 and advanced himself to the rank of co-emperor in December 920, effectively assuming control of the empire. No longer able to climb to the Byzantine throne by diplomatic means, the infuriated Simeon once again had to wage war to impose his will. Between 920 and 922, Bulgaria increased its pressure on Byzantium, campaigning in the west through Thessaly, reaching the Isthmus of Corinth, and in the east in Thrace, reaching and crossing the Dardanelles to lay siege on the town of Lampsacus. Simeon's forces appeared before Constantinople in 921, when they demanded the deposition of Romanos and captured Adrianople; in 922 they were victorious at Pigae, burning much of the Golden Horn and seizing Bizye.

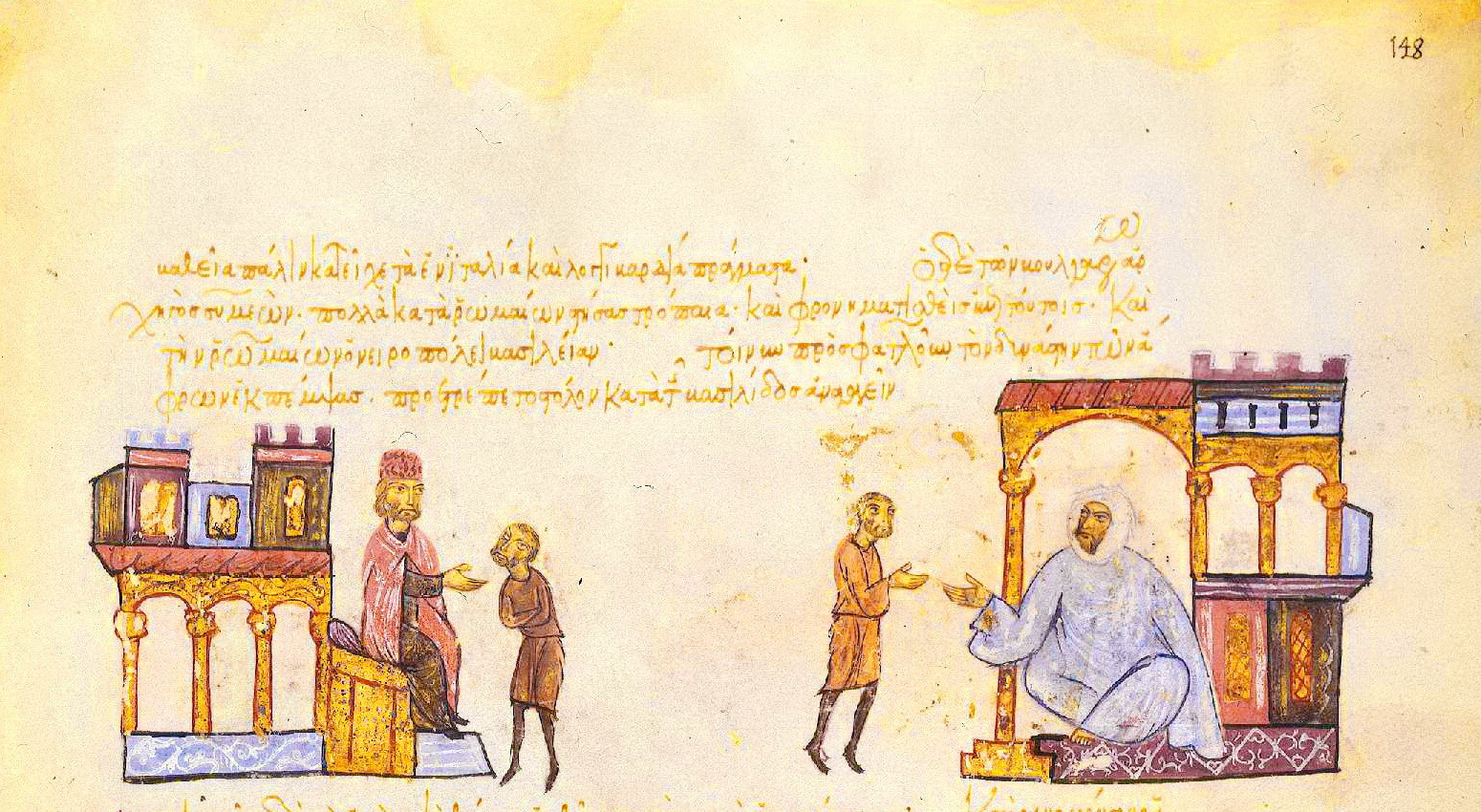
Simeon sending envoys to the Fatimid ruler Ubayd Allah. Madrid Skylitzes.

Desperate to conquer Constantinople, Simeon planned a large campaign in 924 and sent envoys to the Shia Fatimid ruler Ubayd Allah al-Mahdi Billah, who possessed a powerful navy, which Simeon needed. The Ubayd Allah agreed and sent his own representatives back with the Bulgarians to arrange the alliance. However, the envoys were captured by the Byzantines at Calabria. Romanos offered peace to Egypt under the Fatimids, supplementing this offer with generous gifts, and ruined the Fatimids newly formed alliance with Bulgaria.

In 924 Simeon sent an army led by Časlav Klonimirović to depose a former ally of his, Zaharije Pribisavljević. He was successful, as Zaharije fled to Croatia. In the summer of the same year, Simeon arrived at Constantinople and demanded to see the patriarch and the emperor. He conversed with Romanos on the Golden Horn on 9 September 924 and arranged a truce, according to which Byzantium would pay Bulgaria an annual tax, but would be ceded back some cities on the Black Sea coast. In 926, Simeon's troops invaded Croatia, at the time a Byzantine ally, but were severely defeated by the army of King Tomislav in the Battle of the Bosnian Highlands. A peace was mediated by the papal legate Madalbert between Simeon and Tomislav. Though the army he sent to Croatia was destroyed, Simeon retained sufficient military forces to contemplate renewed aggression against the Byzantines.

After 14 years of war Simeon was ultimately too frustrated in his designs on the Byzantine throne. In the year following the destruction of his army in Croatia, while planning another attack on the Byzantines, he died of a heart attack in his palace in Preslav on May 27, 927.

== Peter's relations with the Byzantines ==
Soon after his accession, Simeon's son Peter I renewed the war and raided Byzantine Thrace. Following this show of strength, Peter dispatched a diplomatic mission to Constantinople seeking peace. A peace was obtained with the frontiers restored to those defined in treaties of 897 and 904. Simeon's conquests in Thrace were restored to the Byzantine Empire, which in return recognised Bulgarian control over inland Macedonia. Peter also gained a Byzantine bride, Maria Lecapena, granddaughter of Romanus I, an annual tribute, and recognition of his title of tsar and of the autocephalus status of the Bulgarian church. This peace lasted until 966. After Peter's empress died in the mid 960s, the Byzantine emperor Nikephoros II Phokas refused to pay the annual tribute to Bulgaria in 966, complaining of the Bulgarian alliance with the Magyars, and undertook a show of force at the Bulgarian border. Dissuaded from a direct attack against Bulgaria, Nikephoros II dispatched a messenger to the Kievan prince Sviatoslav Igorevich to arrange a Kievan attack against Bulgaria from the north. Sviatoslav readily launched a campaign with a vast force and routed the Bulgarians on the Danube, seizing some 80 Bulgarian fortresses in 968. Stunned by the success of his ally and suspicious of his actual intentions, Emperor Nikephoros II now hastened to make peace with Bulgaria and arranged the marriage of his wards, the underage emperors Basil II and Constantine VIII, to two Bulgarian princesses. Two of Peter's sons were sent to Constantinople as both negotiators and honorary hostages. In the meantime, Peter managed to secure the retreat of the Kievan forces by inciting Bulgaria's traditional allies, the Pechenegs, to attack Kiev itself.

== Sviatoslav's invasion and the Byzantine conquest of Bulgaria ==
=== Campaigns of Sviatoslav and John Tzimiskes in Bulgaria ===
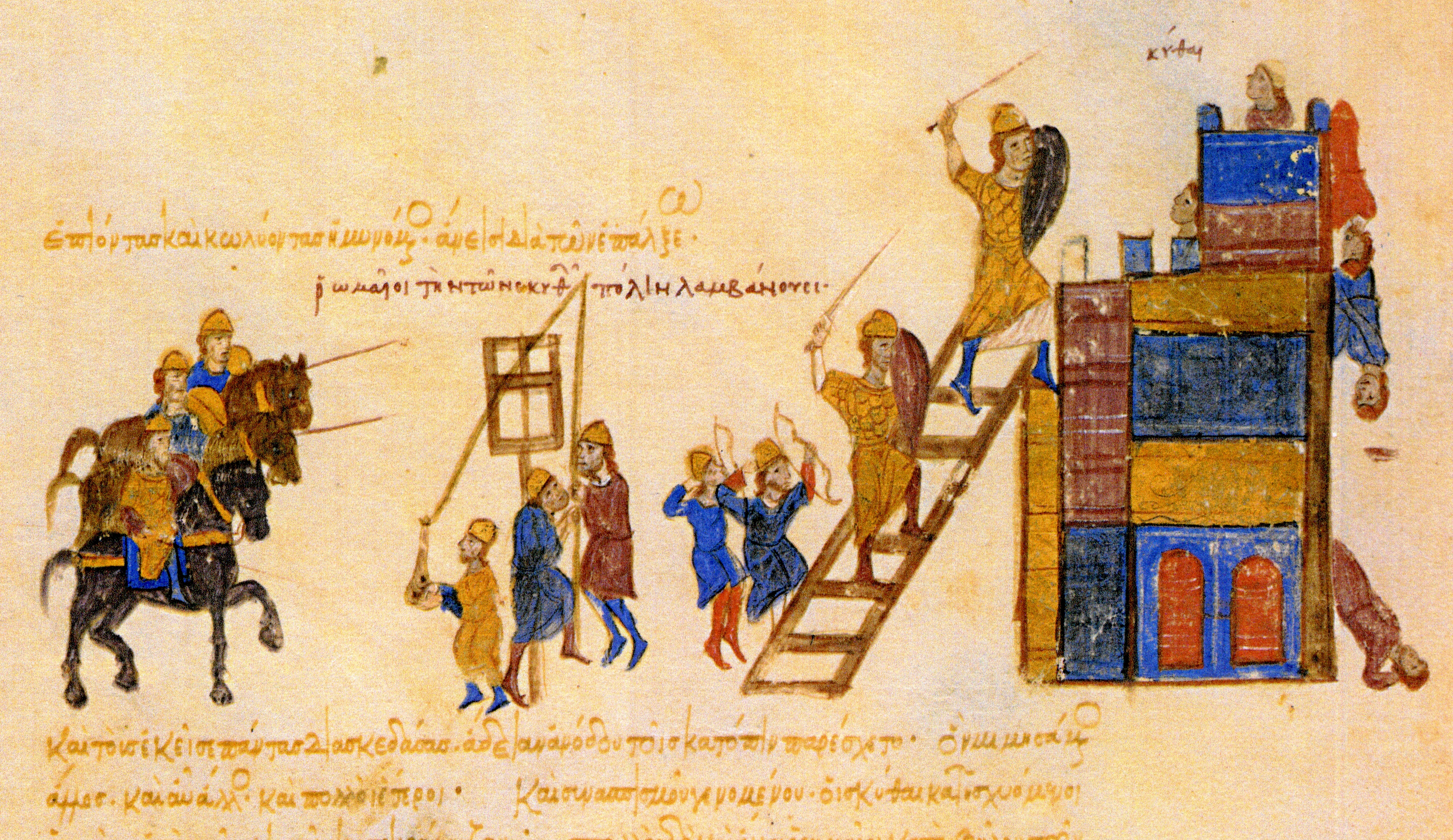
The Byzantines sack the Bulgarian capital Preslav

In 968 Boris II, future emperor of Bulgaria, went to Constantinople again to negotiate a peace settlement with Emperor Nikephoros II Phokas, and apparently to serve as an honorary hostage. This arrangement was intended to put an end to the conflict between Bulgaria and Byzantium, which would now join forces against Prince Sviatoslav I of Kiev, whom the Byzantine emperor had pitted against the Bulgarians. In 969 a new Kievan invasion defeated the Bulgarians again, and Peter I abdicated to become a monk. In circumstances that are not entirely clear, Boris II was allowed to return to Bulgaria and sit on his father's throne.

Boris II was unable to stem the Kievan advance and found himself forced to accept Sviatoslav of Kiev as his ally and puppet-master, turning against the Byzantines. A Kievan campaign into Byzantine Thrace was defeated at Arcadiopolis in 970, and the new Byzantine Emperor John I Tzimiskes advanced northwards. Failing to secure the defense of the Balkan passes, Sviatoslav allowed the Byzantines to penetrate into Moesia and lay siege to the Bulgarian capital Preslav. Although Bulgarians and Russians joined in defending the city, the Byzantines managed to set afire the wooden structures and roofs with missiles, and they took the fortress. Boris II now became a captive of John I Tzimiskes, who continued to pursue the Russians, besieging Sviatoslav in Drăstăr (Silistra) while claiming to act as Boris' ally and protector and treating the Bulgarian monarch with due respect. After Sviatoslav had come to terms and set out for Kiev, the Byzantine emperor returned to Constantinople in triumph. Far from liberating Bulgaria as he had claimed, John brought along Boris II and his family, together with the contents of the Bulgarian imperial treasury in 971. In a public ceremony in Constantinople, Boris II was ritually divested of his imperial insignia and was given the Byzantine court title of magistros as compensation. The Bulgarian lands in Thrace and lower Moesia now became part of the Byzantine Empire and were placed under Byzantine governors.

=== Tsar Samuel and the conquest of Bulgaria by Basil II ===
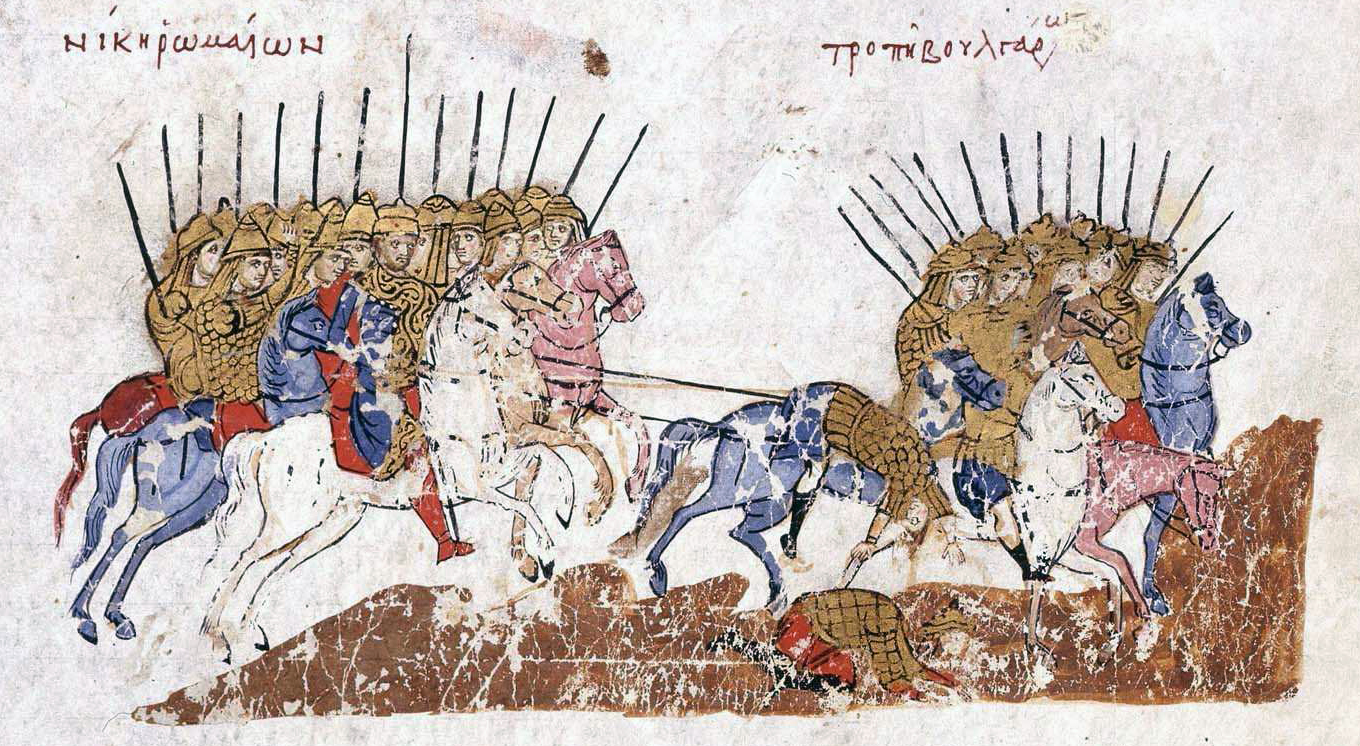
The victory of the Byzantines over the Bulgarians, from the 12th century Madrid Skylitzes.

Although the ceremony in 971 had been intended as a symbolic termination of the Bulgarian empire, the Byzantines were unable to assert their control over the western provinces of Bulgaria. These remained under the rule of their own governors, especially a noble family led by four brothers called the Cometopuli (i.e., "the sons of the Count"), named David, Moses, Aron, and Samuel. The movement was regarded as a "revolt" by the Byzantine emperor, but it apparently saw itself as a sort of regency for the captive Boris II. As they began to raid neighboring territories under Byzantine rule, the Byzantine government resorted to a stratagem intended to compromise the leadership of this "revolt". This involved allowing Boris II and his brother Roman to escape from their honorary captivity at the Byzantine court, in the hope that their arrival in Bulgaria would cause a division between the Cometopuli and other Bulgarian leaders. As the brothers entered the region under Bulgarian control in 977, Boris II dismounted and went ahead of his brother. Mistaken for a Byzantine noble due to his attire, Boris was shot in the chest by a deaf and mute border patrol. Roman managed to identify himself to the other guards and was duly accepted as emperor. However, since he was a eunuch, as the Byzantines had castrated him so that he could not have any heirs, he was unable to assume the throne. Instead, the youngest of the Cometopuli brothers, Samuel, resisted the Byzantines.

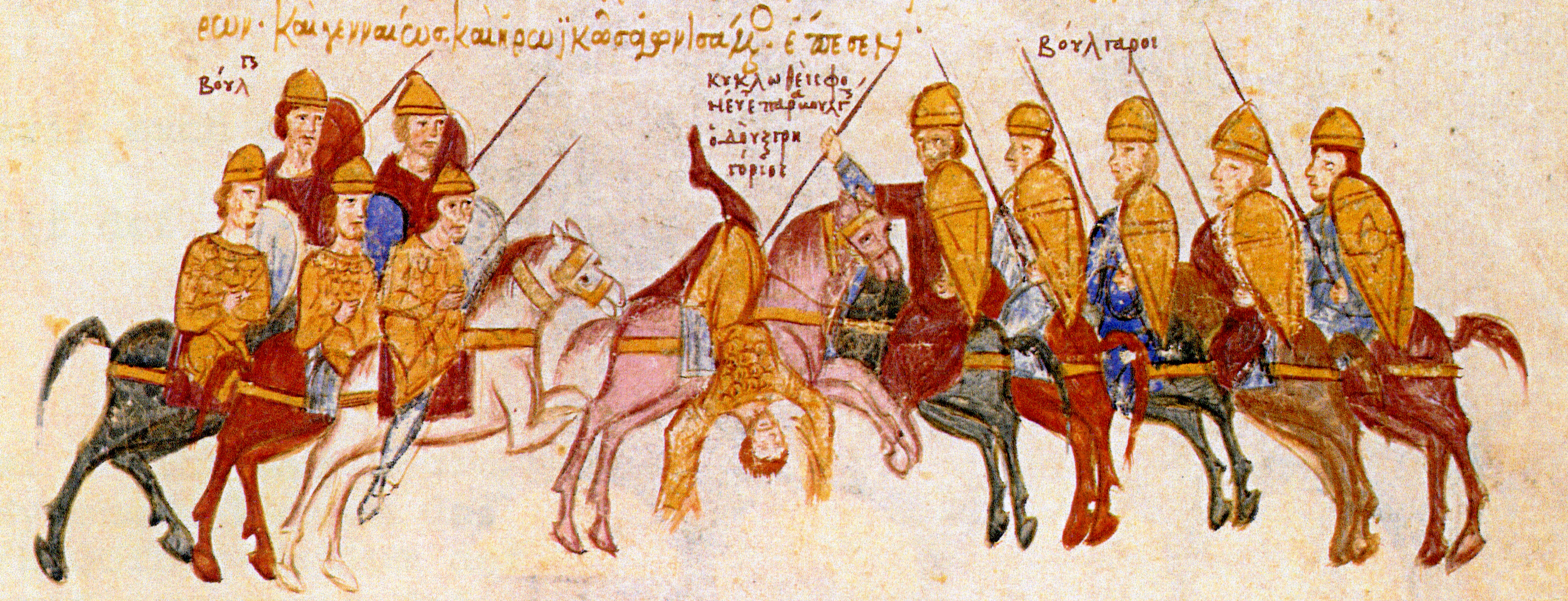
Bulgarian army conquering Edessa and killing its governor

Although the Byzantines eventually managed to capture all of Bulgaria, Samuel resisted Basil II for decades and is the only man to ever defeat him in battle, when in 986 Samuel drove Basil II's army from the field at the Gates of Trajan, and the emperor (barely surviving the heavy defeat) soon turned to the east for new conquests. The victory by Samuel prompted Pope Gregory V to recognize him as Tsar, and he was crowned in Rome in 997. In 1002, a full-scale war broke out. By this time, Basil's army was stronger, and the emperor was determined to conquer Bulgaria once and for all. He deployed much of the imperial army, battle-seasoned from the Eastern campaigns against the Arabs, and Samuel was forced to retreat into his country's heartland. Still, by harassing the powerful Byzantine army, Samuel hoped to force Basil to the peace table. For a dozen years, his tactics maintained Bulgarian independence and even kept Basil away from the main Bulgarian cities, including the capital of Ohrid.

On July 29, 1014, however, at Kleidion (or Belasitsa) (present day Blagoevgrad Province), Basil II was able to corner the main Bulgarian army and force a battle while Samuel was away. He won a crushing victory and, according to later legend, he blinded 14,000 prisoners, leaving one man in every hundred with sight in one eye to lead his comrades home. According to the legend, the sight of this atrocity was too much even for Samuel, who blamed himself for the defeat and died less than three months later, on October 6. This story is a later invention, which gave rise to the nickname by which Basil II was known from the 12th century onwards: the 'Bulgar-slayer'.

=== Ivan Vladislav ===
The Bulgarian Emperor Ivan Vladislav restored the fortifications of Bitola in 1015 and survived an assassination plot undertaken by Byzantine agents. Although the Byzantines sacked Ohrid, they failed to take Pernik and received troubling intelligence that Ivan Vladislav was attempting to induce the Pechenegs to come to his aid, following up the general practice of his predecessors.

While Byzantine armies had penetrated deep into Bulgaria in 1016, Ivan Vladislav was able to rally his forces and commenced a siege of Dyrrachium (Durazzo) in the winter of 1018. During a battle in front of the city, Ivan Vladislav was killed. After his death much of the Bulgarian nobility and court, including his widow Maria and his sons, submitted to the advancing Basil II in exchange for guarantees of the preservation of their lives, status, and property.

== Peter II ==
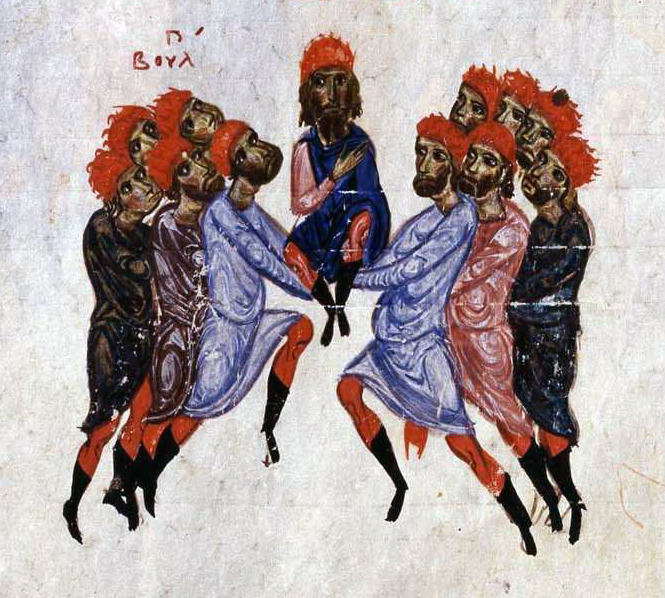
The Bulgarians proclaim Peter Delyan emperor

The newly proclaimed Bulgarian emperor Peter II later led a large revolt against the Byzantines. Peter II Delyan took Niš and Skopje, first co-opting and then eliminating another potential leader in the person of one Tihomir, who had led a rebellion in the region of Durazzo. After this Peter II marched on Thessalonica, where the Byzantine Emperor Michael IV was staying. Michael fled, leaving his treasury to a certain Michael Ivac, probably a son of Ivac, a general under Samuel of Bulgaria, who promptly turned over the bulk of the treasury to Peter outside the city. Thessalonica remained in Byzantine hands, but Macedonia, Durazzo, and parts of northern Greece were taken by Peter II's forces. This inspired further Slavic revolts against Byzantine rule in Epirus and Albania.

Peter II Delyan's successes ended, however, with the interference of his cousin Alusian, whose father, Ivan Vladislav, had murdered Peter's father, Gavril Radomir, in 1015. Alusian joined Peter II's ranks as an apparent deserter from the Byzantine court, where he had been disgraced, and was welcomed by Peter II, who gave him an army to attack Thessalonica. The siege was raised by the Byzantines, however, and the army was defeated. Alusian barely escaped and returned to Ostrovo.

One night in 1041, during dinner, Alusian took advantage of Peter II's inebriation and cut off his nose and blinded him with a kitchen knife. Since Alusian was of the blood of Samuel, he was quickly proclaimed emperor in place of Peter II by his troops, but he conspired to defect to the Byzantines. As the Bulgarian and Byzantine troops were preparing for battle, Alusian deserted to the enemy and headed for Constantinople, where his possessions and lands were restored to him, and he was rewarded with the high courtly rank of magistros.

Meanwhile, though blind, Peter II Delyan resumed command of the Bulgarian forces, but the Byzantine Emperor Michael IV determined to take advantage of the situation and advanced against them. In an obscure battle near Ostrovo, the Byzantines defeated the Bulgarian troops, and Peter II Delyan was captured and taken to Constantinople, where he was perhaps executed. Norse sagas refer to the participation of the future Norwegian King Harald Hardråda, who allegedly cut down Peter II in the field of battle as a member of the Varangian Guard. This tradition may be supported by a laconic reference in the so-called "Bulgarian Apocryphal Chronicle". In either case, Peter II Delyan may have perished in 1041.

== Peter III ==
The troops of the newly crowned Peter III took Niš and Ohrid but suffered a crippling defeat in front of Kastoria. The Byzantine counter-attack took Skopje with the help of Georgi Voiteh, who first betrayed Peter III and then attempted to betray the Byzantines, but in vain. In another battle Peter III was taken captive by the Byzantines and sent, together with Georgi Voiteh, as prisoners to Constantinople. Voiteh died en route, while the former Peter III languished in prison first at Constantinople and then at Antioch.

== Theodore and the Second Bulgarian Empire ==
In 1185 Theodore (Peter IV) and his younger brother Ivan Asen appeared before the Byzantine emperor Isaac II Angelos at Kypsela to request a pronoia, but their request was dismissively refused and Ivan Asen was slapped in the ensuing argument. The insulted brothers returned home to Moesia and, taking advantage of discontent caused by the heavy taxation imposed by the Byzantine emperor to finance his campaigns against William II of Sicily and to celebrate his marriage to Margaret of Hungary, raised a revolt against Byzantine rule.

The rebellion failed to immediately capture Bulgaria's historic capital Preslav, but established a new capital city at Tărnovo, presumably the center of the revolt. In 1186 the rebels suffered a defeat, but Isaac II Angelos failed to exploit his victory and returned to Constantinople. With the help of the chiefly Cuman population north of the Danube, Peter IV and Ivan Asen recovered their positions and raided into Thrace. When Isaac II Angelos penetrated into Moesia again in 1187 he failed to capture either Tărnovo or Loveč, and he signed a treaty effectively recognizing the Second Bulgarian Empire, but neither side had any intention of keeping the peace. When the Third Crusade led by Frederick I, the Holy Roman Emperor, was advancing towards Constantinople, representatives of Peter IV and Ivan Asen approached him with offers of military assistance against the latently hostile Isaac II Angelos at Niš and again at Adrianople.

== Isaac II Angelos' failed retaliations ==
After the passing of the Third Crusade, Isaac II Angelos decided to deal with the Bulgarians decisively. The expedition was planned on a grand scale and reached Tărnovo before besieging it for a protracted period. By this time Peter IV had crowned Ivan Asen I as co-emperor in 1189 and, without abdicating, retired to Preslav. In charge of the defense of the Tărnovo, Ivan Asen I incited the Byzantine emperor to a hasty retreat by spreading rumors about the arrival of a great Cuman army to the relief of the besieged city. The retreating Byzantine army was ambushed by Ivan Asen I in the Balkan passes and Isaac II barely escaped with his life in 1190.

Success now definitely swung in favor of the Bulgarians, who captured the areas of Sredec (Sofia) and Niš in 1191, of Belgrade in 1195, of Melnik and Prosek in 1196, while raiding parties reached as far south as Serres. When the Bulgarian emperor Ivan Asen I was murdered, his successor Kaloyan continued an aggressive policy against the Byzantine Empire by making an alliance with Ivanko, the murderer of Ivan Asen I, who had entered Byzantine service in 1196 and had become governor of Philippopolis (Plovdiv). Another ally of Kaloyan was Dobromir Hriz (Chrysos), who governed the area of Strumica. The coalition was quickly dissolved, as the Byzantines overcame both Ivanko and Dobromir Hriz. Nevertheless, Kaloyan conquered Konstanteia (Simeonovgrad) in Thrace and Varna from the Byzantine Empire in 1201, and most of Slavic Macedonia in 1202.

== Rise of the Latin Empire ==
The war between the Bulgarians and the Byzantines was stalled in 1204, when Catholic forces of the Fourth Crusade captured and sacked Constantinople and created the Latin Empire, electing as emperor Baldwin I of Flanders. Although Kaloyan had offered the crusaders an alliance against the Byzantine Empire, his offer had been spurned, and the Latin Empire expressed the intention of conquering all the lands of the former Byzantine Empire, including the territories ruled by Kaloyan. The impending conflict was precipitated by the Byzantine aristocracy in Thrace, which rebelled against Latin rule in 1205 and called on Kaloyan for help, offering him its submission.

== Latin Wars ==
Although during the period of time from 1204 to 1261 the Bulgarians and the Byzantines mainly fought the Latins, both still held resentment towards each other. In spite of the initially welcome successes of the Bulgarians against the Latins, the Byzantine aristocracy now began to rebel or conspire against its rule. Kaloyan also changed course and turned mercilessly on his former allies, adopting the sobriquet Rōmaioktonos ("slayer of Romans"), as a counter-derivative from Basil II's Boulgaroktonos ("slayer of Bulgarians"). Tsar Ivan Asen II (reign 1218 to 1241) tried to achieve the regency for the 11-year-old Latin Emperor, Baldwin II, after 1228, but the Latin aristocrats did not support Ivan Asen. He inflicted a crushing defeat on Theodore Komnenos Doukas of the Empire of Thessalonica, in the Battle of Klokotnitsa in 1230. Theodore's empire soon collapsed and Ivan Asen conquered large territories in Macedonia, Thessaly and Thrace. But generally the relations between the Bulgarians and Nicaea, the main Byzantine successor state, remained strong, as the new pro-Nicaean alignment of Bulgaria culminated with the marriage between Tsar Ivan Asen II's daughter Elena and the future Theodore II Laskaris, the son of Emperor John III Doukas Vatatzes of Nicaea. The dynastic union was celebrated in 1235 and coincided with the restoration of the Bulgarian patriarchate with the consent of the eastern patriarchs and with a siege of Constantinople by the combined forces of John III and Ivan Asen II. Later on, the Bulgarians decided to aid neither the Latin Empire nor the Nicaeans because both were too involved fighting each other to attack Bulgaria. During 1240s and 1250s the Emperors John III Doukas Vatatzes and his son Theodore II Laskaris led successful campaigns against the Tsardom.

== Bulgarian civil wars ==
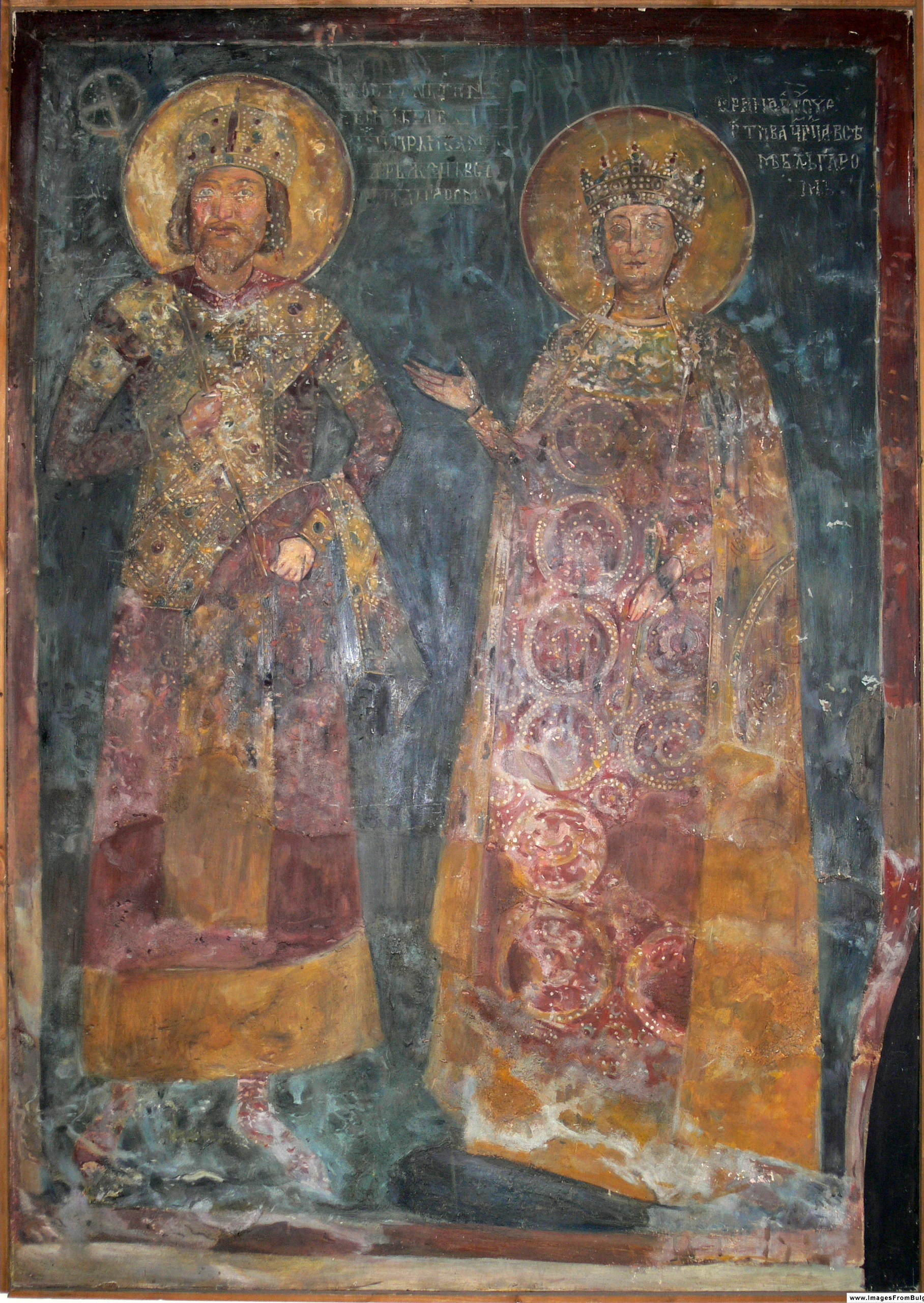
Constantine Tikh, emperor of Bulgaria (1257–1277)

Soon after the Byzantine empire was restored under Michael VIII Palaiologos, he became involved in a civil war in Bulgaria. Michael gave his support for Ivan Asen and sent several Byzantine armies to assert him on the throne. Ivailo, the current Bulgarian ruler, defeated several of these attempts, but he was blockaded for three months in Drăstăr (Silistra) by the Mongol allies of the Byzantine emperor. In the meantime, a Byzantine force besieged the Bulgarian capital and, after hearing a rumor of Ivailo's death in battle, the local nobility surrendered and accepted Ivan Asen III as emperor in 1279.

Shortly after this, still in 1279, Ivailo suddenly appeared before Tărnovo with an army, but he failed to take the well-fortified city. He nevertheless defeated a larger Byzantine relief force near Varna and another in the Balkan passes. Desperate for relief, Ivan Asen III fled Tărnovo in 1280, and his brother-in-law, George Terter I, seized the throne, uniting the factious aristocracy and gradually taking away the support for Ivailo.

== Theodore Svetoslav's Byzantine war ==
During the 13th century the Byzantine and Bulgarian empires were beginning to fade, and they often allied with each other to ward off powerful foes, such as the Golden Horde and the Turks. In 1301, however, the new, aggressive Bulgarian emperor Theodore Svetoslav had several bloody encounters with the Byzantines. He first defeated the former emperor Michael Asen II, who unsuccessfully tried to advance into Bulgaria with a Byzantine army in about 1302. As a consequence of his success, Theodore felt secure enough to take the offensive by 1303 and captured several fortresses in northeastern Thrace, including Mesembria (Nesebăr), Ankhialos (Pomorie), Sozopolis (Sozopol), and Agathopolis (Ahtopol) in the following year. The Byzantine counter-attack failed at the battle on the river Skafida near Sozopolis, where the co-emperor Michael IX Palaiologos was turned to flight. Nevertheless, the war continued, with Michael IX and Theodore Svetoslav taking turns pillaging each other's lands. In 1305 Theodore's uncle Aldimir seems to have entered into some sort of agreement with the Byzantines, and Theodore Svetoslav annexed his lands. In 1306 Svetoslav gained the services of the rebellious Alans, who had previously worked as mercenaries for the Byzantines, settling them in Bulgaria, and he made unsuccessful overtures to the mercenaries of the Catalan Company, who had also rebelled against their Byzantine employers. The war ended with a peace treaty in 1307, cemented with a marriage between the widowed Theodore Svetoslav and Theodora Palaiologina, a daughter of Michael IX.

== George Terter II's Byzantine war ==
George Terter II became the Bulgarian ruler after his father died in 1322, and he became actively involved in the civil war in the Byzantine Empire, where the throne was being contested by Andronikos II Palaiologos and his grandson Andronikos III Palaiologos. Taking advantage of the situation, George invaded Byzantine Thrace and, encountering little, if any, resistance, conquered the major city of Philippopolis (Plovdiv) and part of the surrounding area in 1322 or 1323. A Bulgarian garrison was installed under the command of a general named Ivan the Russian, while a court scribe praised George Terter II as a "possessor of the Bulgarian and the Greek sceptre". A new campaign later the same year conquered several fortresses around Adrianople, but the Bulgarians were finally defeated by Andronikos III. The Byzantine emperor was preparing for an invasion of Bulgaria, when he heard the news that George Terter II had died, apparently of natural causes.

== Michael Asen III's wars ==
The death of George Terter II was followed by a brief period of confusion and uncertainty, which was exploited by the Byzantine Emperor Andronikos III Palaiologos. The Byzantines overran northeastern Thrace and captured a number of important cities. At the same time, a Byzantine-sponsored pretender, Vojsil, brother of the former Bulgarian emperor Smilec, ensconced himself in Krăn, assuming control of the valley between the Balkan mountains and Sredna Gora. At this point the newly elected Bulgarian emperor Michael Asen III marched south to fight Andronikos III, while another Byzantine army was besieging Philippopolis (Plovdiv).

Although Michael Asen III managed to force Andronikos III to retreat, the Byzantines managed to capture Philippopolis while the Bulgarians were changing garrisons. In spite of this loss, Michael Asen III expelled Vojsil and recovered control over northern and northeastern Thrace in 1324. The status quo was confirmed by a peace treaty with the Byzantine Empire, which was cemented by Michael Asen III's marriage to Theodora Palaiologina, the sister of Andronikos III Palaiologos, who had been previously married to Theodore Svetoslav of Bulgaria.

=== Byzantine civil war ===
In 1327 Michael Asen III involved himself in the renewed civil war in the Byzantine Empire, taking the side of his brother-in-law Andronikos III, while his grandfather and rival, Andronikos II, obtained the support of the Serbian king Stephen Dečanski. Andronikos III and Michael Asen III met and concluded an aggressive alliance against Serbia.

Nevertheless, Michael Asen III entered into negotiations with Andronikos II, offering military support in exchange for money and border lands. Marching to the frontier with his army, Michael Asen III sent a detachment to ostensibly help Andronikos II, but which actually intended to capture the Emperor. Forewarned by his grandson, Andronikos II prudently kept the Bulgarian detachment away from the capital and his person. Giving up on his ploy, Michael Asen III attempted to gain the lands by force but retreated before the advance of Andronikos III. Another showdown in front of Adrianople in 1328 ended without battle and with the renewal of the peace treaty, after which Michael Asen III returned to his country, but not before securing a large payoff.

== Ivan Alexander's defence of Bulgaria ==
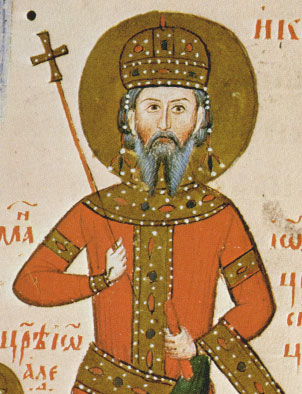
Ivan Alexander

In the early 1340s, relations with the Byzantine Empire temporarily deteriorated. Ivan Alexander demanded the extradition of his cousin Shishman (Šišman), one of the sons of Michael Asen III, threatening the Byzantine government with war. His show of force backfired, however, as the Byzantines called his bluff and sent against him the fleet of their ally, the Turkish emir of Smyrna, Umur Beg. Landing in the Danube Delta, the Turks pillaged the countryside and attacked the Bulgarian cities in the vicinity. Restrained by his own demands, Ivan Alexander invaded the Byzantine Empire again at the end of 1341, claiming that he had been summoned by the people of Adrianople. There his troops were defeated twice by Turkish allies of the Byzantines.

In 1341–1347, the Byzantine Empire was plunged into a second protracted civil war, between the regency for Emperor John V Palaiologos and his intended guardian John VI Kantakouzenos. The neighbors of the Byzantines took advantage of the civil war, and while Stefan Dušan sided with John VI Kantakouzenos, Ivan Alexander backed John V Palaiologos and his regency. Although the two Balkan rulers picked opposite sides in the Byzantine civil war, they maintained their alliance with each other. As the price for Ivan Alexander's support, the regency for John V Palaiologos ceded him the city of Philippopolis (Plovdiv) and nine important fortresses in the Rhodope Mountains in 1344.

Another Byzantine civil war erupted in Thrace in 1352 between Matthew Cantacuzenus and John V, who was reaching his majority and becoming restless at being excluded from power by his father-in-law, John VI Cantacuzenus. In an attempt to pacify him, and also to remove him from the capital, the emperor assigned him in late 1351 or 1352 an appanage in the western part of Byzantine Thrace and in the Rhodopes. His son, Matthew, who ruled the territory, was removed and received a new one, located to the east and centered in Adrianople. The two princes were soon quarreling over boundaries, and Matthew refused to recognize John V as heir to the throne. Soon war broke out between them. After hiring a large number of Turkish mercenaries and with the promise of support from the Thessalonians (long-time enemies of Cantacuzenus), John marched against Matthews' appanage. One after another, Matthew's towns, including Adrianople, quickly surrendered to the young Palaeologian emperor. Expecting serious retaliation John V sought and was promised help from both Serbia and Bulgaria. Meanwhile, after hiring more Ottoman Turks, the Emperor John Cantacuzenus then retook all the cities that had surrendered to John V, who retreated west seeking Serbian help. Stefan Dušan obliged by sending him four thousand horsemen. However, Orhan, the Ottoman bey, provided Cantacuzenus with ten thousand. The Ottoman cavalry met the Serbs and possibly a Bulgarian force—since after the battle, Turkish forces plundered Bulgaria—in an open field battle near Demotika in October 1352. The more numerous Ottomans crushed the Serbs and Bulgars in the first major battle in Europe between Ottomans and Europeans.

== Fall of Bulgaria and Byzantium ==
In 1396 Bulgaria fell to the Ottoman Turks, and in 1453 Constantinople was captured. Since both became part of the Ottoman Empire, this was the end of the long series of Bulgarian-Byzantine Wars.

== See also ==
- Byzantine army
- Medieval Bulgarian army
