= Battle of Thessalonica (1040) =

Coordinates: 40°39′N 22°54′E

- Part of the Byzantine–Bulgarian wars
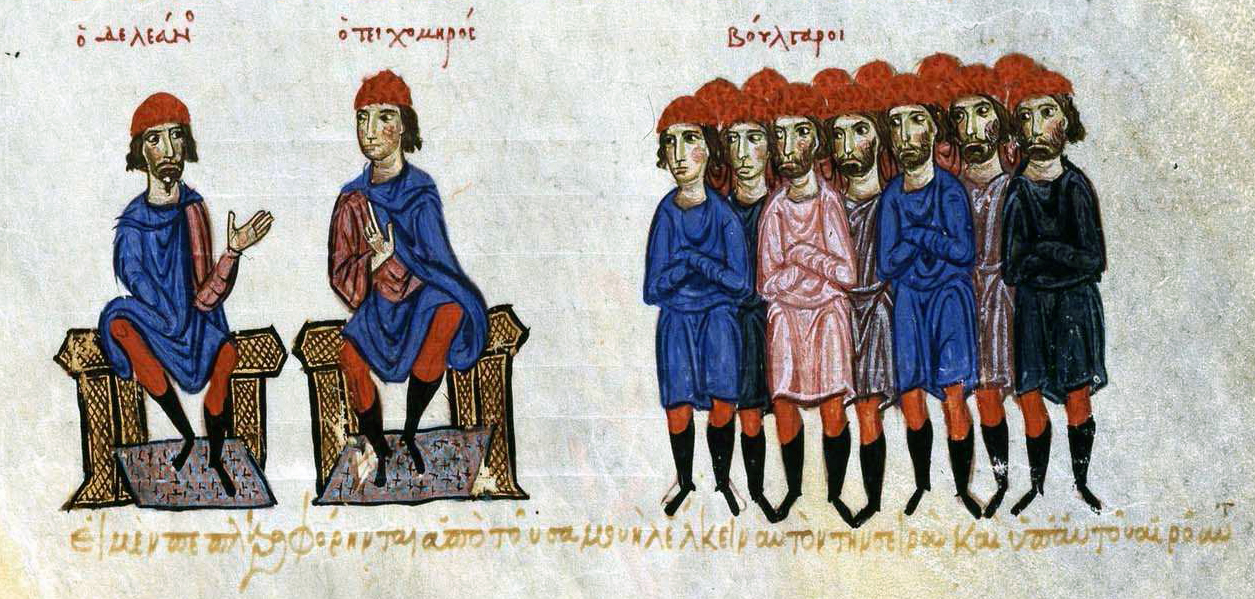
- Deljan and Tihomir
Date	1040
Location	near Thessaloniki, Greece
Result	Bulgarian victory

Belligerents
Bulgarian Empire	Byzantine Empire

Commanders and leaders
Peter Delyan	Michael IV the Paphlagonian

Strength
Unknown	Unknown

Casualties and losses
Unknown	Unknown

The battle of Thessalonica (Bulgarian: Битка при Солун) occurred in 1040 near the city of Thessalonica in contemporary Greece between the Bulgarians and the Byzantines. The battle ended with a Bulgarian victory.

== Origins of the Conflict ==
In 1018 the Byzantines conquered Bulgaria after a bitter half-century struggle. In 1040 one Delyan who claimed to be a descendant of the Bulgarian Emperor Samuil led an uprising against the Byzantine occupation which broke out in Belgrade and was proclaimed Emperor under the name Peter II after the sainted Emperor Peter I (927-969). At the same time local Bulgarians in Dyrrhachium, in what is now Albania, revolted under the officer Tihomir. The two leaders met and to avoid distraction Peter Delyan was chosen as the only commander of the rebel army and Tihomir was killed.

== The battle ==
After the two armies united Peter II Delyan marched eastwards to Thessalonica where at that time was the Byzantine Emperor Michael IV. The Byzantines were defeated and Michael IV had to flee for his life leaving his personal tent and large quantity of gold and silver.

== Aftermath ==
Soon the Bulgarian successes continued as they seized the important Adriatic port Dyrrhachium. Another army invaded Thessaly and seized its northern parts. That caused serious troubles for the government in Constantinople which had to act swiftly in order to stop the restoration of the Bulgarian Empire.

The Byzantines gained a victory over the Bulgarians later in the year in the Battle of Thessalonica (2nd 1040).
