= Uprising of Petar Delyan =

Bulgarian rebellion against the Eastern Roman Empire

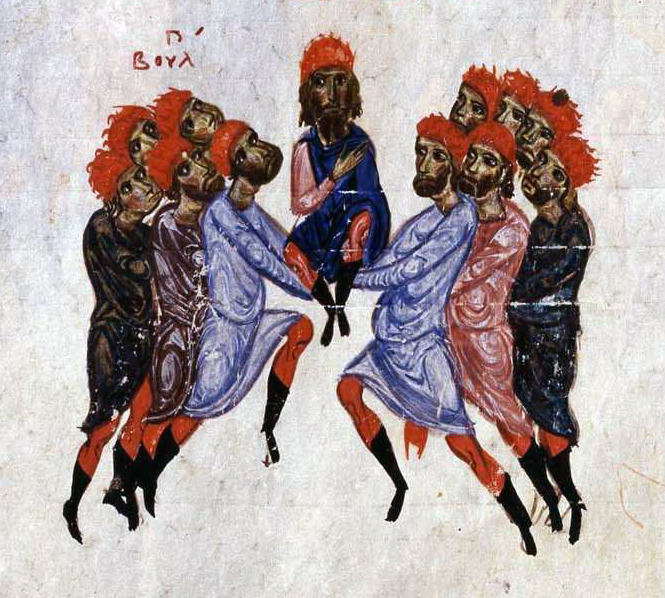
- Petar Delyan is proclaimed Emperor of Bulgaria in Belgrade.
Date	1040–1041
Location	Balkan Peninsula
Result	Uprising suppressed

Belligerents
Bulgarian rebels	Byzantine Empire; Varangian Guard

Commanders and leaders
Petar Delyan; Tihomir; Alusian	Michael IV the Paphlagonian; Harald Hardrada

The Uprising of Petar Delyan (Bulgarian: Въстанието на Петър Делян, Greek: Επανάσταση του Πέτρου Δελεάνου), which took place in 1040–1041, was a major Bulgarian rebellion against the Byzantine Empire in the Theme of Bulgaria. It was the largest and best-organised attempt to restore the former Bulgarian Empire until the rebellion of Ivan Asen I and Petar IV in 1185.

== Background ==
After Byzantine troops conquered Bulgaria in 1018, Basil II wisely decided not to change the Bulgarian taxation system in order to placate the population. Although the Bulgarian Patriarchate was downgraded to archbishopric, its head remained an ethnic Bulgarian till Basil II's death in 1025. Under the rule of Emperor Romanos III the population was forced to pay its taxes in coin rather than in goods-in-kind, which caused poverty and widespread unrest.

== Initial progress ==
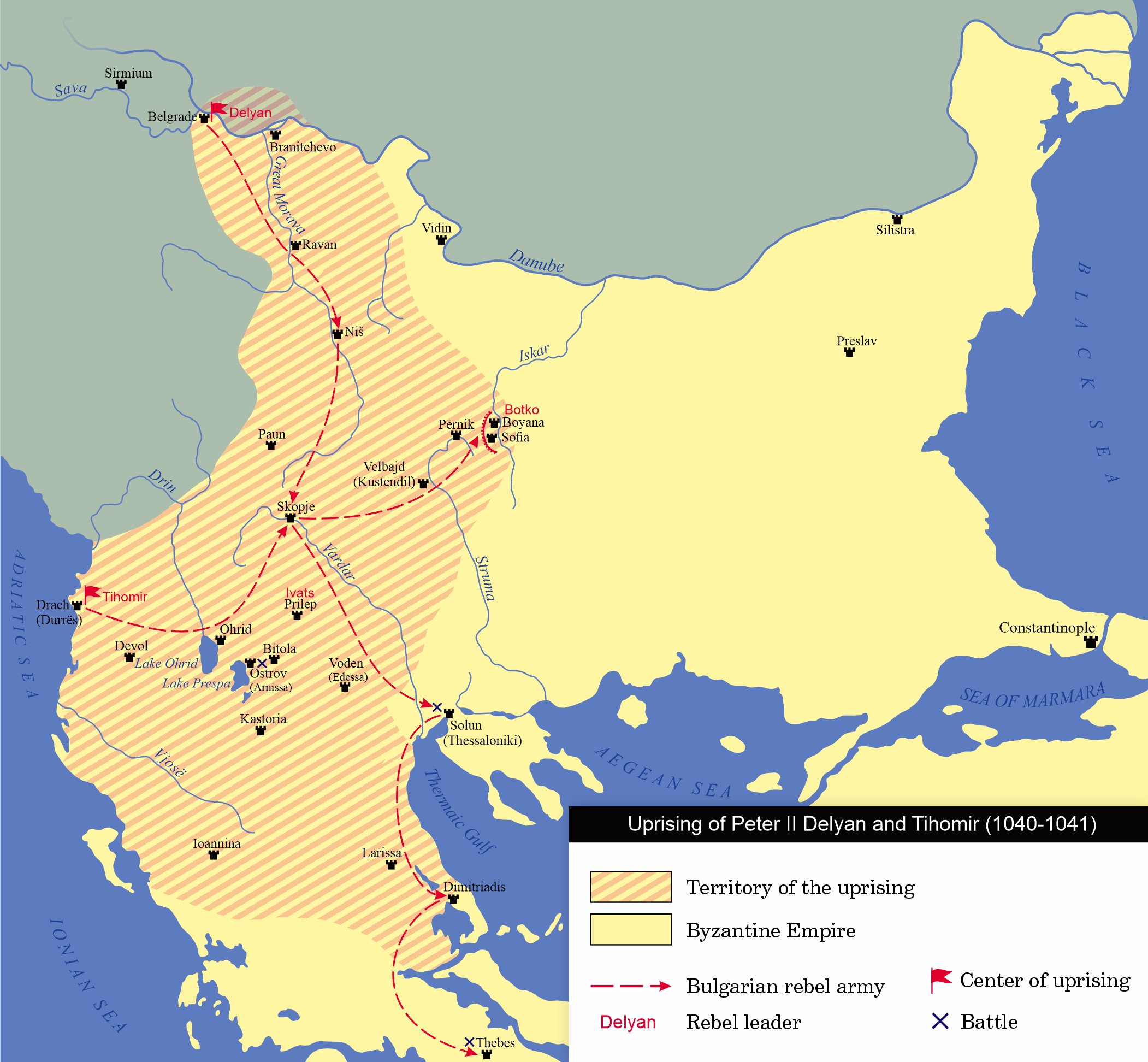
Uprising of Petar II Delyan and Tihomir

In 1040, Petar Delyan, who claimed to be a descendant of Samuil of Bulgaria escaped from Constantinople and began roaming throughout the Bulgarian lands, eventually reaching Morava and Belgrade. The rebellion broke out in Belgrade, where Delyan was proclaimed emperor of Bulgaria assuming the name of the sainted Emperor Petar I. The Bulgarians moved southwards towards the last political centres of their empire, Ohrid and Skopje. On their way the local population joined them, accepted Petar Delyan as emperor and killed every Byzantine they met. In the same time local Bulgarians from the Dyrrhachium area gathered around the soldier Tihomir and headed westwards to reach the old capitals. The existence of two separate rebel camps became an actual threat for the success of the rebellion. Petar Delyan wrote a letter to Tihomir to negotiate for joint actions and asked that they should choose only one leader, either him or Tihomir. As he had greater influence than his rival, Delyan was unanimously chosen as leader and Tihomir was killed.

With his enlarged army Petar II advanced to the south, surprised and defeated the Byzantine Emperor Michael IV the Paphlagonian at Thessaloniki. One of Michael's commanders the Bulgarian Manuel Ivats, probably a son of Samuil's boyar Ivats joined Petar II. After the victory the Bulgarian troops under the voivoda Kavkan captured Dyrrachium on the Adriatic Sea and some forces penetrated deep into Thessaly eventually reaching Corinth, Epirus and most of Macedonia were conquered. Another Bulgarian army led by Antim marched deep to the south and defeated the Byzantine commander Alakaseus in the battle of Thebes in Boeotia. Upon the news of the Bulgarian success the Byzantine population of Athens and Piraeus who were uneasy due to the heavy taxes also revolted but were quickly crushed by Norman mercenaries. The decisive actions of the rebels caused serious anxiety in Constantinople where plans for crushing the rebellion were hastily discussed.

== Arrival of Alusian ==
Maximum extent of territory controlled by Petar Delyan

Soon the news for the Bulgarian uprising reached Armenia, where the descendants of the last Bulgarian Emperors were deported. The most respected of them was the son of the last Emperor Ivan Vladislav, Alusian. Disguised as a mercenary he reached Constantinople and despite the strict security measures managed to go to Bulgaria in September 1040. The appearance of a new pretendent for the throne meant new tensions among the rebels. In the beginning Alusian did not dare to reveal his origin but tried to find devoted supporters of his kin. He proved his claims with a black spot on his right elbow and soon gathered many adherents.

Petar II Delyan warmly welcomed his cousin although he knew that Alusian might be a potential candidate for the crown. He gave him a 40,000 strong army to seize Thessaloniki but he failed. The defeat cost 15,000 dead.

== Alusian's Coup ==
The heavy defeat sharply worsened the relations between the two leaders: Alusian was ashamed by the defeat and Petar Delyan suspected treason. Alusian decided to act first and plotted against his cousin. He invited Delyan to a feast, where his followers served the Emperor many cups of wine. When Petar got drunk on the wine, the conspirators came down on him and pulled out his eyes with a knife. Alusian then undertook active operations but was defeated again and had to flee for his life. Then he secretly negotiated with the Byzantines.

== Suppression of the uprising ==
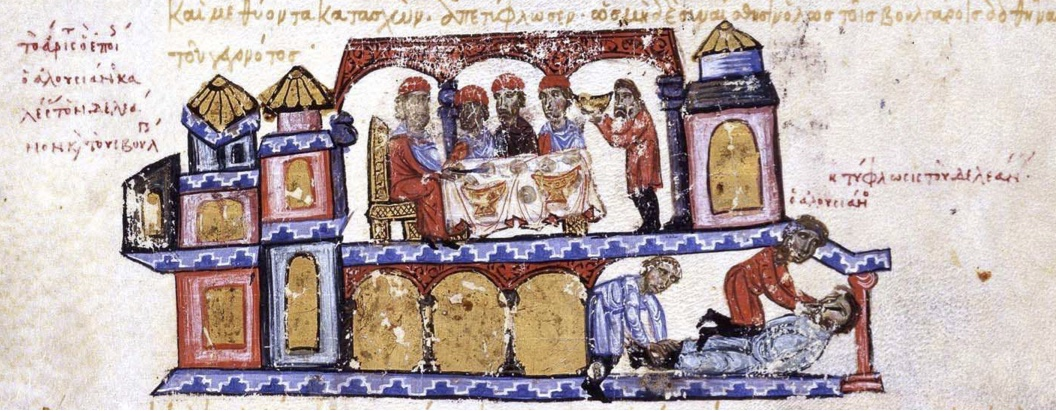
Alusian invites Petar Delyan to a banquet and has him blinded. Miniature from the Skylitzes Chronicle.

The Byzantine Emperor Michael IV prepared a major campaign to finally defeat the Bulgarians. He gathered an elite army of 40,000 men with capable generals and moved constantly in a battle formation. There were a lot of mercenaries in the Byzantine army including Harald Hardråde with 500 Varangians. From Thessaloniki the Byzantines penetrated in Bulgaria and defeated the Bulgarians at Ostrovo in the late summer of 1041. It seems that the Varangians had a decisive role in the victory as their chief is hailed in the Norse sagas as the "devastator of Bulgaria". Though blind, Petar Delyan was in command of the army. His fate is unknown; he either perished in the battle or was captured and taken to Constantinople.

Soon the Byzantines eliminated the resistance of Delyan's remaining voivodes, Botko around Sofia and Manuil Ivats in Prilep, thus ending the Bulgarian revolt.

== Gallery ==
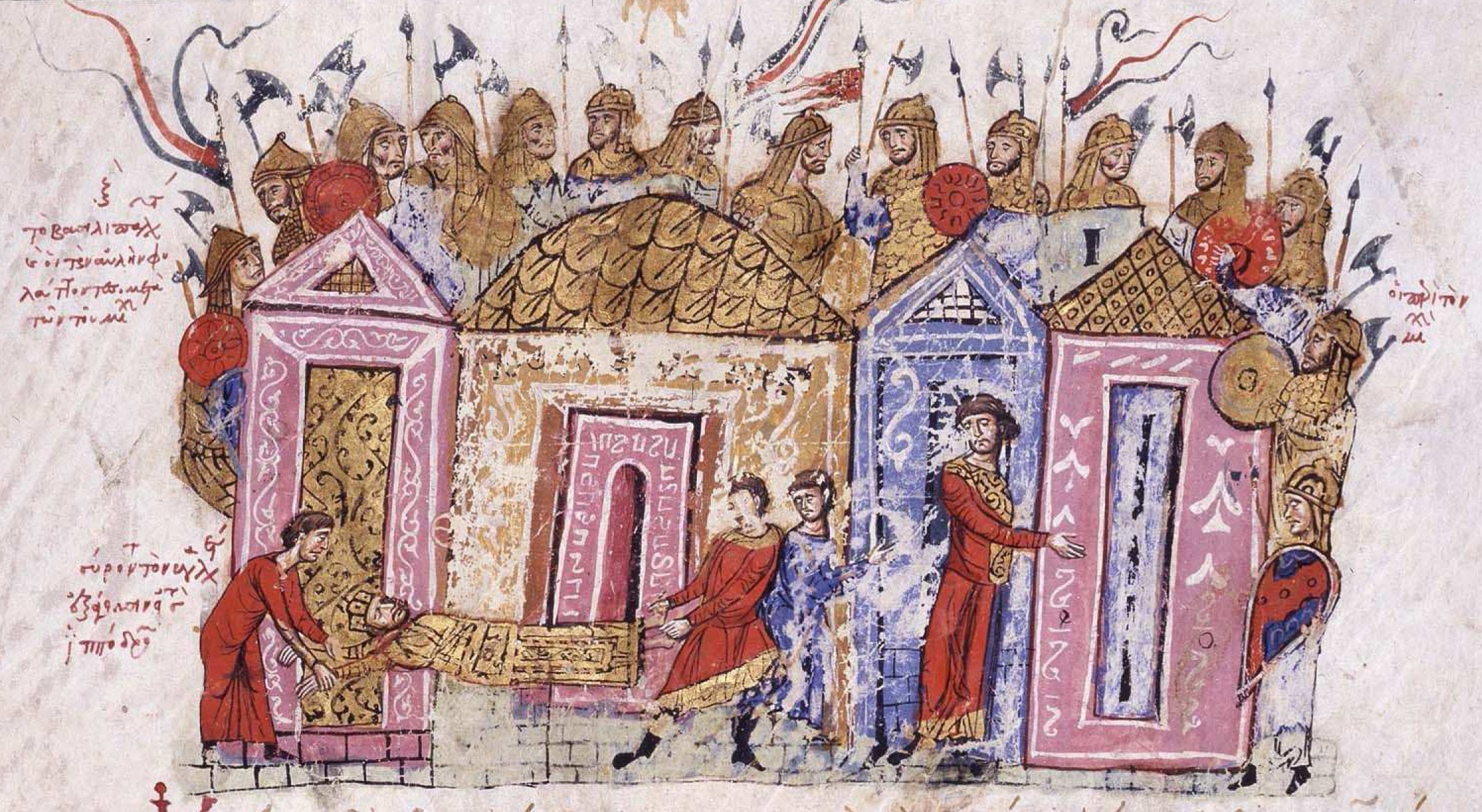
The Varangian Guard played a major role in the Bulgarian defeat

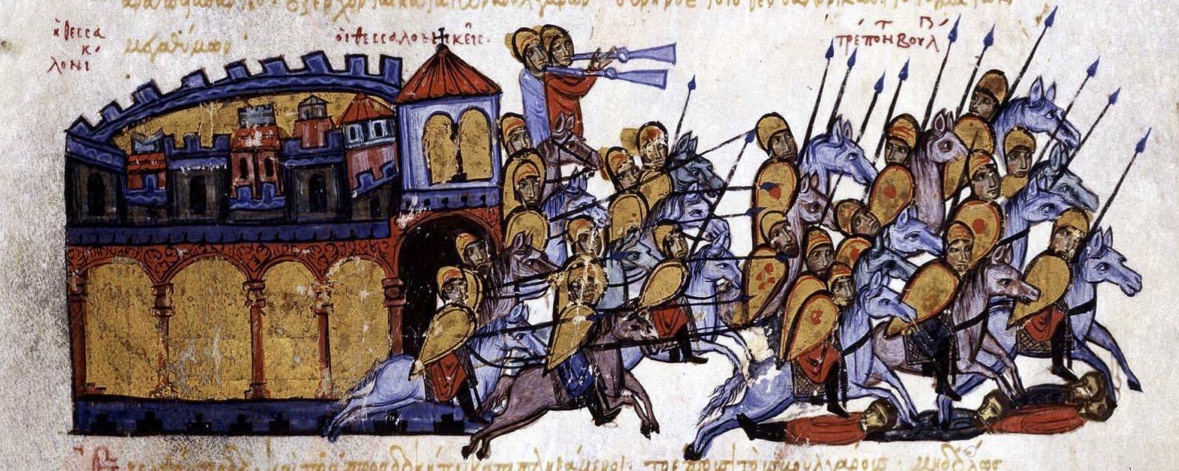
After its unsuccessful attack on Thessalonica, the Bulgarian army under Alusian flees. Miniature from the Skylitzes Chronicle

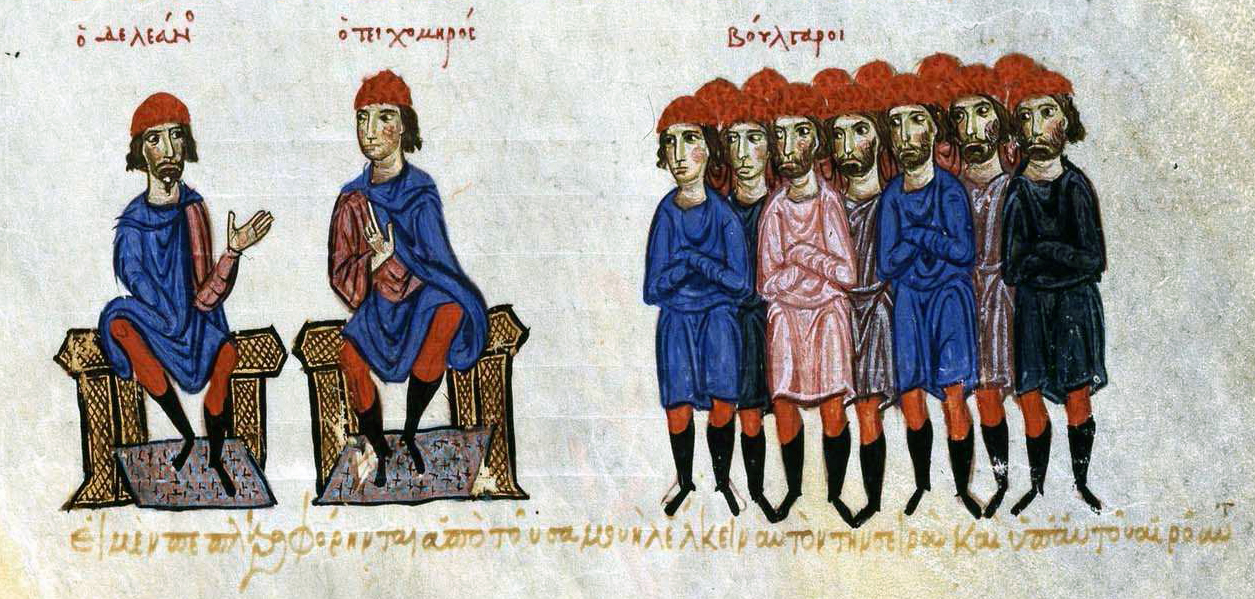
Petar Delyan, Tihomir and the Bulgarian rebels

== See also ==
- List of revolutions and rebellions
