= Peter of Bulgaria =

Peter of Bulgaria may refer to:

- Peter I of Bulgaria
- Peter Delyan, sometimes referred to as Peter II
- Constantine Bodin, sometimes referred to as Peter III
- Peter IV of Bulgaria, sometimes referred to as Peter II
