= Battle of Thessalonica (2nd 1040) =

Coordinates: 40°39′N 22°54′E

- Part of the Byzantine–Bulgarian wars
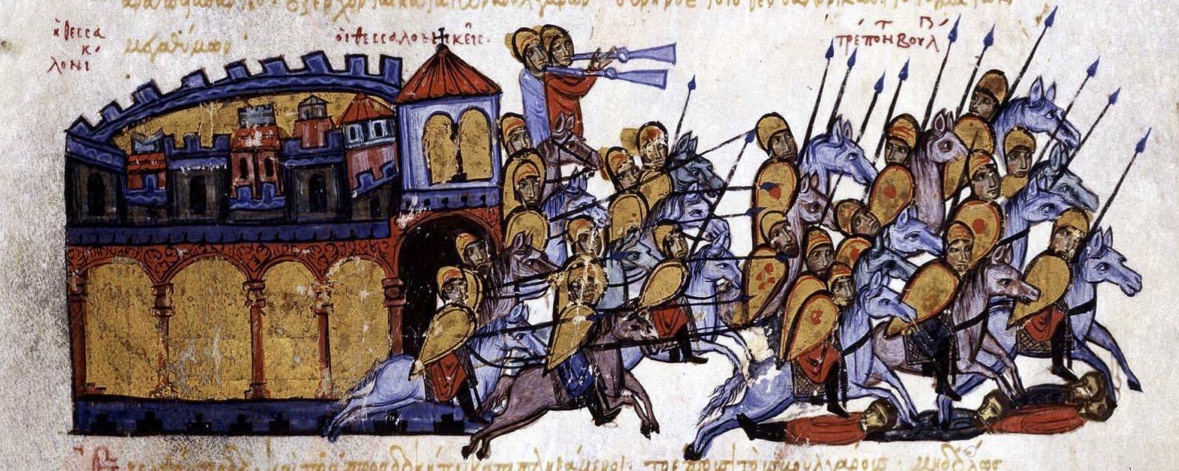
- The Byzantine counterattack after the failed siege
Date	Fall 1040
Location	near Thessaloniki, Greece
Result	Byzantine victory

Belligerents
Bulgarian Empire	Byzantine Empire

Commanders and leaders
Alusian of Bulgaria	Unknown

Strength
40,000	Unknown

Casualties and losses
15,000 killed	Unknown

The battle of Thessalonica (Bulgarian: Битка при Солун, Greek: Μάχη της Θεσσαλονίκης) took place in the fall of 1040 near the city of Thessalonica in contemporary Greece between the Bulgarians and the Byzantines. The battle ended with a Byzantine victory.

== Origins of the conflict ==
The news of the successes of the uprising of Peter Delyan, which broke out in the beginning of 1040 in Belgrade, soon reached Armenia, where many Bulgarian nobles were resettled after the fall of the First Bulgarian Empire in 1018. The most influential of these was Alusian, the second son of the last Bulgarian Emperor Ivan Vladislav (1015–1018). Dressed as a mercenary soldier he went to Constantinople from where he got to Bulgaria despite the strict control.

== The battle ==
His arrival would mean more tensions in the rebel camp because Alusian could also claim the throne and he kept his origin in secret until he found supporters. Peter II Delyan welcomed his cousin although he knew that Alusian might be a potential candidate for his crown. Peter II gave Alusian a 40,000-strong army to attack Thessalonica, the second largest city in the Byzantine Empire.

Alusian proved to be an incapable general: when he reached the city he attacked the Byzantine army with his tired troops. The Bulgarians could not fight effectively and were defeated. They suffered heavy casualties - 15,000 perished in the battle. Alusian fled, leaving his army behind.

== Aftermath ==
The catastrophe at Thessalonica worsened the relations between Peter Delyan and Alusian. The latter was ashamed from the defeat and Delyan suspected treason. Alusian decided to act first and after a feast in the beginning of 1041 he blinded the Emperor. After that Alusian tried to continue the rebellion, but defeated once more, he decided to change sides and abandoned his army again, an act that was richly rewarded in Constantinople.

Although blind, Peter Delyan faced the Byzantines with the rest of the Bulgarian army but was defeated in the battle of Ostrovo later that year and the uprising was crushed.
