= Peter II =

Peter II may refer to:

== Politics ==
- Peter (II) Delyan of Bulgaria (reigned 1040–1041), leader of the Macedonian uprising against the Byzantine Empire
- Peter IV of Bulgaria or Peter II, Emperor of Bulgaria 1185–1197
- Peter II of Aragon (1174–1213), King of Aragon and Count of Barcelona
- Peter II of Courtenay (died 1219)
- Peter II, Count of Savoy (1203–1268), called the Little Charlemagne
- Peter II of Sicily (1304-1342)
- Peter II of Cyprus (c. 1357–1382), called The Fat
- Peter II, Duke of Brittany (1418–1457), count of Montfort and titular earl of Richmond
- Peter II, Duke of Bourbon (1438–1503)
- Peter II of Portugal (1648–1706), King of Portugal and the Algarves
- Peter II of Russia (1715–1730)
- Peter II of Montenegro (1813–1851)
- Peter II of Brazil (1825–1891), second and last Emperor of Brazil
- Peter II, Grand Duke of Oldenburg (1827–1900)
- Peter II of Yugoslavia (1923–1970)
- Peter II (cat) (1946–1947), Chief Mouser to the UK Cabinet Office

== Religion ==
- Peter II of Alexandria, 21st Patriarch of Alexandria from 373 to 381 AD
- Manuel Corral (1934–2011), Pope of the Palmarian Catholic Church as Peter II from 2005 to 2011

== See also ==
- Pedro II (disambiguation)
- Pope Peter II (disambiguation)
