= Pedro of Brazil =

Pedro of Brazil may refer to:

- Pedro I of Brazil (1798–1834; r. 1822–1831), founder of the Empire of Brazil
- Pedro II of Brazil (1825–1891; r. 1831–1889), son of Pedro I and final ruler of the Empire of Brazil
- Pedro Afonso, Prince Imperial of Brazil (1848–1850), son of Pedro II

== See also ==
- Pedro, Prince of Brazil (1712–1714), son of John V, King of Portugal
- Pedro II (disambiguation)
