= Pedro IV =

Pedro IV may refer to:

- Peter IV of Aragon (1319–1387)
- Pedro IV of Kongo (ruled 1694–1718)
- Pedro I of Brazil (Pedro IV of Portugal, 1798–1834)

== See also ==
- Peter IV (disambiguation)
