= Petar I =

Petar I may refer to:

- Petar I of Bulgaria (r. 927-969), Emperor (Tsar) of Bulgaria
- Petar I Petrović-Njegoš (1747–1830), Montenegrin ruler, metropolitan and saint
- Peter I of Serbia (1844–1921), Serbian king

== See also ==
- Peter I (disambiguation)
