= Pedro II (disambiguation) =

Pedro II (1825–1891; r. 1831–1889) was Emperor of Brazil.

Pedro II may also refer to:

== People ==
- Pedro II of Aragon (1178–1213; r. 1196–1213), King of Aragon
- Pedro II of Kongo (c. 1575 – 1624; r. 1622–1624), Manikongo (ruler of the Kingdom of Kongo)
- Pedro II of Portugal (1648–1706; r. 1683–1706), King of Portugal

== Places ==
- Pedro II, Piauí, Brazil
- Pedro II (São Paulo Metro), a station on Line 3, Brazil

== See also ==
- Parque Dom Pedro II, São Paulo, Brazil
- Pedro of Brazil (disambiguation)
- Peter II (disambiguation)
