= Peter I =

Peter I may refer to:

== Religious hierarchs ==
- Saint Peter (c. 1 AD – c. 64–68 AD), a.k.a. Simon Peter, Simeon, or Simon, apostle of Jesus
- Pope Peter I of Alexandria (died 311), revered as a saint
- Peter I of Armenia (died 1058), Catholicos of the Armenian Apostolic Church
- Peter I (bishop of León) (died after June 1112)
- Peter I (archbishop of Lyon) (died 1139), a Benedictine monk

== Rulers ==
- Peter I of Bulgaria (died 970), emperor (tsar) of Bulgaria
- Peter I of Savoy (c. 1048–1078), count of Savoy
- Peter I of Aragon and Navarre (c. 1068–1104), King of Aragon and Pamplona
- Peter I of Barcelona, Peter II the Catholic (1178–1213), King of Aragon, Count of Barcelona
- Peter I of Constantinople (died 1219), emperor, Peter II of Courtenay
- Peter I, Duke of Brittany (1187–1250), Peter Mauclerc
- Peter I, Count of Urgell (1187–1258), second son of King Sancho I of Portugal
- Peter I of Valencia (1239–1285), Peter the Great, Peter III of Aragon, king
- Peter I, Duke of Bourbon (1311–1356), second Duke of Bourbon
- Peter I of Portugal (1320–1367), king of Portugal, Peter the Just, Peter the Cruel
- Peter I of Cyprus (1328–1369), Pierre I de Lusignan, king of Cyprus and titular King of Jerusalem
- Peter of Castile (1334 –1369), king of Castile and León, Peter the Just, Peter the Cruel
- Petru I of Moldavia, prince of Moldavia 1367–1368
- Peter I, Count of Saint-Pol (1390–1433), Peter of Luxembourg
- Pedro I of Kongo (ruled 1543–1545), Pedro I Nkanga a Mvemba
- Peter the Great (1672–1725), Peter I, first Russian czar to be titled emperor
- Peter I of the Miskito nation, ruled 1729–1739
- Peter I of Montenegro (1747–1830), Petar I Petrović-Njegoš, legate of Serbian Orthodox Church
- Peter I, Grand Duke of Oldenburg (1755–1829), Peter Frederick Louis of Holstein-Gottorp
- Pedro I of Brazil (1798–1834), founder and first ruler of the Empire of Brazil
- Peter I of Serbia (1844–1921), the last King of Serbia

== See also ==
- Peter I Island, Norwegian uninhabited volcanic island in the Bellingshausen Sea
- Petar I (disambiguation)
- Pedro I (disambiguation)
- King Peter (disambiguation)
