= Pedro I =

Pedro I may refer to:

== People ==
- Pedro I Fadrique (d. between 1350 and 1355; r. 1338 – between 1350 and 1355), Count of Salona
- Pedro I of Portugal (1320–1367; r. 1357–1367), King of Portugal
- Pedro I of Castile (1334–1369; r. 1350–1366, 1367–1369), King of Castile and León
- Pedro I of Kongo (1478–1566; r. 1543–1545), Manikongo (ruler of the Kingdom of Kongo)
- Pedro I of Brazil (1798–1834), Emperor of Brazil (r. 1822–1831) and King of Portugal (r. 1826)

== Other uses ==
- Brazilian ship Pedro I

== See also ==
- Peter I (disambiguation)
- Wyreema, an Australian steamer that was sold to Brazil as Dom Pedro I
