= Peter VII of Alexandria =

Peter VII of Alexandria may refer to:

- Pope Peter VII of Alexandria (ruled in 1809–1852), Coptic Pope and Patriarch of Alexandria
- Patriarch Peter VII of Alexandria (ruled in 1996–2004), Eastern Orthodox Pope and Patriarch of Alexandria
