= Peter IV =

Peter IV may refer to:

- Pope Peter IV of Alexandria (ruled 565–569)
- Patriarch Peter IV of Alexandria (ruled 643–651)
- Peter IV of Ravenna (927–971)
- Peter IV of Bulgaria (ruled 1185–1197)
- Peter IV of Aragon (1319–1387)
- Peter IV of Portugal (I of Brazil) (1798–1834)
- Ignatius Peter IV, Syriac Orthodox Patriarch of Antioch in 1872–1894

== See also ==
- Pedro IV (disambiguation)
