= Peter VI =

Peter VI may refer to:

- Patriarch Peter VI of Alexandria (7th–8th centuries)
- Pope Peter VI of Alexandria (1718–1726)

== See also ==
- Pedro VI of Kongo
