= Pope Peter II =

Pope Peter II may refer to:

- Patriarch Peter II of Alexandria, Patriarch of Alexandria from 373 to 381
- Manuel Corral, leader of the Palmarian Christian Church from 2005 to 2011 under the title Pope Peter II
- Peter the Roman, a future pope mentioned in the Prophecy of the Popes
