= Peter V =

Peter V may refer to:

- Patriarch Peter V of Alexandria (7th–8th centuries)
- Pope Peter V of Alexandria (ruled 1340–1348)
- Peter V of Aragon (IV of Barcelona) (1429–1466), Constable of Portugal and Grand Master of the Order of Aviz
- Peter V of Portugal (1837–1861), King of Portugal and the Algarves from 1853 to 1861
- Peter V of Kongo, king of Kongo from 1859 to 1891
