= Tihomir (Bulgarian noble) =

Bulgarian nobleman

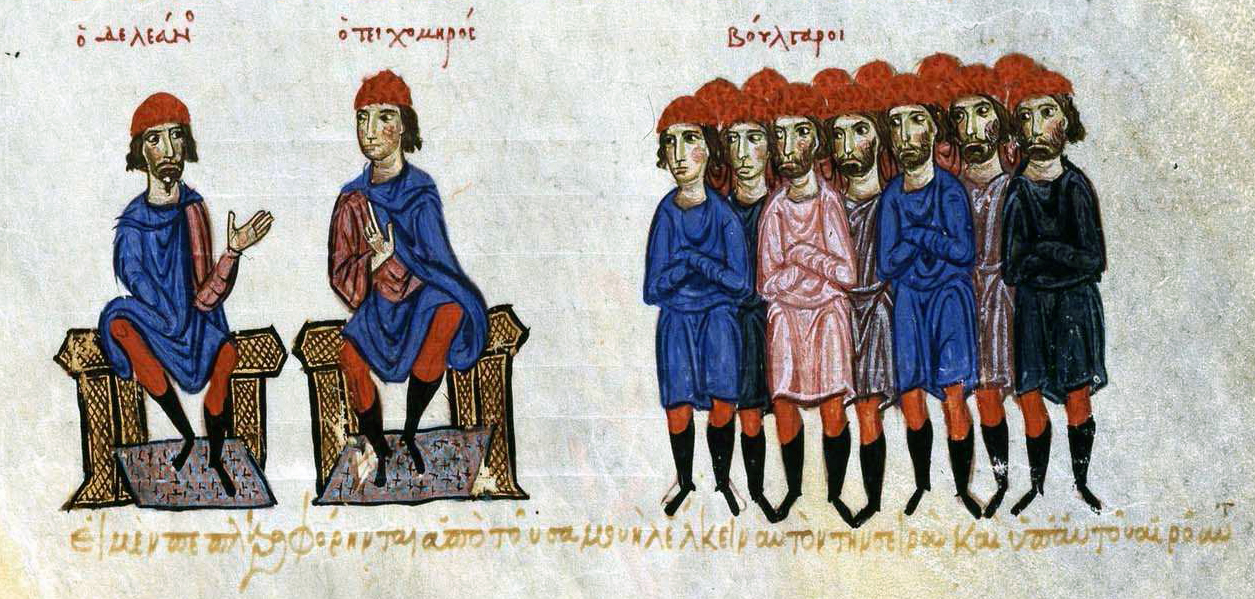
Peter Delyan and Tihomir

Tihomir (Bulgarian: Тихомир; Greek: Τειχομηρὁς, romanized: Teichomeros) was an 11th-century Bulgarian military commander of Dyrrhachium, who had been sent to tackle an uprising in the north headed by the Bulgarian noble Peter Delyan. He defected and joined him, but later came into conflict with Delyan because he had his own claim to the throne.

== Background ==
In 1040, Peter Delyan revolted against the Byzantine rule in the Theme of Bulgaria. The Uprising first broke out in Belgrade where Delyan was proclaimed Emperor. He went south, going through Rascia and Dendra, then taking the Byzantine fortresses of Naissus and Skopie.

The strategos Basil Synadenus of Dyrrhachium raised an army from the surrounding lands and marched out to confront the rebels, but his position was undermined by one of his own subordinates, Michael Dermocaites, who complained falsely to the Emperor about Basil's disorderly behavior and had him arrested. Dermocaites took over the troops, but quickly lost support because they wanted to choose one of their own, Tihomir.

== The revolt ==
The troops of Tihomir were to be sent towards the north, Belgrade and Margum, where they would attack Delyan. Tihomir instead joined him.

Tihomir was also proclaimed emperor separate from Delyan, who knew that the existence of two separate rebel leaders and camps would be problematic for the revolt and invited Tihomir to a meeting. During this meeting a debate was held between them and Delyan made the more convincing speech, stating that an army with two leaders will inevitably fail in their common goal. He stated that the Bulgarians should choose only one leader and that since he was the son of Gavril Radomir and descendant of the heroic Emperor Samuil, they should proclaim him as sole leader and emperor. As a result of losing this debate, Tihomir was deposed and killed.

== See also ==
- Uprising of Peter Delyan
