= Battle of Ostrovo =

1041 battle of the Uprising of Petar Delyan

- Part of the Uprising of Peter Delyan
Date	1041
Location	near Lake Ostrovo, Greece 40°48′00″N 21°50′00″E
Result	Byzantine victory; End of Bulgarian uprising

Belligerents
Bulgarian rebels	Byzantine Empire

Commanders and leaders
Peter Delyan	Michael IV the Paphlagonian; Harald Hardrada
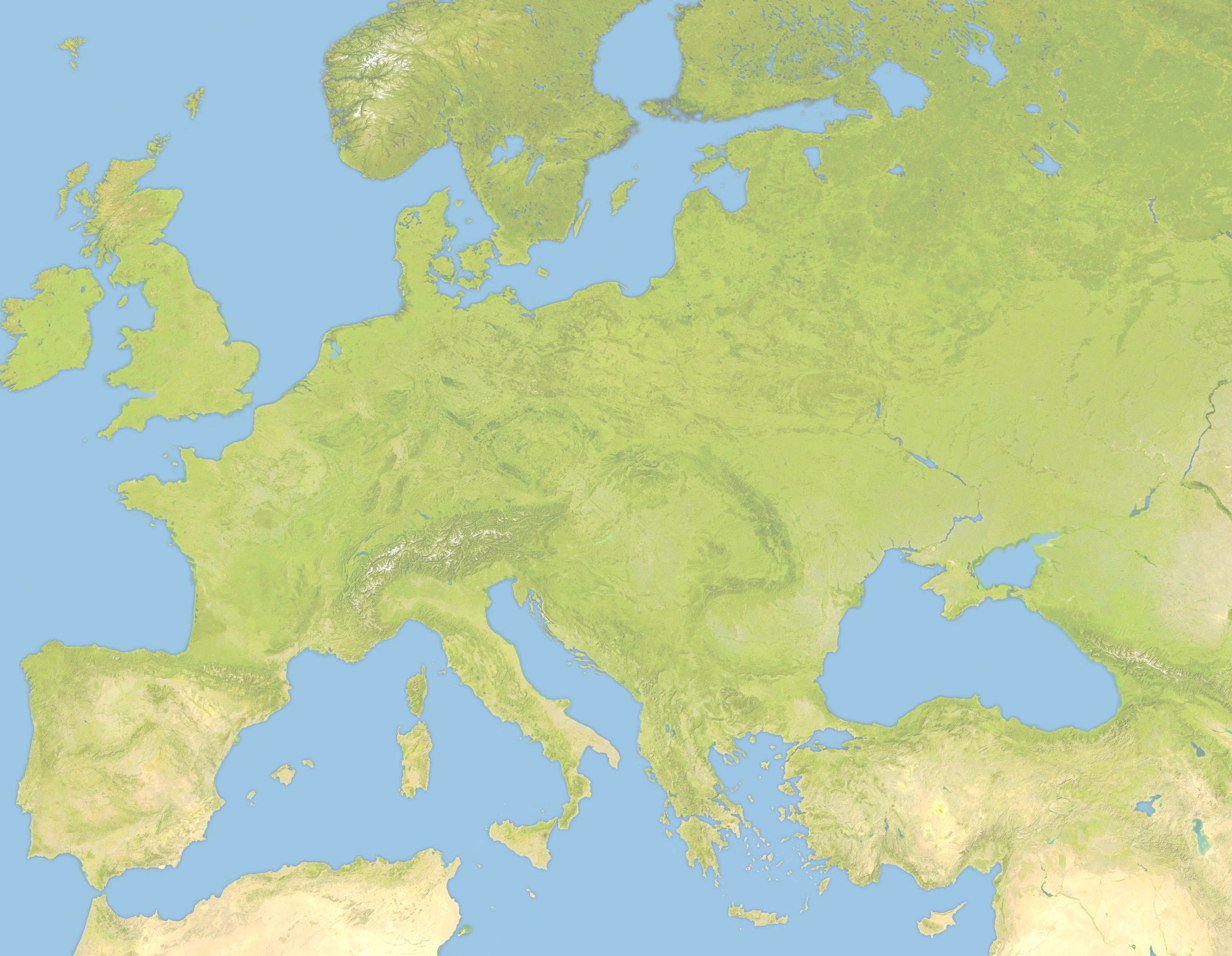
- Location within Greece Battle of Ostrovo (North Macedonia) Battle of Ostrovo (Europe without the extreme north)

The Battle of Ostrovo occurred in 1041 near Ostrovo, an area close to the lake of the same name in modern Northern Greece.

== History ==
In 1040 Peter Delyan, an illegitimate relative of Samuel, the Bulgarian Tsar, led an uprising against the Byzantines and was proclaimed Emperor of Bulgaria. He quickly occupied the western Balkan lands from Belgrade to Larissa but in the next year he was betrayed by his cousin Alusian, who blinded him with a knife after he got drunk during a feast. Though blind, Peter Delyan remained in command and met the Byzantines near Ostrovo. The battle itself is unclear but the Bulgarians were defeated mainly with the help of the Varangian Guard, led by Harald Hardrada. Delyan was captured and was sent to Thessaloniki. Alusian, who initially sought to lead the army against the Byzantines, secretly negotiated a deal with Emperor Michael IV at Mosynopolis and was rewarded with a title of magistros. During the battle, he rode to the safety of enemy lines, leaving the Bulgarian army to be crushed. As a result, the uprising was repulsed and the emperor entered Bulgaria, which remained a Byzantine province until 1185.
