= Petar Delyan =

- Tsar of Bulgaria
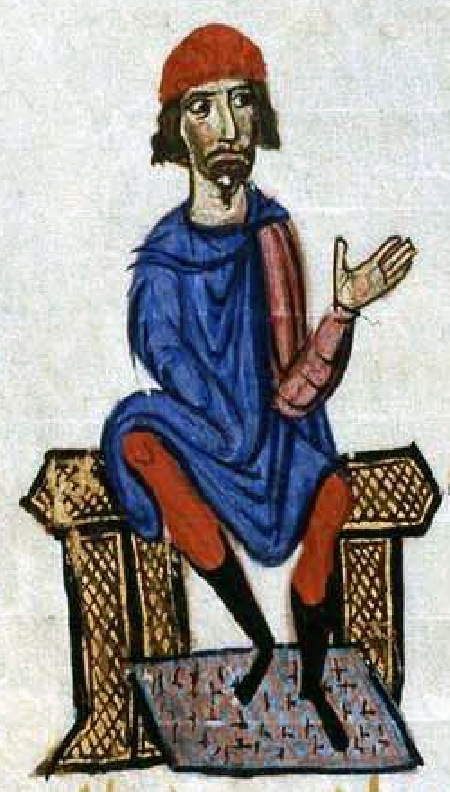
- Reign: 1040–1041
- Predecessor: Presian II
- Successor: Constantine Bodin
- Died: 1041
- House: Comitopuli
- Father: Gavril Radomir
- Mother: Marguerite of Hungary

Petar Delyan (reigned 1040–1041) (Bulgarian: Петър Делян; Greek: Πέτρος Δελεάνος), sometimes enumerated as Petar II, (Петър II) was the leader of a major Bulgarian uprising against Byzantine rule in the Theme of Bulgaria during the summer of 1040. He was proclaimed Tsar of Bulgaria, as Samuel's grandson in Belgrade, then in the theme of Bulgaria. His original name may have been simply Delyan, in which case he assumed the name Petar II upon accession, commemorating the sainted Emperor Petar I (Petăr I), who had died in 970. The exact year of his birth cannot be ascertained with certainty, but it is believed to have taken place during the early 11th century, likely between 1000 and 1014. Similarly, the year of his death is estimated to be 1041.

== Origin ==
His origin is not clear. He claimed that he was son of Emperor Gavril Radomir and grandson of Samuel of Bulgaria, but he could also be a local who became leader of the uprising and claimed to be Samuel's grandson to justify his proclamation as Tsar of Bulgaria.

=== Delyan as Radomir's son ===
Those who believe he actually was Radomir's son, think that he was born from Radomir's marriage with Marguerite, sister of King Stephen I of Hungary (996/997). Petar's mother was expelled while pregnant from Samuel's court before the accession of Gavril Radomir, but given Delyan's subsequent career, it is likely that he had been born and remained in Bulgaria with his father.

After Ivan Vladislav's murder of Gavril Radomir in 1015 and the conquest of Bulgaria by the Byzantine Empire in 1018, Delyan was taken captive to Constantinople and became a servant of an unidentified member of the Byzantine aristocracy. He later escaped and went to his mother's country of Hungary, whence he returned to Bulgaria and raised a revolt against the Byzantine rule, taking advantage of the discontent over the imposition of taxes in coin by the Byzantine government.

=== Delyan as a local Bulgarian ===
Those who oppose the theory that he was Samuel's grandson and believe he was merely a local Bulgarian claim that he was proclaimed as tsar in Belgrade not because it was the first border town between the Byzantine Empire and Hungary that he reached when he joined them as a prince of royal blood, but merely because it was the first important town that the rebels captured.

They also claim that it is highly unlikely that Ivan Vladislav, who in 1015 murdered his cousin Gavril Radomir (Delyan's supposed father) and his then wife Maria to seize the throne, would not kill Radomir's son and heirs, if he had them, in order to secure himself. It is known that Ivan Vladislav also ordered the execution of the Serbian prince of Duklja, Jovan Vladimir, who was Samuel's son-in-law (married to his daughter Theodora Kosara), because Vladimir was a threat to his position as Bulgarian tsar.

== Uprising ==
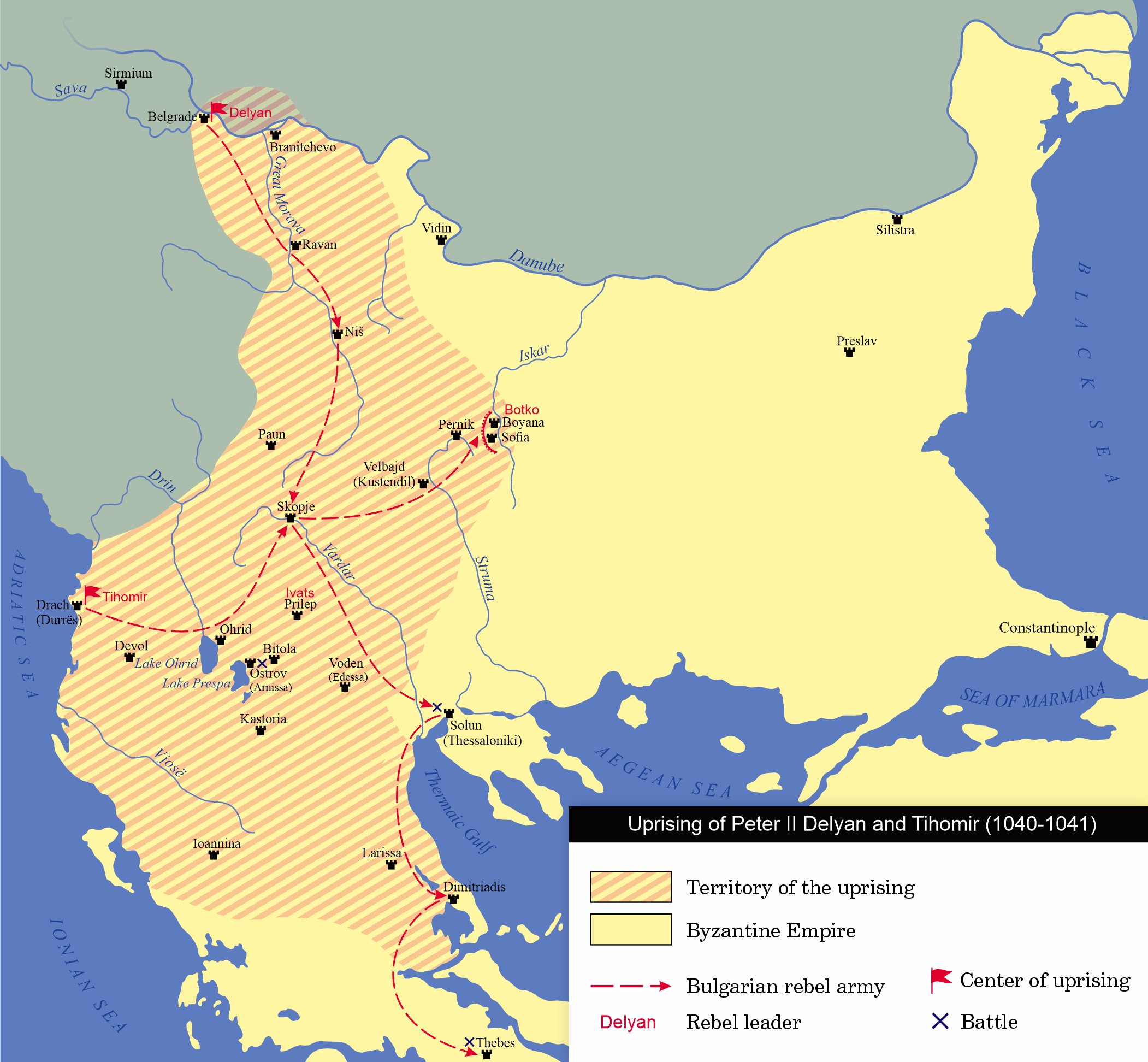
Uprising of Petar II Delyan and Tihomir

Petar Delyan was a leader of an uprising that broke out in the summer of 1040 in the Theme of Bulgaria against the Byzantine Empire. There were two main causes:

- The replacement of the Bulgarian Archbishop of Ohrid with a Greek speaking Roman (1037) and the beginning of the process of Hellenisation
- Imposition of taxes in coin for local people by the Byzantine government

The uprising spread and rebels very quickly took control over the northern part of Pomoravlje and liberated Belgrade. Delyan was proclaimed emperor (Tsar) of Bulgaria there and took the name Petar II after being raised atop a shield by leaders of the resistance. He had been proclaimed legitimate as the grandson of Samuel. He perhaps enjoyed some support from the Kingdom of Hungary.

Bulgaria under Petar II Delyan

Petar II Delyan took Niš and Skopje, first co-opting and then eliminating another potential leader in the person of one Tihomir, who had led a rebellion in the region of Dyrrhachium. After this Petar II (or Petar) marched on Thessalonica, where the Byzantine Emperor Michael IV was staying. Defeated, he fled, leaving his treasury to a certain Michael Ivač. The latter, who was probably a son of Ivač, a general under Samuel of Bulgaria, promptly turned over the bulk of the treasury to Petar outside the city. Thessalonica remained in Byzantine hands, but Macedonia, Dyrrachium, and other parts of northern Greece were taken by Petar II's forces. This inspired further Slavic revolts against Byzantine rule in Epirus and Albania.

Petar II Delyan's successes ended, however, with the interference of his cousin Alusian. Alusian, whose father Ivan Vladislav had murdered Petar's father Gavril Radomir in 1015, joined Petar II's ranks as an apparent deserter from the Byzantine court, where he had been disgraced. Alusian was welcomed by Petar II, who gave him an army with which to attack Thessalonica. The siege, however, was raised by the Byzantines, and the army was defeated. Alusian barely escaped and returned to Ostrovo.

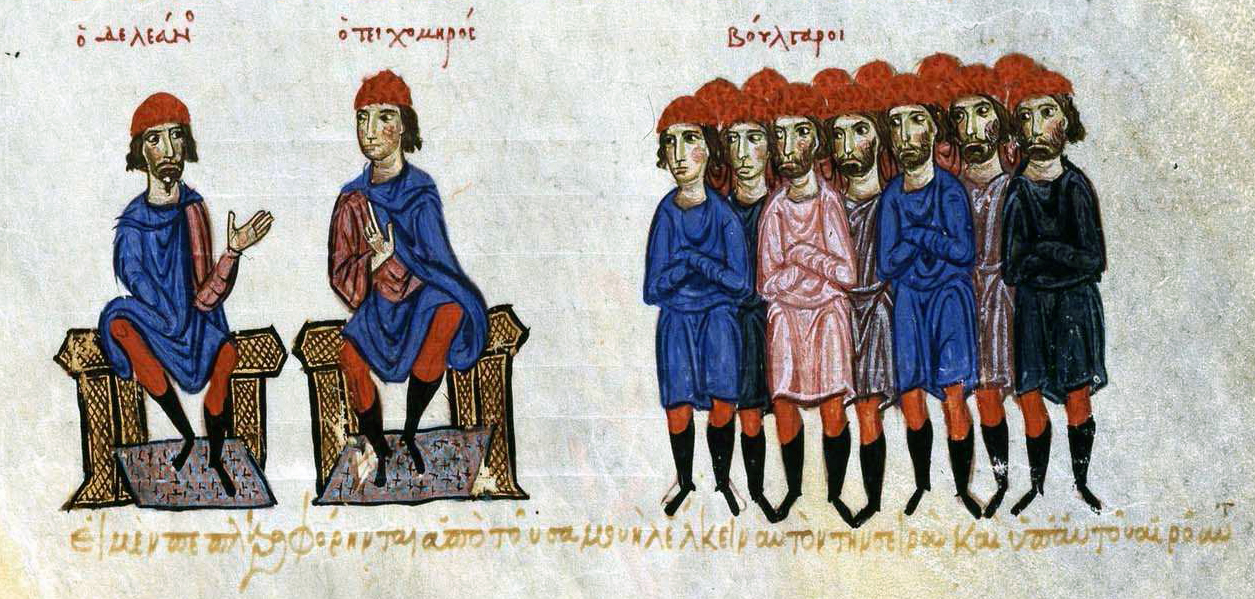
Petar Delyan, Tihomir and the Bulgarian rebels.

In 1041, one night during dinner, while Delyan was drunk, Alusian cut off his nose and blinded him with a kitchen knife. Since Alusian was of the blood of Samuel of Bulgaria, he was quickly proclaimed emperor in Petar II's place by his troops, but he conspired to defect to the Byzantines. As the Bulgarian and Byzantine troops were preparing for battle, Alusian deserted to the enemy and headed for Constantinople, where his possessions and lands were restored to him, and he was rewarded with the high court rank of magistros.

Meanwhile, though blind, Petar II Delyan resumed command of the Bulgarian forces, but the Byzantine Emperor Michael IV determined to take advantage of the situation and advanced against them. In an obscure battle of Ostrovo, the Byzantines defeated the Bulgarian troops and Petar II Delyan was captured and taken to Constantinople, where he was perhaps executed. According to some legends he was later exiled to a monastery in Iskar Gorge, in the Balkan Mountains, where he died.

Norse sagas refer to the participation of the future Norwegian King Harald Hardrada, who allegedly cut down Petar II in the field of battle as a member of the Varangian Guard. This tradition may be supported by a laconic reference in the so-called "Bulgarian Apocryphal Chronicle". In either case, Petar II Delyan might have perished in 1041.

== Family tree ==
Comita; Nikola	Ripsimia of Armenia
Aron	Moses	David	Samuil of Bulgaria	Agatha
Ivan; Vladislav	Theodora; Kosara	Miroslava	Irene of Larissa	Gavril; Radomir	Hungarian princess
several sons & daughters	Petar Delyan

== Honour ==
Delyan Point on Smith Island in the South Shetland Islands, Antarctica is named after Petar Delyan.

== See also ==
- Bulgarians
- History of Bulgaria
- South Slavs

== Notes ==
Preceded by Presian II (1018) and Byzantine Rule	Emperor of Bulgaria; 1040–1041	Succeeded by Byzantine Rule and Constantin Bodin as Petar III (1072)
