= Michael, Bulgarian despot =

Michael
- Despot
- Born: unknown
- Died: before 1330?
- Spouse: Helena or Anna?
- House: Shishman
- Father: Michael Asen III "Shishman"
- Mother: Ana of Serbia?

Michael (Bulgarian: Михаил, Mihail) was a son of Emperor (tsar) Michael Asen III "Shishman" of Bulgaria (1323–1330), and probably his first wife, Ana, daughter of King Stefan Uroš II Milutin of Serbia by Elizabeth of Hungary. He is attested solely in a fresco in the Church of the Holy Mother of God at Donja Kamenica, now in Serbia, which attests that he held the title of despot at some point after his father's accession in 1323. The various possibilities for the precise identification and chronological placement of the despot Michael carry significant implications for both the political history and social practice of medieval Bulgaria.

== Evidence ==
The frescoes in the church at Donja Kamenica depict what is apparently a married couple, with the despot on the right and his wife on the left. Both wear elaborate crowns and clothing, possibly more ornate than those of others of their rank. The badly damaged inscription next to the despot reads "Despot Michael, in Christ the God faithful son of Emperor Michael" (Михаиль деспо[ть] вь х(рист)а б(ог)а вѣрень с(ы)нь Михаила ц(а)рѣ). The inscription next to the wife is more damaged, with only the title despotica and the word "daughter" being legible enough, although her name has been tentatively restored as Helena or Anna.

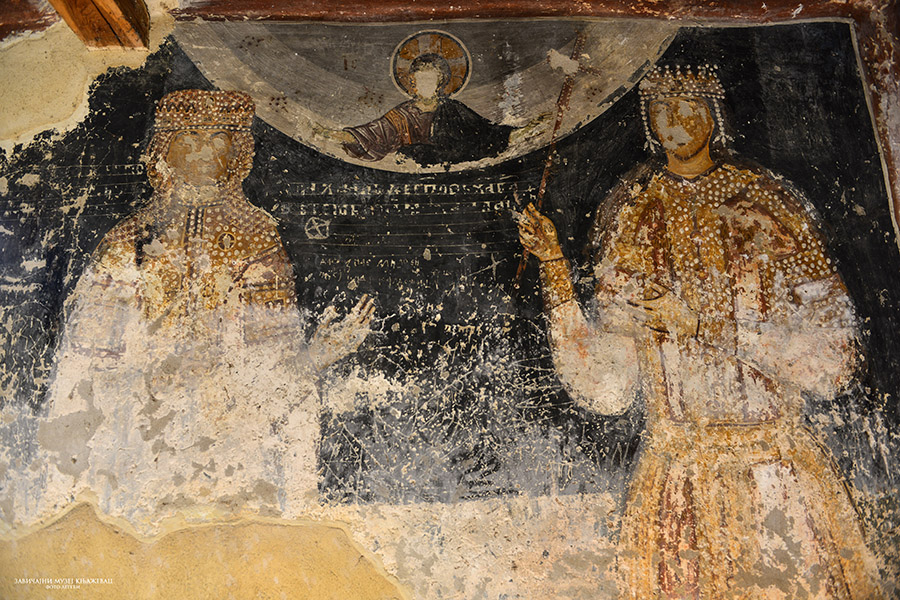
Depiction of the despot Michael and his wife at Donja Kamenica.

== Interpretation ==
Amid numerous interpretations of the limited evidence, there prevailed that of Ivan Božilov: assuming that the future emperor Ivan Stephen was the eldest son of Michael Asen III "Shishman" and Ana of Serbia, and that he had been associated on the throne by his father, Michael must have been the second son, rewarded with the highest court dignity of despot; that Michael was given his father's semi-autonomous principality of Vidin as appanage, and that he probably died before 1330.

While the identification of the despot Michael as a son of Emperor Michael Asen III has been upheld, other aspects of Božilov's interpretation have been challenged. Tenčo Popov reviewed the grounds for assuming Ivan Stephen was his father's eldest son and co-ruler, and determined that the rare coinage that had been cited in support for this identification was rather a posthumous commemorative issue seeking to advertise either Ivan Stephen or his cousin Ivan Alexander as Michael Asen III's legitimate heir. Popov further proposed that Michael was in fact the eldest son, that this was reflected in the bestowal of the title of despot on him, but that he predeceased his father, leaving Ivan Stephen as the eldest surviving son.

A different approach was adopted by Petăr Nikolov-Zikov, who proposed that the despot Michael was actually a son of Emperor Michael Asen III and his second wife, Theodora Palaiologina, the widow of the earlier Bulgarian emperor Theodore Svetoslav. Nikolov-Zikov asserts that the despot Michael could not have been an older brother of Ivan Stephen and conjectures that Michael was made despot and placed in charge of Vidin by his cousin, Emperor Ivan Alexander, after the latter suppressed the rebellion of his uncle Belaur in 1336/1337. This hypothesis represents a partial return to that of Dmitrij Polivjannij, who dated the presence of despot Mikhail in northwestern Bulgaria to the period 1332–1341, which was contested by Ivan Božilov.

Along a more significantly differing trajectory, while Dragana Frfulanović considered the identification of the despot Michael with a son of Michael Asen III plausible, she preferred to see him as a son of Ivan Alexander's eldest son and co-ruler Michael Asen IV instead. To overcome the explicit source evidence that Michael Asen IV's widow Maria Palaiologina returned to Constantinople childless in 1355, she asserts that such a supposedly erroneous statement either suited the rhetorical needs of the source, Nikephoros Gregoras, or was due to misinformation. Frfulanović further assumes that there is no specific evidence requiring the despot Michael to rule Vidin, that would otherwise preclude his dating to the late 1350s and 1360s, as he could have held his less extensive domains from his uncle Ivan Sratsimir.

The limited source evidence does not permit a definitive resolution of the problems around the identity of the despot Michael, but perhaps Popov's solution poses the least problems for the explicit and circumstantial evidence. One additional issue, the potential identification of Michael with the Bulgarian prince in Italy, Lodovico, can be considered unlikely.

== Sources ==
- Andreev, Jordan, et al., Koj koj e v srednovekovna Bălgarija, 3rd ed., Sofia, 2012.
- Burnand, Teodora, Cărkvata "Sv. Bogorodica" v s. Dolna Kamenica (XIV v.), Sofia, 2008.
- Burmov, Aleksandăr, Istorija na Bălgarija prez vremeto na Šišmanovci (1323–1396 g.), in Izbrani proizvedenija 1, Sofia, 1968: 220-281.
- Božilov, Ivan, Familijata na Asenevci (1186–1460), Sofia, 1985.
- Frfulanović, Dragana, "Čija je crkva u Donjoj Kamenici?" Zbornik radova Filozofskog fakulteta, Univerzitet u Prištini 28-29 (1998–1999, published 2001) 299-341. online
- Mladjov, Ian, "The Bulgarian Prince and would-be Emperor Lodovico," Bulgaria Mеdiaevalis 2 (2011), 603–618. online
- Mladjov, Ian, "Monarchs' Names and Numbering in the Second Bulgarian State," Studia Ceranea 5 (2015) 267-310 online.
- Nikolov-Zikov, Petăr, Domăt na Šišman, Sofia, 2021.
- Petković, Vladimir, Pregled crkvenih spomenika kroz povesnicu srpskog naroda, Belgrade, 1950.
- Polivjannij, Dmitrij, "K istorii Vidinskogo despotstva v XIV veka," Bălgarsko srednovekovie (Fs Ivan Dujčev), Sofia, 1980: 94-98.
- Popov, Tenčo, Studii vǎrhu bǎlgarskoto srednovekovno monetosečene s izvodi za istorijata, Sofia, 2020.
