= Lodovico of Bulgaria =

Lodovico
- Emperor of Bulgaria (titular)
- Predecessor: Ivan Stephen?
- Born: before 1324
- Died: after 1363
- Spouse: Maria of Taranto
- House: Šišman
- Father: Michael Asen III "Šišman"
- Mother: Ana of Serbia

Lodovico (as attested in Italian sources; Latin Ludovicus; Bulgarian: Людовик, Ljudovik) was a son of Emperor (tsar) Michael Asen III "Šišman" of Bulgaria (1323–1330) and his first wife, Ana, daughter of King Stefan Uroš II Milutin of Serbia by Elizabeth of Hungary. He may have borne a different name before becoming a catechumen and converting to Catholic Christianity. Although he has been variously identified with any of his three known brothers, Ivan Stephen, Šišman, and Michael, but was probably a distinct person. Recent research has established he is definitely distinct from Ivan Stephen.

== Early life ==
Lodovico's father Michael Asen III, already semi-autonomous ruler of Vidin, came to the Bulgarian throne in 1323. He quickly divorced Lodovico's mother Ana to marry the Byzantine princess Theodora Palaiologina, the widow of the earlier Bulgarian emperor Theodore Svetoslav, in 1324. As a younger son of his parents, Lodovico was accordingly born sometime before 1324.

Ana and her sons were removed from court until Michael Asen III's death at the battle of Velbazhd in 1330. The victor, Ana's brother Stefan Uroš III Dečanski of Serbia, came to terms with the Bulgarian nobles, and made her eldest surviving son Ivan Stephen emperor of Bulgaria (1330–1331). Ana and Ivan Stephen, presumably alongside her other sons including Lodovico, were installed at the capital Tărnovo in August or September 1330.

Opposition to the new regime led to a palace coup in March 1331, which brought Ivan Alexander (1331–1371), the son of Michael Asen III's sister, to the throne. Ana and Ivan Stephen, apparently with Lodovico, fled first to Serbia and then to Dubrovnik. Another son, the despotes Michael, was presumably no longer living, and may have died before 1330. For unknown reasons, another son, Šišman, fled to the "Scythians," presumably meaning the Mongol Golden Horde, before turning up at Constantinople in and causing a Bulgaro-Byzantine diplomatic crisis in 1341.

== In Italy ==
By 18 December 1338, Lodovico had arrived in the Kingdom of Naples, where King Robert granted a monthly stipend to him, his "dearest nephew" and "son of the great emperor of Bulgaria" (spectabili Lodoyco filio incliti imperatoris Bulgariae nepoti nostro carissimo). King Robert and Lodovico's mother Ana were first cousins, as children of the sisters Maria and Elizabeth of Hungary.

In about 1342, Lodovico married Maria of Taranto, an illegitimate daughter of the Prince of Taranto and titular Latin Emperor Philip I, as indicated in a letter of her half-brother, King Louis I of Naples to Pope Innocent VI written in 1357. As explicitly stated in the letters of King Louis, by 1357 Lodovico had succeeded his older brother (presumably Ivan Stephen or possibly another older brother, such as Shishman) as titular emperor of Bulgaria, and was accordingly titled "emperor of Bulgaria" (e.g., generosus vir Ludovicus Imperator Bulgariae carissumus consanguineus noster) by his Neapolitan relatives. King Louis also informed the Pope that Lodovico, as well as his mother (Ana) and older brother (Ivan Stephen?), had already converted to Catholic Christianity. The precise dates for these events within the period 1339–1357 remain unclear, but a letter of Queen Joanna I of Naples from 9 August 1343 refers to Lodovico's mother Ana and her sons (et filiorum ejus) at Dubrovnik, which is possibly an indication that Ivan Stephen was still alive at that time. According to the second letter of King Louis (from 1362?), at the time of his succession to the titular emperorship of Bulgaria, Lodovico is said to have been a prisoner of war of "the possessor of the Constantinopolitan Empire," but the details remain obscure.

By 18 October 1361, Lodovico had been made judge of the vicariate court of the Kingdom of Naples (generoso & magnifico D. Ludouico Bulgariae Imperatore Curiam Vicaria regni regens). In November 1361 and January 1362, an agent of an unnamed emperor of Bulgaria who is likely Lodovico operated at the port of Barletta, according to Ragusan sources. The last known attestation of Lodovico is from 7 October 1363, when an unnamed emperor of Bulgaria was taken prisoner by Siena at the battle of Guardavalle. In unknown circumstances, Lodovico had become involved with the mercenary "Hat Company," which rebelled against the city of Florence when it refused to double the wages of the mercenaries, and plundered the environs of Siena until decisively defeated by the Sienese at Guardavalle. In one instance, the Sienese sources mention as captives both the "emperor of Bulgaria" and a "bishop of Bulgaria" (captus fuit ... et imperator de Bolgaria et episcopus de Bolgaria, qui erant cum eis). Although the Sienese sources indicate the prisoners were held for six months and seven days, the subsequent fate of Lodovico is unknown, and he might not have survived the captivity.

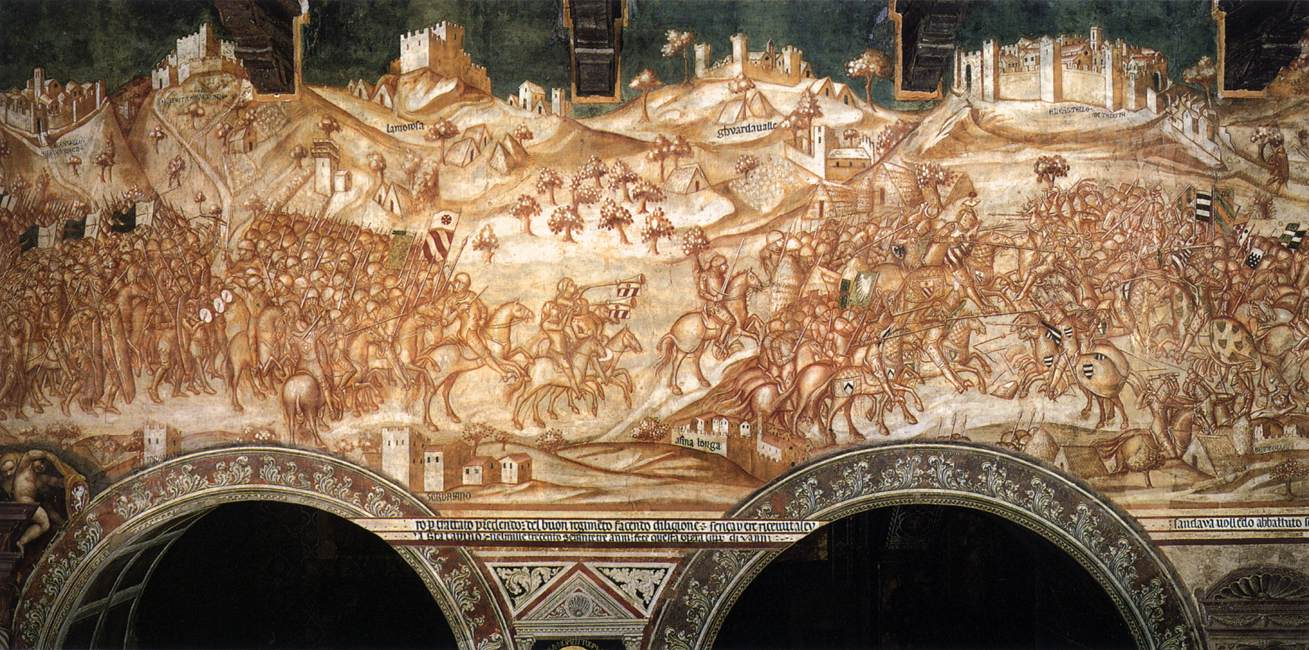
Lippo Vanni, the Sienese victory at Guardavalle/Val di Chiana, 1363, Palazzo Pubblico, Siena.

== Conflation and Identification ==
Early modern Ragusan historians including Giacomo Luccari, Mauro Orbini, and Giunio Resti, conflated Lodovico, whom they do not know by that name, with his brothers Ivan Stephen and Šišman, as well as with an impostor, Nicholas Zap(p)in(n)a, producing a confused narrative that has had a long-lasting misleading effect on modern historiography. This was the result of combining probable local traditions with imperfectly understood and synchronized evidence from Greek and Italian sources. Generally speaking, these narratives imagined Šišman (rather than Ivan Stephen) as his father's successor, who sought refuge in Dubrovnik, where he either died and was impersonated by the impostor Nicholas Zap(p)in(n)a or else assumed that name for security reasons; the real or impersonated prince entered Neapolitan service, involved himself in the struggles between the Neapolitans and Albanians over Durazzo, and was finally murdered while attempting to assert himself in Bulgaria with Turkish help in 1372 or 1373.

The eminent French historian Charles de Fresne Du Cange corrected some of the mistakes of the Ragusan writers and identified the Bulgarian prince in Italian sources as the emperor Lodovico attested as judge of the vicariate court in 1361 and as brother-in-law of King Louis I of Naples, but assumed this to be the Catholic name of Šišman, whom he imagined to have come to Naples after his stay at Constantinople in 1341. Du Cange was ambiguous on whether the Bulgarian prince was genuine or impersonated by Nicholas Zap(p)in(n)a, but credited him with adventures ascribed to the latter around Durazzo and in Bulgaria. Du Cange, however, was unaware of the documents already placing Lodovico, under that name, at Naples in 1338.

The Ragusan tradition, as improved and rationalized by Du Cange, has had a long afterlife in scholarship, influencing a number of modern works. Recognizing, like Du Cange, that Lodovico is probably a secondary, Catholic name assumed by a Bulgarian prince in exile, scholars have proposed various identifications with the other known sons of Michael Asen III and Ana of Serbia. Du Cange's identification of Lodovico with Šišman is contradicted by the chronological indicators of more recently recognized sources, Burmov's identification of Lodovico with the despotes Michael is unlikely, as the latter was probably dead by 1330. Jireček and Nikolov-Zikov's identification of Lodovico with Ivan Stephen is contradicted by the chronological indicators of the sources and the express testimony of King Louis I of Naples. Accordingly, Lodovico is best considered a distinct son of Michael Asen III and Ana of Serbia.

== Sources ==
- Andreev, Jordan, et al., Koj koj e v srednovekovna Bălgarija, 3rd ed., Sofia, 2012.
- Barlieva, Slavia, "An "Emperor of Bulgaria" in Siena in 1363," Bulgaria Mediaevalis 12 (2021) 13-18. online
- Burmov, Aleksandăr, Istorija na Bălgarija prez vremeto na Šišmanovci (1323–1396 g.), in Izbrani proizvedenija 1, Sofia, 1968: 220-281.
- Božilov, Ivan, Familijata na Asenevci (1186–1460), Sofia, 1985.
- Božilov, Ivan, and Vasil Gjuzelev, Istorija na srednovekovna Bǎlgarija VII-XIV vek, Sofia, 2006.
- Du Cange, Charles de Fresne, Histoire de l’empire de Constantinople sous les empereurs françois 2, Paris, 1657.
- Fine, John Van Antwerp, The Late Medieval Balkans: A Critical Survey from the Late Twelfth Century to the Ottoman Conquest, Ann Arbor, 1987.
- Jireček, Konstantin, Geschichte der Bulgaren, Prague, 1876.
- Jireček, Konstantin, Geschichte der Serben 1, Gotha, 1911.
- Mladjov, Ian, "The Bulgarian Prince and would-be Emperor Lodovico," Bulgaria Mеdiaevalis 2 (2011), 603–618. online
- Nikolov-Zikov, Petăr, Domăt na Šišman, Sofia, 2021.
- Popov, Tenčo, Studii vǎrhu bǎlgarskoto srednovekovno monetosečene s izvodi za istorijata, Sofia, 2020.
- Schwennicke, Detlev, Europäische Stammtafeln, Band II, Marburg, 1984.
