= Shishman (son of Michael Shishman) =

- Born: unknown
- Died: after 1341
- House: Shishman
- Father: Michael Asen III "Shishman"
- Mother: Ana of Serbia

Shishman (Bulgarian: Шишман, Šišman) was a son of Emperor (tsar) Michael Asen III "Shishman" of Bulgaria (1323–1330) and his first wife, Ana, daughter of King Stefan Uroš II Milutin of Serbia by Elizabeth of Hungary. He was named after his grandfather Shishman of Vidin. The place and date of his birth are unknown.

== Early life ==
Shishman's father Michael Asen III, already semi-autonomous ruler of Vidin, came to the Bulgarian throne in 1323. He quickly divorced Shishman's mother Ana to marry the Byzantine princess Theodora Palaiologina, the widow of the earlier Bulgarian emperor Theodore Svetoslav, in 1324. Ana and her sons were removed from court until Michael Asen III's death at the battle of Velbazhd in 1330. The victor, Ana's brother Stefan Uroš III Dečanski of Serbia, came to terms with the Bulgarian nobles, and made her eldest surviving son Ivan Stephen emperor of Bulgaria (1330–1331). Ana and Ivan Stephen, presumably alongside her other sons including Shishman, were installed at the capital Tărnovo in August or September 1330.

Opposition to the new regime led to a palace coup in March 1331, which brought Ivan Alexander (1331–1371), the son of Michael Asen III's sister, to the throne. Ana and Ivan Stephen fled first to Serbia and then to Dubrovnik. For unknown reasons, Shishman was not with them, but fled to the "Scythians," presumably meaning the Mongol Golden Horde, where he remained for another decade.

== In the Byzantine Empire ==
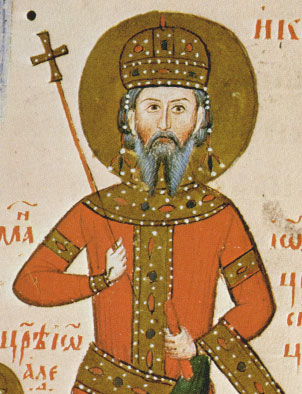
A miniature of Ivan Alexander.

Following the death of the Byzantine emperor Andronikos III Palaiologos in June 1341, Shishman arrived at Constantinople. Hearing of this, Ivan Alexander sent envoys to Constantinople, demanding that the Byzantine government extradite Shishman, whom he described as "his greatest enemy," citing existing treaty obligations and threatening war. The regent and future emperor John Kantakouzenos responded by convening a meeting of the senate, under the presidency of Patriarch John XIV Kalekas, to discuss the matter. The discussion failed to yield a consensus, and the Patriarch suggested that Shishman should seek refuge in Hagia Sophia. At a subsequent meeting of the senate, the Bulgarian envoys behaved insolently, and the empress Anna of Savoy instructed John Kantakouzenos to respond. He stated that it was not appropriate for the emperor to surrender refugees to their enemies, and that unless Ivan Alexander gave up his demands and maintained the peace, the Byzantines would bring Shishman by ship up the Danube to Vidin and cause a civil war in Bulgaria, or John Kantakouzenos himself would invade Bulgaria by land with Shishman in tow.

While the Bulgarian envoys returned to Ivan Alexander with a month's term to continue negotiations, John Kantakouzenos prepared for military action and dispatched his Turkish ally Umur of Aydın with his fleet to the mouth of the Danube. Ivan Alexander likewise prepared for war, but encamped with his army in the neighborhood of Sliven, north of the border between Bulgaria and the Byzantine Empire. Following the renewal of negotiations, Ivan Alexander gave up his demands and renewed the peace agreements. Shishman's subsequent fate remains unknown. It is possible that Shishman is the "emperor Shishman" (basileus Sousmanos) whose bastard son would become Patriarch Joseph II of Constantinople. If that is so, and if the Patriarch was born in 1360, this might imply that Shishman remained in the Byzantine Empire and survived at least until that date. Alternatively, the "emperor Shishman" would be Ivan Shishman of Bulgaria, although he would seem to have been too young to father Patriarch Joseph II if current assumptions are correct.

== Conflation and fictional epilogue ==
Early modern Ragusan historians including Giacomo Luccari, Mauro Orbini, and Giunio Resti, conflated Shishman with his brothers Ivan Stephen and Lodovico, as well as an impostor, Nicholas Zap(p)in(n)a, producing a confused narrative that has had a long-lasting misleading effect on modern historiography. This was the result of combining probable local traditions with imperfectly understood and synchronized evidence from Greek and Italian sources. Generally speaking, these narratives imagined Shishman as his father's successor, who sought refuge in Dubrovnik, where he either died and was impersonated by the impostor Nicholas Zap(p)in(n)a or assumed that name; the real or impersonated prince entered Neapolitan service, involved himself in the struggles between the Neapolitans and Albanians over Durazzo, and was finally murdered while attempting to assert himself in Bulgaria with Turkish help in 1372 or 1373. None of these events correspond with the known facts of Shishman's life.

== Sources ==
- Andreev, Jordan, et al., Koj koj e v srednovekovna Bălgarija, 3rd ed., Sofia, 2012.
- Božilov, Ivan, Familijata na Asenevci (1186–1460), Sofia, 1985.
- Božilov, Ivan, and Vasil Gjuzelev, Istorija na srednovekovna Bǎlgarija VII-XIV vek, Sofia, 2006.
- Fine, John Van Antwerp (1994). The Late Medieval Balkans: A Critical Survey from the Late Twelfth Century to the Ottoman Conquest. University of Michigan Press. ISBN 978-0-472-08260-5.
- Mladjov, Ian, "The Bulgarian Prince and would-be Emperor Lodovico," Bulgaria Mеdiaevalis 2 (2011), 603–618.
- Nikolov-Zikov, Petăr, Domăt na Šišman, Sofia, 2021.
- Schwennicke, Detlev, Europäische Stammtafeln, Band II (1984).
