= Church of the Holy Mother of God, Donja Kamenica =

Coordinates: 43°29′13.48″N 22°19′37.19″E

Church of the Holy Mother of God
- Црква Свeте Богородице; Църква „Света Богородица“
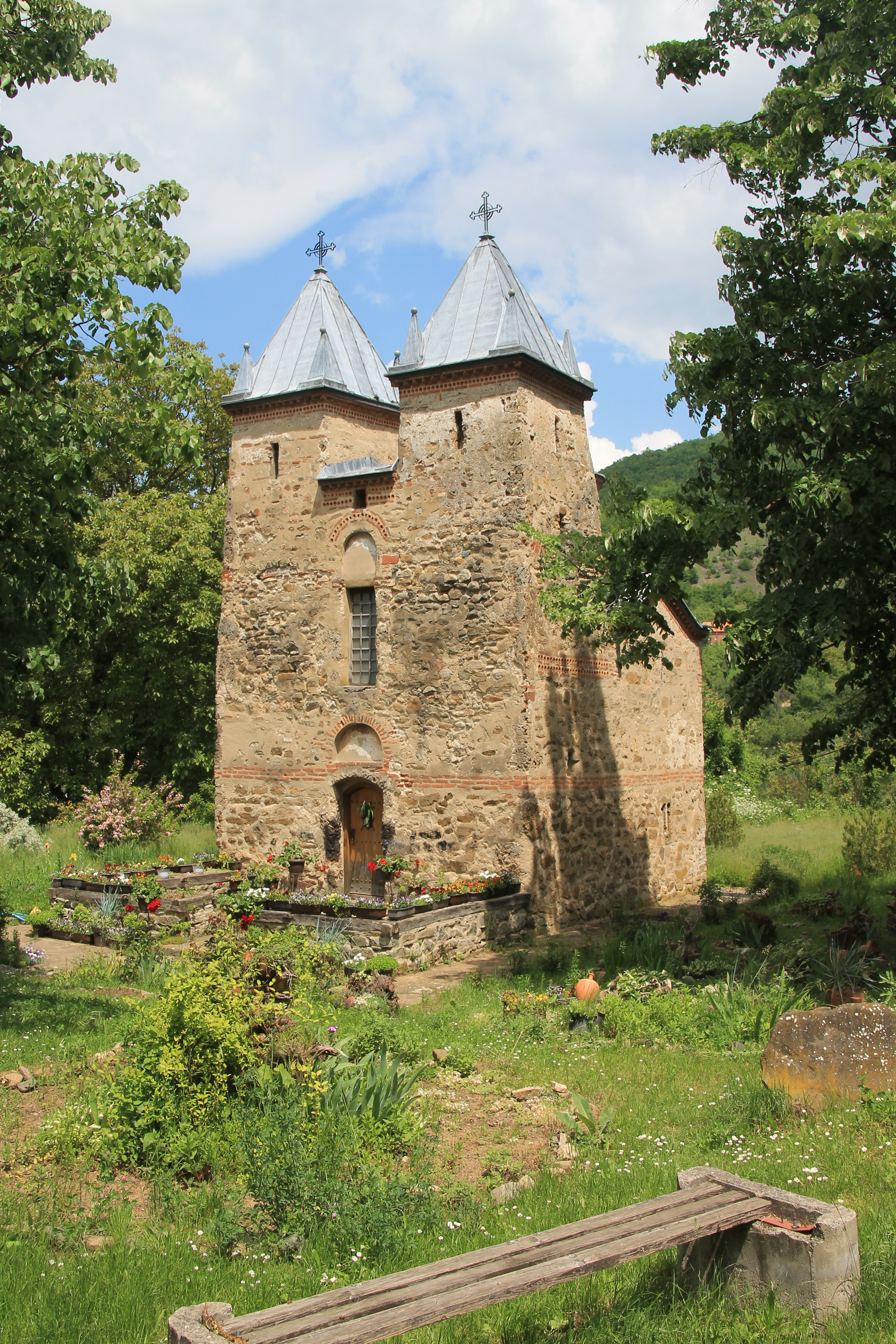
- The 14th-century Church of the Holy Mother of God in Donja Kamenica

- Location within Serbia
- Location: Donja Kamenica, 10 to 15 kilometres (6.2 to 9.3 mi) southeast of Knjaževac, Serbia
- Denomination: Serbian Orthodox
- Previous denomination: Bulgarian Orthodox

History
- Dedication: Holy Mother of God

Architecture
- Functional status: active
- Style: Byzantine with Hungarian or Transylvanian influences
- Completed: early 14th century

The Church of the Holy Mother of God (Serbian: Црква Свeте Богородице / Crkva Svete Bogorodice; Bulgarian: Църква „Света Богородица“, Tsarkva „Sveta Bogoroditsa“) is a medieval Eastern Orthodox church in the village of Donja Kamenica in Knjaževac Municipality, Zaječar District, eastern Serbia. The church is generally considered to have been built in the 14th century, though alternative datings have been proposed.

While small, the Church of the Holy Mother of God is notable for its unusual architectural style, in particular for its high narthex flanked by two sharp-pointed towers. These features, which hint at Hungarian or Transylvanian influences, are highly atypical for medieval Bulgarian church architecture. The church is richly decorated on the inside, with as many as eleven frescoes of historical figures. One of these portraits, captioned as a despot, is variously identified as an eponymous son of Bulgarian tsar Michael Shishman or as an undocumented son of co-tsar Michael Asen IV; earlier speculation that the image depicted Serbian noble Mihailo Anđelović or Michael Shishman himself have since fallen out of favor with art historians. In addition to these early portraits, the interior walls of the church were painted with canonical murals, which can stylistically be assigned to the 14th–15th century. The church was reconstructed in 1958 and has been under Serbian state protection since 1982.

== History and architecture ==
The Church of the Holy Mother of God lies in the eastern Serbian village of Donja Kamenica, some 10 to 15 kilometres (6.2 to 9.3 mi) southeast of Knjaževac, northeast of Niš and not far from the Bulgarian border. The church is located at the square in the centre of the village, by the left bank of the Trgoviški Timok river and along an old military road from Pirot to Vidin. The church acquired its name due to its abundance of frescoes featuring Mary, the mother of Jesus.

The prevalent opinion is that the church was constructed and painted in the early 14th century, which coincides with the lifetimes of the individuals most widely accepted as represented by the figures depicted in the church's frescoes. At the time, the village of Donja Kamenica, along with much of the Timok Valley region, belonged to the Vidin appanage of the Second Bulgarian Empire. However, alternative theories place the construction of the church in the mid-14th century, the mid-15th century or even the 16th century. The church and its frescoes were restored in 1958. The church was declared a Monument of Culture of Great Importance in 1982, and it is protected by the Republic of Serbia.

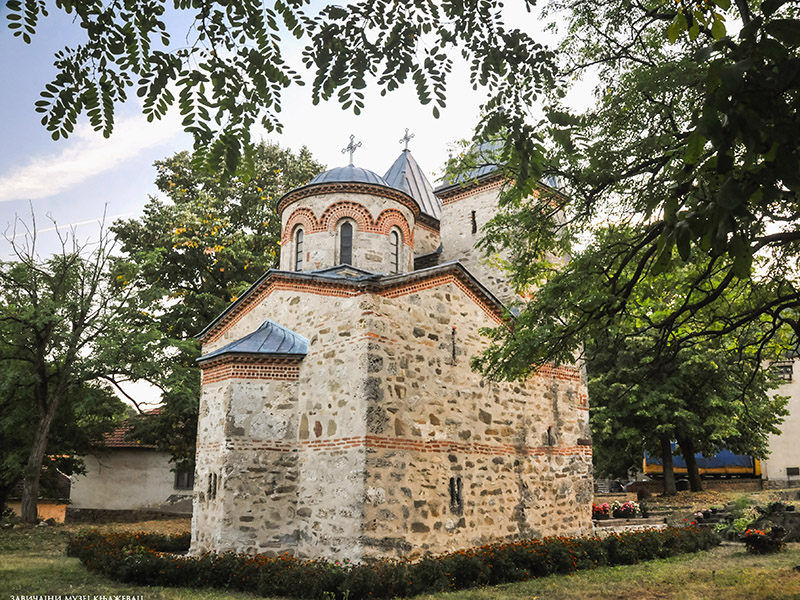
Backside

In terms of architecture, the church features a round dome and a single apse. The naos or cella has the shape of a cross, in line with the popular Byzantine cross-in-square design. Of particular interest is the formerly two-storey narthex, which is notable for its unusual verticality and the towers on either side of the entrance. Judging by the models depicted in the donor's portraits inside the church, it is clear that the towers were originally further apart and the west facade with the narthex included much woodwork. The towers are topped off by sharp-pointed pyramidal elements, with additional sharp-pointed details in each of the pyramids' four corners. The towers and their design are entirely unusual and unprecedented in medieval Bulgarian church architecture. Art historian Nikola Mavrodinov believes these resemble Gothic architecture, though a more modern researcher, Bistra Nikolova, dismisses his assessment and considers these an influence from Hungary or Transylvania.

Despite its monumental appearance, the church is rather small in size. It measures 7.80 by 6.50 metres (25.6 ft × 21.3 ft) (according to Nikolova) or 7.70 by 6.20 metres (25.3 ft × 20.3 ft) (per Mavrodinova). The materials employed in the church's construction were chiefly chiseled stones welded together using mortar masonry. Several rows of bricks were added in order to even out the structure and to serve as decoration, particularly in the dome, which features more elaborate brickwork.

== Decoration ==
The frescoes inside the church are commonly dated to the 14th–15th century, though they follow a standard compositional model which had been established in Bulgarian church decoration since the 13th century. Unusually, most of the captions which accompany the images are in Byzantine Greek, though a few are in Old Church Slavonic. In terms of style, the murals have much in common with churches from the southwestern Bulgarian lands.

Biblical scenes and figures depicted in the Church of the Holy Mother of God include the worshiping of the Christ child as the eucharistic victim (the Melismos) in the lower part of the apse, the raising of Lazarus, the Annunciation, Jesus' triumphal entry into Jerusalem, Judas Iscariot's betrayal of Jesus, the Passion of the Christ in the upper part of the cella, the Descent from the Cross, the mourning of Jesus, and the Dormition of the Theotokos on the west wall. The north and south walls of the cella, as well as the wall piers, bear frescoes of saints, including rare images of military saints on horseback. Murals of Saint Petka and Saint Nicholas were painted in the upper reaches of the narthex, in the south and the north tower respectively.

Besides religious imagery, the frescoes of the Donja Kamenica church also include eleven portraits of contemporary historical figures, separated into four compositions. Three of the compositions are uncaptioned, making the identification of the people practically impossible. The first composition is located in the cella and depicts two men preserved from the waist up, of which one holds a model of the church, and a child, of which only the head is visible today. The second composition was painted on the upper west wall of the narthex and portrays a man, a woman, a boy and a girl, with the man also holding a model of the church, a common symbol of donorship. Art historian Dragana Frfulanović believes that the images of men holding models in both compositions depict the same person, the main donor. The third composition is in the cella and depicts two men: a monk and a priest.

=== Despot and despotissa's portraits ===
Of greatest interest is the fourth composition of historical figures, a young man and a woman, which was painted on the lowest west wall of the narthex and includes inscriptions in Old Church Slavonic. The figures are painted facing the viewer. The man's red clothing is covered in pearls and double-headed eagles, and he wears an archaic-looking despot's crown on his head. In his right hand, the man holds a sceptre with a cross. He extends his hand to a woman, clad in a despotissa's attire and wearing a fitting crown.

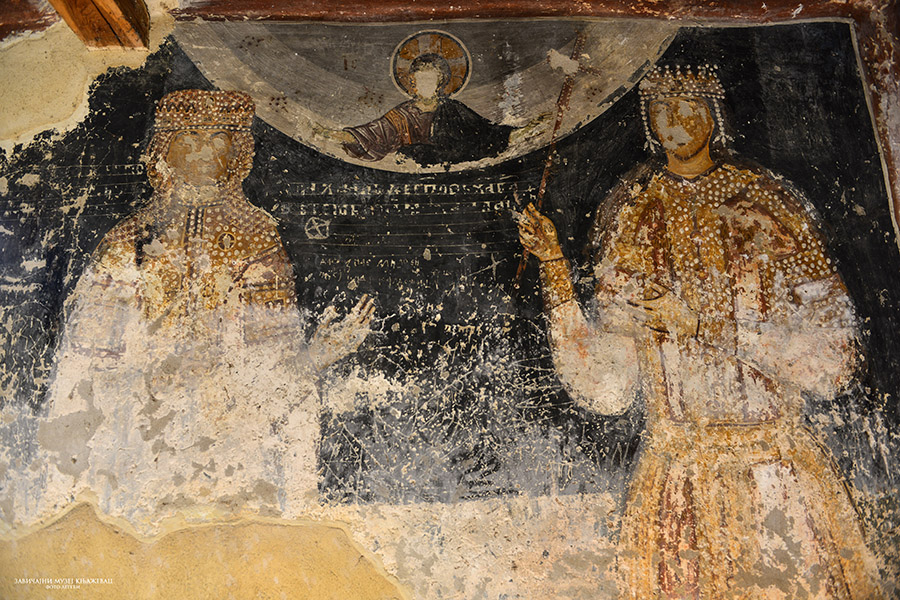
Fourth fresco composition

The inscription next to the figure of the man has been deciphered either as “Michael despot, in Christ [our] God... faithful” or “Michael despot, in Christ [our] God faithful, son of Tsar Michael”. Either reading presents significant challenges as to the proper identification of the portrayed person, who was clearly a despot, bore the name Michael, and, if the latter reading is correct, was the son of an eponymous tsar. As a result, various theories have been proposed by Bulgarian and Serbian researchers alike.

Early Bulgarian historian Petar Nikov suggested that despot Michael of the Donja Kamenica church is identical with Bulgarian tsar Michael Shishman (r. 1323–1330) who, before his accession to the throne, was despot of Vidin. However, Michael Shishman's father was named Shishman, not Michael, and was usually titled despot rather than tsar. In turn, Mavrodinov proposed the theory that despot Michael is an otherwise unknown son of Michael Shishman, who was installed as despot of Vidin by his father after his coronation in 1323. In any case, this unknown son of Michael Shishman was probably dead by 1331 because Belaur is mentioned as the ruler of Vidin shortly thereafter. The latter theory is the most established identification of despot Michael in Bulgarian historiography.

A third theory, supported by both Serbian and Bulgarian researchers, is that despot Michael is an unknown son of Michael Asen IV, the first-born son of Bulgarian tsar Ivan Alexander (r. 1331–1371), who was proclaimed co-tsar shortly after his father's accession and died in a battle against the Ottomans before 1354–1355. Against this identification is the account of Nikephoros Gregoras, who mentions that Michael Asen's widow returned childless to Constantinople after his death. Another issue with this theory is that no source mentions Michael Asen as a despot.

Another theory, which was put forward by early Serbian historians and has subsequently lost support in Serbian scholarship, is that despot Michael is to be identified with mid-15th-century Serbian noble Mihailo Anđelović, a brother of Ottoman statesman Mahmud Pasha Angelović. However, in-depth research of the frescoes has concluded that they cannot be ascribed to the 1450s, as the artistic style, the clothing and hairstyles in the portraits are uncommon for this period. Furthermore, the church seems to bear little architectural similarity to churches of the Morava school, which dominated 15th-century Serbian architecture. It has also been revealed that in 1454–1455, Donja Kamenica was controlled by the Ottomans and in possession of a certain Yusuf, rather than part of the Serbian Despotate, and Mihailo Anđelović was never titled despot.

The identity of the woman has also been a matter of debate. The inscription which accompanies her image clearly includes her title, despotissa, as well as the word “daughter”. Based on a possible reading of her name as Anna, she has been identified as Anna Neda, the Serbian wife of Michael Shishman, which is in line with the first identification of the despot. Nikolova believes that it is possible that the woman is Anna Neda even if the despot is her son rather than her husband. She theorises that Anna Neda settled in Vidin after Michael Shishman's second marriage and owned a personal domain which included Donja Kamenica. Another reading of the inscription deciphers the name of the despotissa as Elena.

== See also ==
- Monuments of Culture of Great Importance
