= Treaty of Chernomen =

1327 treaty between Bulgarian and Byzantine empires

The Treaty of Chernomen (Bulgarian: Черноменски договор) was a treaty between the Bulgarian Empire and the Byzantine Empire signed on 13 May 1327 by Michael Shishman and Andronikos III Palaiologos. The treaty was followed by several other agreements.

== Background ==
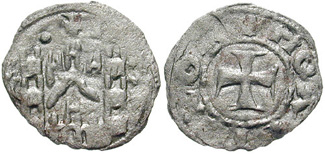
Coin of Andronikos III.

In the beginning of 1327 Bulgaria became involved in the third and final stage of the Byzantine civil war of 1321–1328 between Andronikos II and his grandson Andronikos III. Despite the inconsistent Serbian policy in his assistance, the old emperor managed to negotiate the support of the Serbian king Stephen Dečanski which urged Andronikos III to tighten his relations with the Emperor of Bulgaria. Michael Shishman, who fought against Andronikos III three years earlier, was interested to help because he was in strained relations with Serbia after his divorce with Anna Neda and was disturbed by the marriage of Stephen Dečanski to the cousin of the old emperor Maria Palaiologina.

== Treaty ==
Michael Shishman and Andronikos III met at Chernomen on the Byzantine–Bulgarian border in May 1327. Since the negotiations were supposed to be secret, they used for pretext the desire of the Byzantine empress Rita of Armenia to meet her daughter Maria Palaiologina, whom she had not seen for 23 years and Andronikos III was allegedly anxious to see his sister as well. John Kantakouzenos, who was present during the negotiations, intentionally concealed their real purpose and described them as a private meeting between relatives and only writes about eight days of rejoicing and feasts.

However, during these eight days the emperors met several times in private or officially with their delegations. Eventually they reached an agreement for mutual help against their enemies. Michael Shishman had to provide assistance against Andronikos II, while the young emperor was obliged to help Michael Shishman against the King of Serbia. It was also agreed that in case Andronikos III became sole emperor, he was to cede to Bulgaria several border territories and a large amount of money as dowry. The treaty was signed without major obstacles as both sides had clear interest of the alliance — Michael Shishman wanted a reconquest of Macedonia, while Andronikos III was preparing for the final confrontation with his grandfather.

== Aftermath ==
Backed on the treaty, when hostilities were resumed in the autumn of 1327, Andronikos III was able to quickly submit Macedonia and in January 1328 captured Salonika, the second most important city in the Byzantine Empire. Surprised by the quick victory of his ally, Michael Shishman offered help to Andronikos II in return of the surrender of all border lands and money. He sent 3,000 horsemen under the command of Ivan the Russian to guard him, but his real intention was to capture the old emperor and Constantinople. After the interference of Andronikos III, however, the plot failed and the Bulgarian detachment returned home.

After several showdown campaigns without field battles and mutual accusations for not respecting the Treaty of Chernomen, Michael Shishman and Andronikos III renegotiated peace in October 1328. The Bulgarians agreed not to take territory and were awarded large amount of money. As the relations between Bulgaria and Serbia were deteriorating and the two countries were on the course of war, Michael Shishman and Andronikos III organised a final meeting at Krimni between Sozopol and Anchialos in the beginning of 1329 and agreed to a "lasting peace and eternal alliance". They agreed to attack Serbia, but the Bulgarian army was defeated in the Battle of Velbazhd on 28 July 1330 and Michael Shishman was mortally wounded and died. When the news of the disaster reached Andronikos III, he abandoned the campaign against Serbia and turned on Bulgaria, but suffered a defeat at Rusokastro.

== Footnotes ==
=== Notes ===
a: The contemporary Byzantine sources display some contradictions concerning the treaty. John Kantakouzenos gives Chernomen as the site of the meeting, while according to Nicephorus Gregoras it was held at Dimotika. It is generally accepted that the place was Chernomen because Kantakouzenos was very close to Andronikos III and must have been better informed. The two also do not explicitly mention the date but it was mentioned in another chronicle.

== Sources ==
=== References ===
- Andreev, Jordan; Milcho Lalkov (1996). The Bulgarian Khans and Tsars (in Bulgarian). Veliko Tarnovo: Abagar. ISBN 954-427-216-X.
- Bozhilov, Ivan; Vasil Gyuzelev (1999). History of Medieval Bulgaria 7th-14th Centuries (in Bulgarian). Sofia: Anubis. ISBN 954-426-204-0.
- Fine, J. (1987). The Late Medieval Balkans, A Critical Survey from the Late Twelfth Century to the Ottoman Conquest. The University of Michigan Press. ISBN 0-472-10079-3.
- Greek Sources for Bulgarian History (GIBI), volume X (in Bulgarian and Greek). Sofia: Izdatelstvo na BAN. 1980.
