= House of Shishman =

Bulgarian aristocratic dynasty of Cuman origin

House of Shishman Шишмановци
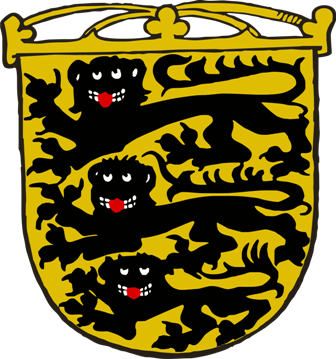
- Coat of arms of the Bulgarian emperor, drawn by Conrad Grünenberg (1483)
- Parent house: Asen dynasty (matrilineal)
- Country: Second Bulgarian Empire
- Founded: 1270s/1280s
- Founder: Shishman of Vidin
- Final ruler: Ivan Stephen
- Titles: Emperor of Bulgaria; Despot of Vidin
- Dissolution: c. 15 century
- Deposition: 1331
- Cadet branches: House of Sratsimir (matrilineal)

The House of Shishman (Bulgarian: Шишман), also referred to as the Shishmanids or Shishmanovtsi (Bulgarian: Шишмановци), was a medieval Bulgarian dynasty of Turkic Cuman origin. The House of Shishman ruled the Second Bulgarian Empire from the proclamation of Michael Asen III as emperor in 1323 to the deposition of his son Ivan Stephen in 1331 whereafter rule fell to the House of Sratsimir, who were matrilineal descendants of the Shishmanids.

The Shishmanids were matrilineally descended from the earlier Asen dynasty and may also have been related to the immediately preceding Terter dynasty.

== Family tree ==
- Shishman of Vidin, Despot of Vidin
  - Michael Asen III, Bulgarian emperor (1323–1330; also known as Michael Shishman)
    - Ivan Stephen, Bulgarian emperor (1330–1331)
    - Shishman, exile in the Byzantine Empire
    - Louis, exile in Naples
    - Michael, Despot
  - Belaur, Despot of Vidin
  - Keratsa Petritsa, Empress of Bulgaria, married Sratsimir and was the mother of Ivan Alexander
    - (→ Sratsimir dynasty)
