= Ivan the Russian =

Bulgarian military leader

- Military career
- Allegiance: Second Bulgarian Empire
- Rank: protostrator

Ivan the Russian (Bulgarian: Иван Русина, romanized: Ivan Rusina; Hungarian: Orosz Iván; fl. 1288/1323–1332) was a 14th-century Bulgarian military leader of Russian origin who served Bulgarian tsars Michael Shishman and Ivan Alexander. Prior to joining the armed forces of the Second Bulgarian Empire, Ivan the Russian may have been a military commander in the service of the Hungarian governor of Severin.

Ivan the Russian rose to a high rank in the Bulgarian military in the wake of the accession of Michael Shishman to the throne. In 1323, he was in charge of the Bulgarian defence of Plovdiv during the prolonged and ultimately successful Byzantine siege of the city. In 1328, he was involved in a failed Bulgarian attempt to capture the Byzantine capital Constantinople from within. Probably taking part in the turbulent events that surrounded and followed Michael Shishman's death, Ivan the Russian was last mentioned as a representative of Ivan Alexander in 1332.

== Early years and siege of Plovdiv ==
Bulgarian historian Plamen Pavlov conjectures that Ivan the Russian was a Ruthenian born in the Kingdom of Galicia–Volhynia (centred on modern western Ukraine), a hypothesis based only on his ties to Hungary, the western neighbour of Galicia–Volhynia. Hungarian sources from 1288 make notice of one Russian named Ivan (Iwan dicto Oroz) as an ally of the ban of Severin, Theodore Vejtehi from the kindred Csanád, who was one of the nobles that opposed the rule of Charles I of Hungary in 1316–1317. The land to the south of Severin was governed for Bulgaria by the despot of Vidin, Michael Shishman, a supporter of Vejtehi. Thus, as the Hungarian king established his authority over Severin and suppressed Vejtehi's rebellion, Ivan the Russian may have fled to Vidin and entered the service of Michael Shishman. Ivan is thought to have been joined, as a commander subordinate to the despot of Vidin, by his personal forces which consisted of Hungarians and, presumably, Russians.

While Hungarian scholar György Györffy supports the identification of Ivan the Russian as the Iwan dicto Oroz of Hungarian chronicles, historian István Vásáry points to the lack of clear evidence and the large time span between the two. Before that identification was proposed, it was considered that Ivan had arrived in Bulgaria after fleeing the Mongol conquest of Rus', much like another Russian in Bulgarian service, Jacob Svetoslav. Either way, in 1323 Ivan's right-hand man was a Hungarian named Inas.

Michael Shishman's accession to the Bulgarian throne in 1323 meant that Ivan the Russian assumed an elite rank in the Bulgarian military hierarchy. Pavlov theorizes that he became protostrator, a title borrowed from Byzantium. The title was held by the second-in-command of the army and was approximate to the Western marshal. In the same year, Ivan was dispatched to the city of Plovdiv (Philippopolis) which had been recently conquered by Bulgaria after decades of Byzantine rule. With a one-thousand-strong cavalry force of Alans, Bulgarians and possibly Hungarians and two thousand infantrymen, Ivan was to defend the city from Byzantine raids. In that task he was assisted by his deputy Inas and the Alan chieftains Itil and Temir. At the time, Ivan was already well-known even in Byzantium as a military commander.

The Bulgarian forces commanded by Ivan the Russian managed to withstand the four-month siege of Plovdiv undertaken by Andronikos III Palaiologos, claimant to the Byzantine throne, and his Bulgarian ally Voysil, despot of Kopsis. In their attempts to capture the city, the Byzantines employed German specialists to construct a siege machine, from which they fired with crossbows at the Bulgarian defenders. Despite the elaborate siege tactics, by the summer of 1323 the Bulgarians had not only retained the city, but also launched raids on nearby Byzantine-held fortresses in the Rhodope Mountains, such as Stenimachos (modern Asenovgrad) and Tsepina. Plovdiv was lost, however, to the Byzantines soon thereafter. As Ivan's forces were leaving the city to meet the Bulgarian garrison that was to replace them, the pro-Byzantine inhabitants of Plovdiv opened the city gates and let a covert Byzantine detachment in.

== Anti-Byzantine plot and later career ==
The loss of Plovdiv did not seem to have had a profound effect on Ivan's career, and he remained a royal favourite. In 1328, Ivan was tasked by Tsar Michael Shishman with the defence of the Great Palace of Constantinople, the residence of emperor Andronikos II Palaiologos. Andronikos II, facing imminent defeat at the hands of his grandson and co-emperor Andronikos III in a protracted civil war, was distrustful of his own guard, and had requested the assistance of Michael Shishman. The Bulgarian emperor sent Ivan the Russian along with 3,000 horsemen to Constantinople in aid. In the words of Byzantine historian Nikephoros Gregoras, the actual intentions of Michael Shishman were to use Ivan and his men as a Trojan Horse. In a suitable moment, the Bulgarian guard would arrest the emperor and take hold of the palace before allowing Michael Shishman with a large army and Tatar mercenaries into Constantinople.

In accordance with the plan, Ivan and his cavalry approached Constantinople while Michael Shishman waited in Yambol with his army. The plot was uncovered by the spies of Andronikos III. Fearing for his own imperial ambitions, he wrote to his rival and grandfather not to accept the Bulgarians into the capital. While Ivan stuck to the plan and signed an oath that he had come with peace to persuade the Byzantines, he promptly retreated to Bulgarian territory upon receiving that order from Michael Shishman.

Ivan's role in the final years of Tsar Michael Shishman's reign and the rule of Ivan Stephen is uncertain, as he is not mentioned in the sources pertaining to that period. His high-ranking position nevertheless leads Pavlov to conjecture that Ivan took part in the Battle of Velbazhd of 28 July 1330, a Serbian victory over Bulgaria that paved the way to the Serbian dominance of the Balkans in the mid-14th century. Michael Shishman was killed in the battle and succeeded by his son Ivan Stephen (1330–1331). Pavlov believes that Ivan the Russian was among the Bulgarian nobles that ousted the weak Ivan Stephen in 1331 and placed Ivan Alexander (1331–1371) on the throne. It is also probable that Ivan the Russian took part in the Bulgarian victory over Byzantium at Rusokastro in 1332 because he was last recorded as Ivan Alexander's representative in the peace negotiations that followed.

== Assessment ==
Ivan the Russian was held in high regard by John VI Kantakouzenos, writer and later Byzantine emperor who likely personally faced Ivan in battle. In his History, Kantakouzenos calls Ivan a man “skilled in strategy”. Kantakouzenos also referred to Ivan as “one of Bulgaria's illustrious people” in his writings. Czech historian Konstantin Josef Jireček, a prominent researcher of Bulgarian history, assesses Ivan as “the most clear-cut figure of a Bulgarian military leader” of that age. In the eyes of Pavlov, despite his foreign origin Ivan the Russian was not considered an emigrant or a mercenary by the Bulgarian nobility and the emperor, but rather a trusted commander and one of their own.

== Sources ==
- Jireček, Konstantin (1977). Geschichte der Bulgaren (in German). Textor Verlag. ISBN 978-3-938402-11-5.
- Vásáry, István (2005). "The Tatars fade away from Bulgaria and Byzantium, 1320–1354". Cumans and Tatars: Oriental military in the pre-Ottoman Balkans, 1185–1365. Cambridge University Press. ISBN 978-0-521-83756-9.
- "Иван Русина (началото на 14 в.)". Българска енциклопедия А–Я (CD) (in Bulgarian). БАН, Труд, Сирма. 2002. ISBN 954-8104-08-3. OCLC 163361648.
- Бакалов, Георги; Милен Куманов (2003). Електронно издание "История на България" (CD) (in Bulgarian). София: Труд, Сирма. ISBN 954528613X.
- Иречек, Константин (1978). Петър Хр. Петров (ed.). История на българите (in Bulgarian). Наука и изкуство. OCLC 66252579.
- Павлов, Пламен (2005). "Руски "бродници", политически бегълци и военачалници през XII–XIV в.". Бунтари и авантюристи в средновековна България (in Bulgarian). Варна: LiterNet. ISBN 954-304-152-0.
