= Ivan of Bulgaria =

Ivan of Bulgaria may refer to:

- Ivan Vladislav of Bulgaria, Bulgarian emperor (1015–18)
- Ivan Asen I of Bulgaria, Bulgarian emperor (1189–96)
- Ivan II or Kaloyan of Bulgaria, Bulgarian emperor (1197–1207)
- Ivan Asen II of Bulgaria, Bulgarian emperor (1218–41)
- Ivan Stephen of Bulgaria, Bulgarian emperor (1330–31)
- Ivan Alexander of Bulgaria, Bulgarian emperor (1331–71)
- Ivan Shishman of Bulgaria, Bulgarian emperor in Tarnovo (1371–95)
- Ivan Sratsimir of Bulgaria, Bulgarian emperor in Vidin (1356–96)
