= Lardea =

Coordinates: 42°40′18″N 26°43′48″E

Lardea Лардея
- Yambol Province, Bulgaria

Site information
- Condition: In ruins

Location

Site history
- Events: Byzantine–Bulgarian Wars; Bulgarian-Ottoman Wars

Lardea or Lardeya (Bulgarian: Лардея, Greek: Λαρδέα) is a ruined late Roman and medieval fortress, situated near the village of Lozenets in Straldzha Municipality, Yambol Province, south-eastern Bulgaria. In the Middle Ages, Lardea often changed hands between Bulgaria and Byzantium.

== History ==
Lardea was founded in the late 3rd or early 4th century. In 705, it was ceded to the Bulgarian Empire along with the Zagore area by the Byzantine Empire. After the Byzantine–Bulgarian Treaty of 815, its fortifications were reinforced. Lardea was conquered by the Byzantine Empire in the aftermath of the Rus' invasion of Bulgaria (967–971). In 1051 or 1052, Nikephoros Bryennios defeated a Pecheneg detachment near Lardea. According to Alexiad by Anna Komnene, the Byzantine emperor Alexios I Komnenos (r. 1081–1118) spent 40 days in the fortress during his war with the Pechenegs in 1088. In her account, Komnene describes the fortress as lying between Diampolis and Goloe.

Lardea was conquered by the re-established Bulgarian Empire in the late 12th century. In 1186, the Bulgarian and Cuman forces of the brothers Asen and Peter engaged the troops of Byzantine emperor Isaac II Angelos, who were retreating to the fortress of Lardea amidst an anti-Bulgarian campaign. The Bulgarian army employed its cavalry to weaken the Byzantine force before organizing a successful all-out attack. Forced to retreat, Isaac II Angelos abandoned his campaign and fled to Adrianople.

Lardea was captured by the Byzantines along with Ktenia in 1278 during the Uprising of Ivaylo. In 1304, emperor Theodore Svetoslav (r. 1300–1321) regained north-eastern Thrace including Lardea for Bulgaria. The fortress became part of the enlarged Despotate of Kran, which served as the appanage of Aldimir, a Bulgarian noble loyal to his nephew Theodore Svetoslav.

However, the fortress was lost once again during the interregnum after the premature death of Theodore Svetoslav's son George II Terter in 1322. It was recovered by the new emperor Michael Shishman (r. 1323–1330) in 1324. After another brief Byzantine occupation between 1330 and 1332, it was once again in Bulgarian hands in the aftermath of the Battle of Rusokastro on 18 July 1332. In 1373, the Ottomans captured the important city of Diampolis and the surrounding fortresses including Lardea.

== Sources ==
- Andreev, Jordan; Milcho Lalkov (1996). The Bulgarian Khans and Tsars (in Bulgarian). Veliko Tarnovo: Abagar. ISBN 954-427-216-X.
