= Lukarić =

Noble family of Republic of Ragusa

Lukarić Lukarević, Luchari, Luccari, Lucari
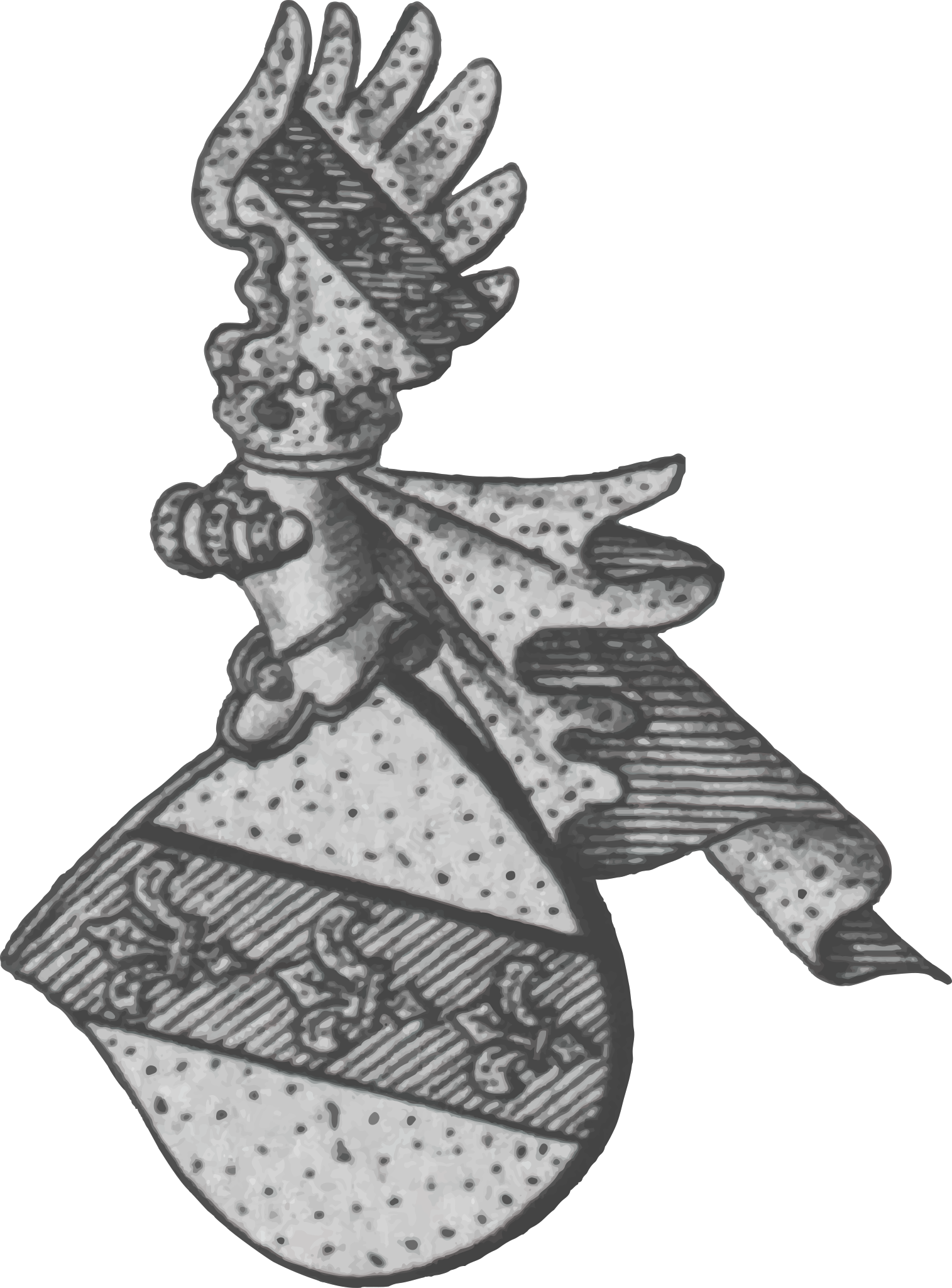
- Coat of arms of the Luccari as depicted in Friedrich Heyer von Rosenfeld's "Wappenbuch des Königreichs Dalmatien", published in 1873.
- Country: Republic of Venice, Republic of Ragusa
- Origin: Albania
- Founded: 1283
- Current head: extinct
- Dissolution: 1709 (in Ragusa)

The House of Lukarić or Lukarević (in Italian Luccari) was a noble family of the Republic of Ragusa.

== History ==
In 914, archival records document the migration of the Luccari, of Albanian origin, from Lezhë to Ragusa, with their roots traced back to Lasia di Slabia. Besides "Lukarić" the names of the long-extinct noble family included "Luccari" and "de Lucaris", found in Zadar in the year 1283. Šimun Lukarić probably belonged to another branch. Some of the Lukarić family names which occur in the Dalmatian nobility listings of 1553 in the city of Split, may belong to the family. The coats of arms (of both sexes) that are available do not permit this point to be determined.

== Notable Members ==
- Frano Lukarić (1541-1598), Ragusan poet
- Jakov Lukarević (1551-1615), historian, diplomat, politician and Rector of Ragusa (1613)
- Pietro Luccari (died 1679), bishop of Ston (1664-1679)
- Ivan Lukarić (1621-1709), writer

== See also ==
- Republic of Ragusa
- Dubrovnik
- Dalmatia
- Post-Roman patriciates

== Sources ==
- Heyer von Rosenfeld, Carl Georg Friedrich - "Der Adel des Königreichs Dalmatien", in Siebmacher Bd. IV / 3, Nürnberg 1873, Seite 55 (Tafel 36).
