= Petar Nikolov-Zikov =

Bulgarian political scientist and historian (born 1979)

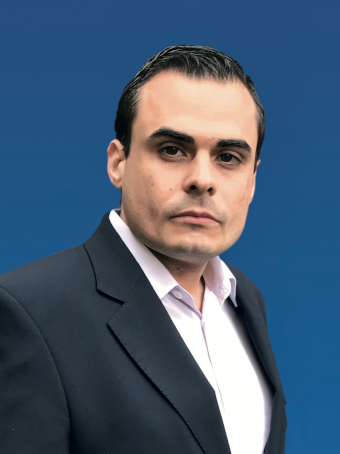
- Nikolov-Zikov in 2021

Deputy Minister of Education and Science
- Incumbent
- Assumed office May 2017
- Prime Minister: Boyko Borisov

Parliamentary secretary of the Council of Ministers
- In office November 2014 – January 2017
- Prime Minister: Boyko Borisov
- Preceded by: Veladin Bitolski
- Succeeded by: Lyubomila Stanislavova

Personal details
- Born: June 3, 1979 (age 47) Sofia, Bulgaria
- Party: СДС; Union of Democratic Forces
- Education: Sofia University
- Nickname: Petar Nikolov

Petar Nikolov-Zikov (Bulgarian: Петър Николов-Зиков; born June 3, 1979), known professionally as Petar Nikolov (Bulgarian: Петър Николов), is a Bulgarian political scientist, historian, politician, and associate professor at the New Bulgarian University (NBU). He serves as the Deputy Minister of Education and Science. A self-described conservative, Nikolov is a proponent of Christianity, patriotism, and capitalism.

== Biography ==
Petar Nikolov-Zikov was born on June 3, 1979, in Sofia to Nikolay Nikolov-Zikov. He graduated from the National School for Ancient Languages and Cultures in 1998. He went on to receive a bachelor's degree in political science at Sofia University in 2002, and a master's degree in political management in 2004. Nikolov has three daughters from his first marriage and a son from his second.

=== Professional career ===
Since 1999, Nikolov has published articles in newspapers such as Democracy, Pro and Anti, and Seven. In 2000, he joined the analysis department of the Union of Democratic Forces (SDS/UDF). After the UDF split in 2004, Nikolov became the head of the political bureau of Democrats for a Strong Bulgaria (DSB). From 2008 to 2009, he hosted a political TV show, Thursday Club.

Nikolov earned a PhD from the New Bulgarian University (NBU) in 2010. Since 2019, he has been an associate professor of political science at NBU and teaches undergraduate and graduate courses in the departments of political science and history and in other departments.

In 2011, Nikolov published his first book, The Birth of Bulgarian Conservatism. The following year, he published The House of Sratsimir, followed by his historical monograph The True Story of the Principality of Vidin. In 2017, Nikolov published Political Conservatism, co-written with his colleague from NBU, Dr. Irena Todorova. From 2015 to 2017, Petar Nikolov was the editor-in-chief of the academic magazine Conservative Quarterly. In 2019, he published his fifth book, The Bulgarian Monarchy.

=== Political career ===
Nikolov first ran for parliament in 2009, driving the DSB list in Lovech. Although he did not become an MP, the party's leader, Ivan Kostov, awarded him a seat on its national committee. He soon became Kostov's main spokesperson. Nikolov was the strategist for Proshko Proshkov's 2011 Sofia mayoral campaign. Proshkov won the DSB's internal elections and became the party nominee but subsequently lost to the sitting mayor. Due to internal conflicts, Nikolov and Proshkov left the party together with Daniel Mitov and Hristo Angelichin (future minister and deputy minister of foreign affairs), eventually all joining the Bulgaria for Citizens Movement (BCM) in 2012. With BCM in 2013, Nikolov ran another unsuccessful campaign for MP.

In 2014, Nikolov founded the Institute for Right-Wing Policy, which aimed to promote and facilitate the coalition between GERB and the Reformist Bloc. After the coalition was formed, Nikolov was appointed parliamentary secretary of the Council of Ministers by Prime Minister Boyko Borisov.

In 2017, Nikolov announced his intentions to run for parliament on behalf of the United Patriots. However, he did not win a seat in Bulgaria’s National Assembly, where parties and candidates must clear an electoral threshold to gain representation. Although his candidacy was initially promoted for the post of culture minister, during the formation of the coalition between GERB and the United Patriots, Nikolov was instead appointed Deputy Minister of Education and Science.

== Publications ==
- The Genesis of Bulgarian Conservatism. Paradigma. 2011. ISBN 978-954-326-137-6.
- The House of Sratsimir. New Bulgarian University. 2012. ISBN 978-954-535-702-2.
- The True Story of the Principality of Vidin. Ciela. 2014. ISBN 978-954-28-1445-0.
- The Political Conservatism. Ciela. 2017. ISBN 978-954-28-2240-0.
- The Bulgarian Monarchy I (632-765). A&T Publishers. 2019. ISBN 978-619-7430-25-7.
- The Bulgarian Monarchy II (765-893). A&T Publishers. 2020. ISBN 978-619-7106-53-4.

== Honours ==
- - Commander, pro Merito Melitensi (2019)
