= Michael Shishman of Bulgaria =

Tsar of Bulgaria from 1323 to 1330

Michael Shishman
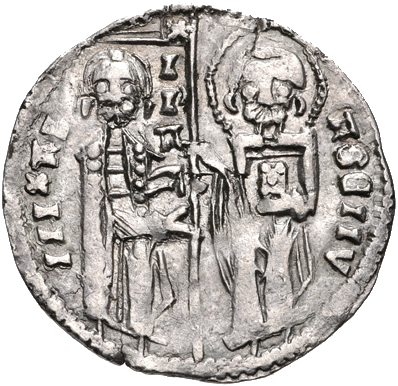
- Coin of Michael Shishman

Tsar of Bulgaria
- Reign: 1323–1330
- Predecessor: George II
- Successor: Ivan Stephen
- Born: after 1280
- Died: 31 July 1330; Velbazhd
- Burial: Church of St. George, Staro Nagoričane
- Spouse: Anna Neda; Theodora Palaiologina
- Issue: Ivan Stephen; Michael; Shishman; Lodovico
- House: Shishman dynasty
- Father: Shishman of Vidin
- Religion: Eastern Orthodoxy

Michael Asen III (Bulgarian: Михаил Асен III, romanized: Mihail Asen III), commonly known as Michael Shishman (Bulgarian: Михаил Шишман, romanized: Mihail Shishman), ruled as tsar of Bulgaria from 1323 to 1330. The exact year of his birth is unknown but it was between 1280 and 1292. He was the founder of the last ruling dynasty of the Second Bulgarian Empire, the Shishman dynasty. After he was crowned, however, Michael used the name Asen to emphasize his connection with the Asen dynasty, the first one to rule over the Second Empire.

An energetic and ambitious ruler, Michael Shishman led an aggressive but opportunistic and inconsistent foreign policy against the Byzantine Empire and the Kingdom of Serbia, which ended in the disastrous Battle of Velbazhd that claimed his own life. He was the last medieval Bulgarian ruler who aimed at the military and political hegemony of the Bulgarian Empire over the Balkans and the last one who attempted to seize Constantinople. He was succeeded by his son Ivan Stephen and later by his nephew Ivan Alexander, who reversed Michael Shishman's policy by forming an alliance with Serbia.

== Rise to the throne ==
Born between 1280 and 1292, Michael Shishman was the son of the despot Shishman of Vidin by an unnamed daughter of the sebastokrator Peter and a daughter of Ivan Asen II (r. 1218–1241) and Irene Komnene of Epirus. He was also a distant cousin of his predecessors on the Bulgarian throne, Theodore Svetoslav (r. 1300–1321) and George Terter II (r. 1321–1322). After the peace between his father and Stefan Milutin in 1292, Michael Shishman was engaged to Milutin's daughter Ana and they married in 1298 or 1299.

Since the middle of the 13th century, the area of Vidin had been autonomous under ineffective Bulgarian overlordship, and was ruled successively by Yakov Svetoslav (d. 1276), Shishman (died between 1308 and 1313), and then Michael Shishman. Shishman and his son received the high courtly title of despot from their cousin Theodore Svetoslav and the latter was referred to in a contemporary Venetian source as a Despot of Bulgaria and Lord of Vidin. With the death of the Serbian king Stefan Milutin, Michael Shishman was able to follow a more active policy in the Bulgarian capital Tarnovo. He soon became a leading noble in the internal affairs of the country and, on the childless death of young George Terter II in 1323, Michael Shishman was elected emperor of Bulgaria by the nobility. According to some historians, he was chosen because he was a descendant of the Asen dynasty and they interpret his accession to the throne not as the beginning of a new dynasty but rather as a continuation of the House of Asen. His half-brother, Belaur, succeeded him as despot of Vidin.

== Relations with the Byzantine Empire ==
=== War against Byzantium ===
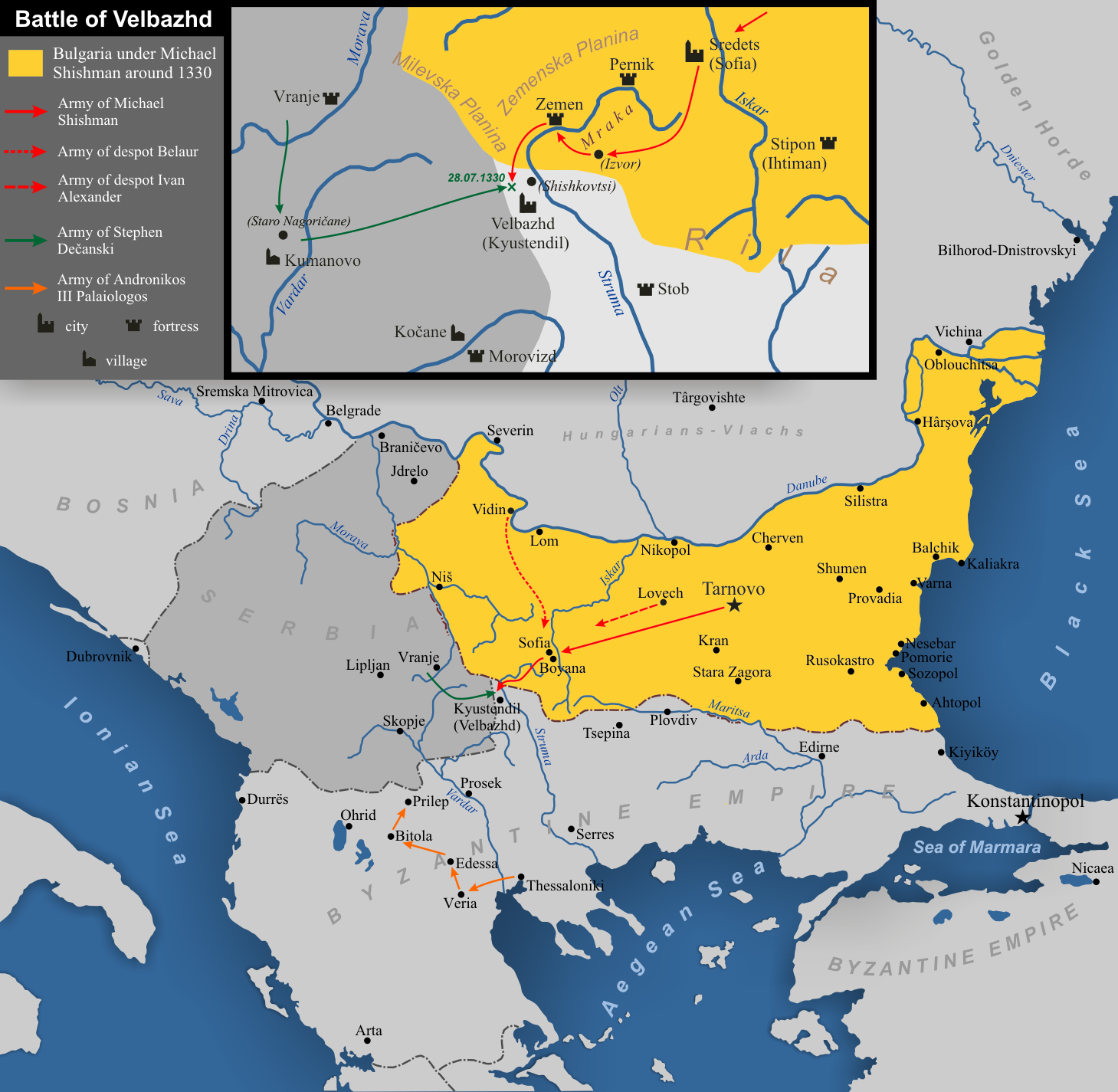
Bulgaria during the rule of Michael Shishman.

The sudden death of George Terter II had been followed by a brief period of confusion and uncertainty, which was exploited by the Byzantine emperor Andronikos III Palaiologos. The Byzantines overran northeastern Thrace and captured a number of important cities including Yambol, Lardea, Ktenia, Rusokastro, Anchialus, Sozopol and Agatopol. At the same time, a Byzantine-sponsored pretender, Voysil, brother of the former Bulgarian emperor Smilets (r. 1292-1298), ensconced himself in Krăn, controlling the valleys between the Balkan Mountains and Sredna Gora from Sliven to Kopsis. At this point the newly elected Michael Shishman marched south against Andronikos III, while another Byzantine army led by Andronikos III himself was besieging Philippopolis (Plovdiv). Defended by a Bulgarian garrison led by Ivan the Russian, the siege was a failure despite the Byzantines use of a 100-soldier, five-story siege tower. While the Byzantine army was engaged at Philipopolis, Michael Shishman led his troops to north-eastern Thrace and quickly retook the lost cities thus forcing the Byzantines to pull back.

Although Michael Shishman forced Andronikos III to retreat, the Byzantines managed to take the Philippopolis while the Bulgarians were changing garrisons. Despite the loss, Michael Shishman was able to expel Voysil and fully recover Bulgarian control over northern and northeastern Thrace in 1324 which had been taken by the Byzantines in the previous year during the interregnum. Again in 1324, the Bulgarian emperor invaded Byzantium advancing as far as Traianopolis and Vira in the lower course of the Maritsa river. Andronikos III was unable to engage the Bulgarian army because his troops were outnumbered. He offered Michael Shishman a duel to solve the conflict. The Bulgarian emperor answered with the words cited by John Kantakouzenos:

Stupid would be the blacksmith who instead of taking the hot iron with pincers takes it with his hands. He himself would be ridiculed by the Bulgarians if he risks not his large and strong army but his own body.

The Byzantine emperor was said to have been infuriated with the answer and the fact that he was outsmarted. However, Michael III who was informed of the conflict between Andronikos III and Andronikos II hinted him that he could help Andronikos III against his grandfather in case of war and returned to Bulgaria promising that soon he would begin negotiations.

=== Peace agreement and involvement in Byzantine civil war ===
On a council held in Constantinople on the relations with Bulgaria, it was decided that the two countries should begin negotiations despite the calls for punishing the Bulgarians for the invasion. Michael Shishman divorced his wife Anna Neda and married Theodora Palaiologina, the 35-year-old widow of emperor Theodore Svetoslav. The exact reasons for that act are unclear. Many historians suggest that the deterioration of the Bulgarian-Serbian relations was rooted in the Serbian penetration in Macedonia. The marriage cemented the peace treaty with the Byzantine Empire but the need for an ally against the Serbs made Michael Shishman prone to make concessions. It was decided that the border should follow the Philippopolis-Chernomen-Sozopol line. The agreement was finally signed in the autumn of 1324 and Michael Shishman spent the next several years at peace with his neighbors.

In 1327 Michael Shishman became involved in the renewed civil war in the Byzantine Empire, taking the side of his brother-in-law Andronikos III, while his grandfather and rival Andronikos II obtained the support of the Serbian king. Andronikos III and Michael Shishman met at Chernomen (according to Nicephorus Gregoras at Dimotika) and concluded an aggressive alliance against Serbia. The Byzantine emperor promised to Bulgaria territory with several towns and large amount of money if he would become a sole emperor. Based on that alliance, Andronikos III gained control of Macedonia but his success made Michael Shishman, who aimed at a prolonged conflict within the Byzantine Empire, enter into negotiations with Andronikos II, offering military support in exchange for money and the cession of some border lands. The Bulgarian ruler sent a detachment of 3,000 cavalry, commanded by Ivan the Russian, from Yambol to guard the Imperial Palace in Constantinople and Andronikos II but his intentions were to capture the old emperor and the city. Forewarned by his grandson, Andronikos II prudently kept the Bulgarians away from the capital and his person. When Michael Shishman understood that his plans were revealed he sent Ivan a letter with a single feather to retreat which meant that the orders had to be promptly executed.

Following the victory of Andronikos III over his grandfather, Michael Shishman attempted to gain some lands by force. He invaded Thrace in June 1328 and pillaged the vicinities of Viza but retreated before the advance of Andronikos III. Another showdown in front of Adrianople 60 days later ended without battle and with the renewal of the peace treaty in October 1328, after which Michael Shishman returned to his country, but not before securing a large payoff. In return, the Bulgarians gave back the fortress of Bukelon which they had taken during the initial stages of the campaign. At the beginning of the next year the Bulgarian emperor requested a personal meeting with his Byzantine counterpart to negotiate a definitive treaty and joint military operations against the growing power of Serbia. In the locality known as Krimni between Sozopol and Anchialus the two signed "lasting peace and eternal alliance".

== Relations with Serbia ==
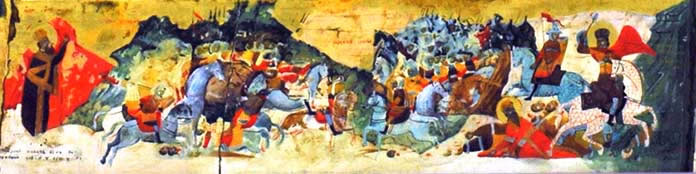
The battle of Velbazhd, a frescoe in the Visoki Dečani

The divorce with Anna Neda in 1324 worsened the relations between Bulgaria and Serbia which had been cordial since the beginning of the 14th century. Anna Neda had to leave the capital Tarnovo with her sons and sought refuge from her brother Stephen Dečanski, the king of Serbia. Dečanski, who was engaged in war against his cousin Stephen Vladislav II, was in no position to oppose Michael Shishman. The Bulgarian emperor even acknowledged his rival as King of Serbia but his help to Vladislav was insufficient. In the spring of 1324 Dečanski sent the future Serbian archbishop Danilo II to negotiate with the Bulgarian emperor in Tarnovo but his mission was inconclusive. The two countries were again on the opposite sides in the Byzantine civil war when the Bulgarians allied with Andronikos III while the Serbs supported his grandfather.

After the agreement with Andronikos III in 1329, Michael Shishman started preparations to attack while the Serbs were pillaging the areas around Ohrid. According to the Serbian chroniclers, he arrogantly demanded the submission of the Serbian king and threatened to "set up his throne in the middle of the Serbian land". In 1330, expecting to join the army of Andronikos III advancing from the south, Michael Shishman marched on Serbia with a large force of 15,000 troops, including reinforcements from his vassals and allies from Wallachia and Moldavia. At first he headed to Vidin, where historians believe he wanted to join forces with the soldiers of his brother Belaur, and then marched to the south. Due to poor coordination with the Byzantines, the Bulgarian army met the Serbs, whose army numbered 15,000 men as well, alone near Velbazhd (Kyustendil). On a personal meeting, the two rulers agreed to a one-day truce as both were expecting reinforcements. Backed on the agreement, Michael Shishman allowed his army to disperse in search for provisions. However, in the morning of 28 July, the main Serbian reinforcements, 1,000 heavily armed Catalan horsemen mercenaries under the command of the King's son Stephen Dušan arrived, and the Serbs broke their word and attacked the Bulgarians. Despite the unexpected assault, Michael Shishman tried to bring his army to order but it was too late and the Serbs were victorious. The outcome of the battle shaped the balance of power in the Balkans for the next decades to come and although Bulgaria did not lose territory, the Serbs could occupy much of Macedonia.

== Death and legacy ==
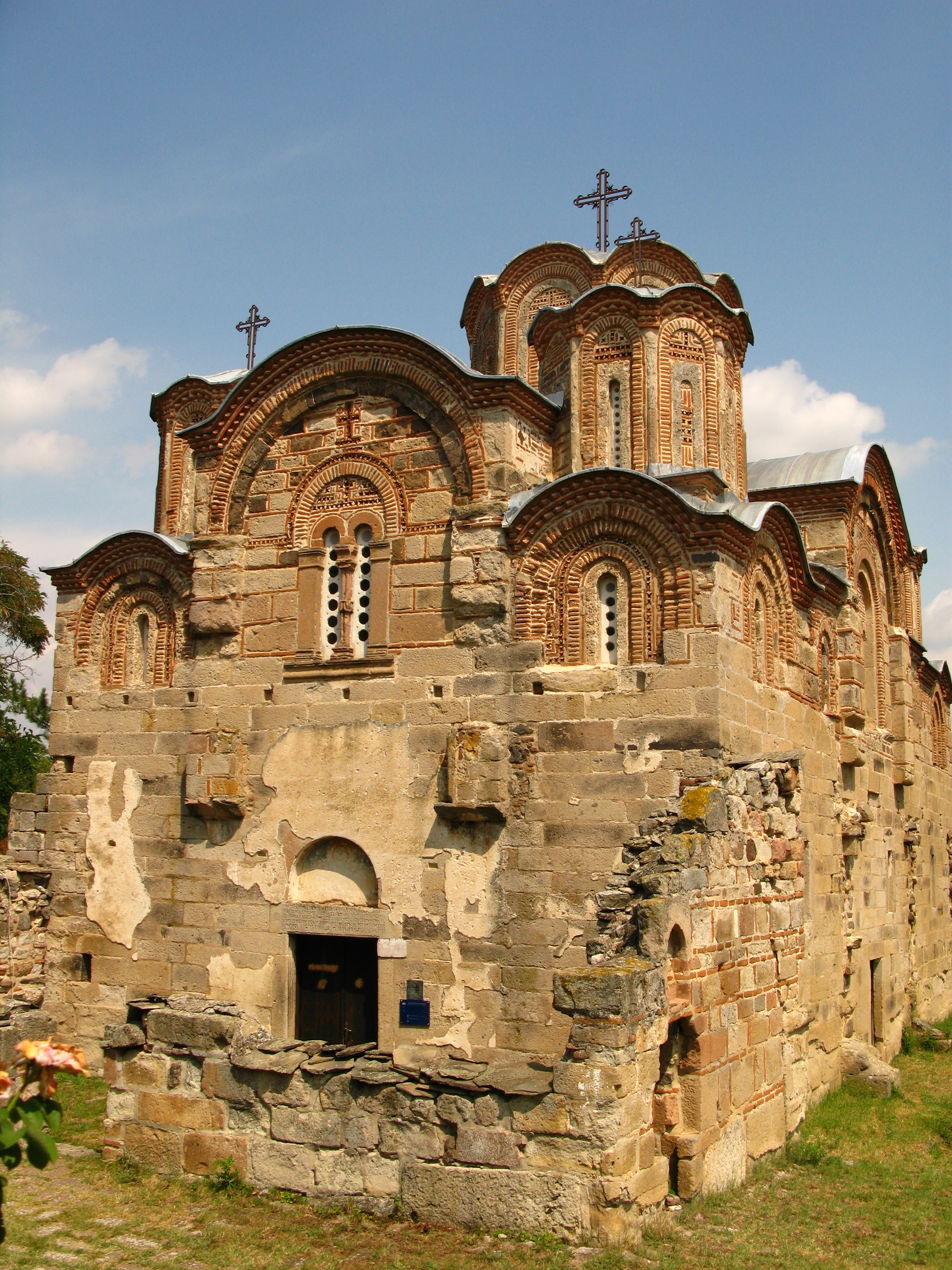
The Church of St George where Michael Shishman was buried.

The circumstances around the death of Michael Shishman are unclear. According to the Byzantine emperor and historian John Kantakouzenos the emperor was mortally wounded in the battle and soon died while another Byzantine historian suggests that Michael Shishman lived for three more days not able to gain consciousness and died on the fourth day. The Serbian chronicles state that his horse fell during the battle and crashed his body. When his body was taken to Dečanski, he mourned him but pointed out that he preferred war to peace. The early 15th-century Bulgarian scholar and cleric Gregory Tsamblak says that Michael Shishman was captured and killed by the son of the Serbian king, Stephen Dušan. He was buried in the Church of St George in Staro Nagoričane.

Michael Shishman is considered a vain, aggressive, and opportunistic ruler, whose Protean foreign policy perhaps contributed to the battle that put an end to his life. At the same time, he was clearly forceful and energetic, overcoming and reversing Bulgaria's losses during the uncertainty that preceded his accession, and managing to maintain internal peace and security within Bulgaria during his short reign. Andreev calls him the most remarkable 14th-century Bulgarian monarch. According to Kantacouzenos he desired to expand the country from Byzantium to the Istros, i. e. from Constantinople to the Danube which makes him the last medieval Bulgarian ruler who effectively attempted to capture the Byzantine capital. He was also the first Bulgarian ruler for decades who tried to lead a more active policy in Macedonia. Michael Shishman's seal is depicted on the reverse of the Bulgarian 2 levs banknote, issued in 1999 and 2005.

== Family ==
Michael Shishman was married first to Ana of Serbia, a daughter of King Stefan Uroš II Milutin of Serbia. By this marriage he had several children, including Ivan Stephen, who succeeded as emperor of Bulgaria (r. 1330–1331), Michael, who was titled despot, perhaps in Vidin, Shishman, and Lodovico, attested as titular emperor of Bulgaria in Italy. By his second marriage to Theodora Palaiologina, a daughter of Michael IX Palaiologos of Byzantium, Michael Shishman had several children whose names are unknown.

Family tree of the Shishman Dynasty

Shishman married to Unknown
Michael Asen III "Shishman" (r. 1323–1330) married to 1. Anna Neda 2. Theodora Palaiologina	Belaur	Keratsa Petritsa, married to despot Sratsimir
1. Ivan Stephen; (r. 1330–1331)	1. Shishman	1. Michael, married to unknown	1. Lodovico; married to Maria of Taranto	2. Unknown
Ivan Alexander (r. 1331–1371) married to 1. Theodora Besarab 2. Sarah-Theodora	John Komnenos Asen married to 1. Unknown 2. Anna Palaiologina	Michael married to unknown	Helena married to Stefan Dushan (r. 1331–1355)	Theodora
Alexander Komnenus Asen, Xenia Ivanina Komnena	Shishman
1. Michael Asen IV married to Irina Palaiologina	1. Ivan Sratsimir; (r. 1356–1396) married to Anna	1. Ivan Asen IV	1. Kera Tamara married to Constantine Murad I (r. 1362–1389)	2. Keratsa-Maria married to Andronikos IV Palaiologos (r. 1376–1379)	2. Ivan Shishman; (r. 1371–1395) married to 1. Kira Maria 2. Dragana	2. Ivan Asen V	2. Desislava	2. Vasilisa
Constantine II (r. 1397–1422)	Dorothea married to Tvrtko I (r. 1353-1391)	Unknown daughter	John VII Palaiologos (r. 1390)	2 unknown daughters	Alexander	Fruzhin married to unknown	Keratsa	4 unknown; Patriarch Joseph II possible illegitimate son
Shishman	2 unknown

== Timeline ==
- 1291 — Michael Shishman is engaged to Anna Neda of Serbia
- 1298 or 1299 — Marries Anna Neda
- By 1308 — Becomes Despot of Vidin
- 1323 — Elected Emperor of Bulgaria by the nobility, uses the name Michael Asen
- 1324 — Successful war with the Byzantine Empire; divorces his first wife to marry Theodora Palaiologina
- 1327 — Involvement into the Byzantine civil war; Treaty of Chernomen
- 1329 — Definitive peace treaty with the Byzantines; anti-Serbian agreement
- 28 July 1330 — Battle of Velbazhd; Michael Shishman is mortally wounded and dies

== Notes ==
a: The common usage Michael Shishman is technically inaccurate, as it consists of the name Michael followed by the patronymic Shishman, i.e., Michael [the son of] Shishman. Contemporary Bulgarian and Byzantine sources show that the emperor reigned under the name Michael Asen: Mladjov 2015: 276-277. He is also known among historians as Michael III Shishman or Michael III Shishman Asen.
b: Traianopolis was a town near modern Feres, situated at 2 kilometres (1.2 mi) of the Maritsa river in Western Thrace.
c: The numbers designate which wife each child was born to.

== Bibliography ==
- Андреев (Andreev), Йордан (Jordan); Лалков (Lalkov), Милчо (Milcho) (1996). Българските ханове и царе [The Bulgarian Khans and Tsars] (in Bulgarian). Велико Търново (Veliko Tarnovo): Абагар (Abagar). ISBN 954-427-216-X.
- Božilov, Ivan, Familijata na Asenevci (1186–1460), Sofia, 1985.
- Вожилов (Bozhilov), Иван (Ivan); Гюзелев (Gyuzelev), Васил (Vasil) (1999). История на средновековна България VII-XIV век [History of Medieval Bulgaria 7th–14th Centuries] (in Bulgarian). София (Sofia): Анубис (Anubis). ISBN 954-426-204-0.
- Fine, J. (1987). The Late Medieval Balkans, A Critical Survey from the Late Twelfth Century to the Ottoman Conquest. The University of Michigan Press. ISBN 0-472-10079-3.
- Колектив (Collective) (1980). "XIX. Йоан Кантакузин (XIX. John Kantakouzenos)". Гръцки извори за българската история (ГИБИ), том X (Greek Sources for Bulgarian History (GIBI), volume X) (in Bulgarian and Greek). София (Sofia): Издателство на БАН (Bulgarian Academy of Sciences Press).
- Gregory, T. (2005). A History of Byzantium. Blackwell Publishing. ISBN 0-631-23513-2.
- Jireček, Konstantin (1977). Geschichte der Bulgaren (in German). Frankfurt am Main: Textor Verlag. ISBN 978-3-938402-11-5.
- Kazhdan, A.; collective (1991). "Volume II". The Oxford Dictionary of Byzantium. New York, Oxford: Oxford University Press. ISBN 0-19-504652-8.
- Mladjov, Ian, "The Bulgarian Prince and would-be Emperor Lodovico," Bulgaria Mеdiaevalis 2 (2011), 603–618. online
- Mladjov, Ian, "The Children of Ivan Asen II and Eirēnē Komnēnē," Bulgaria Mediaevalis 3 (2012) 403-418 online
- Mladjov, Ian, "Monarchs' Names and Numbering in the Second Bulgarian State," Studia Ceranea 5 (2015) 267-310 online.
- Nikolov-Zikov, Petăr, Domăt na Šišman, Sofia, 2021.
- Павлов (Pavlov), Пламен (Plamen) (2005). "Руски "бродници", политически политически бегълци и военачалници през XII-XIV век (Russian "Vagrands", Political Refugees and Commanders during the 12th–14th Centuries)". Бунтари и авантюристи в средновековна България (Rebels and Adventurers in Medieval Bulgaria) (in Bulgarian). Varna: LiterNet. ISBN 954-304-152-0.
- Popov, Tenčo, Studii vǎrhu bǎlgarskoto srednovekovno monetosečene s izvodi za istorijata, Sofia, 2020.

Preceded by George Terter II	Emperor of Bulgaria; 1323–1330	Succeeded by Ivan Stefan
