= Donja Kamenica =

- Village
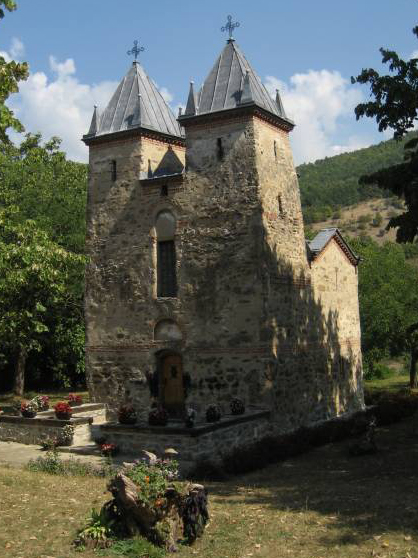
- The 14th-century Church of the Holy Mother of God in Donja Kamenica

- Location within Serbia
- Coordinates: 43°29′23″N 22°19′31″E
- Country: Serbia
- District: Zaječar District
- Municipality: Knjaževac

Population (2002)
  - Total: 360
- Time zone: UTC+1 (CET)
  - Summer (DST): UTC+2 (CEST)

Donja Kamenica is a village in the municipality of Knjaževac, Serbia. According to the 2002 census, the village has a population of 360 people.

The 14th-century Church of the Holy Mother of God in Donja Kamenica is notable for its unusual architectural style and fresco paintings. It is protected as a cultural monument of great importance.
