= Ktenia =

Coordinates: 42°47′24″N 26°52′31″E

Ktenia Ктения
- Burgas Province, Bulgaria

Site information
- Condition: In ruins

Location

Site history
- Events: Byzantine–Bulgarian Wars; Bulgarian-Ottoman Wars

Ktenia (Bulgarian: Ктения, Greek: Κτένια) is a ruined Roman and medieval fortress, 2.1 kilometres (1.3 mi) north of the village of Lozarevo in Sungurlare Municipality, Burgas Province, south-eastern Bulgaria. In the Middle Ages, Ktenia often changed hands between Bulgaria and Byzantium.

The ruins of the fortress lie northeast of the town of Sungurlare, in the Grebenets section of the Eastern Balkan Mountains. In ancient and medieval times, it served as an important defensive position guarding the Karnobat Pass through the mountains. Neighbouring castles included Rusokastro to the southeast and Aytos to the east. It is uncertain whether Ktenia is identical with the castle named Goloe, which lay in the same region, or whether these were separate fortifications.

In 705, Ktenia became part of the First Bulgarian Empire when the Zagore area was ceded to Tervel by the Byzantine Empire. When the Bulgarian Empire was reestablished at the end of the 12th century, Ktenia was once again under Bulgarian control until it was conquered by the Byzantines during the Uprising of Ivaylo (1277–1280). The fortress was recovered by Bulgaria after a successful war by emperor Theodore Svetoslav (r. 1300–1321) in 1304. However, it was lost during the period of uncertainty after the premature death of his son George II Terter (r. 1321–1322). Ktenia was quickly recaptured by the new emperor Michael Shishman (r. 1323–1330) in 1324. After another brief Byzantine occupation between 1330 and 1332, it was once again captured by the Bulgarians in the aftermath of the Battle of Rusokastro on 18 July 1332.

== Sources ==
- Andreev, Jordan; Milcho Lalkov (1996). The Bulgarian Khans and Tsars (in Bulgarian). Veliko Tarnovo: Abagar. ISBN 954-427-216-X.
