= Belaur =

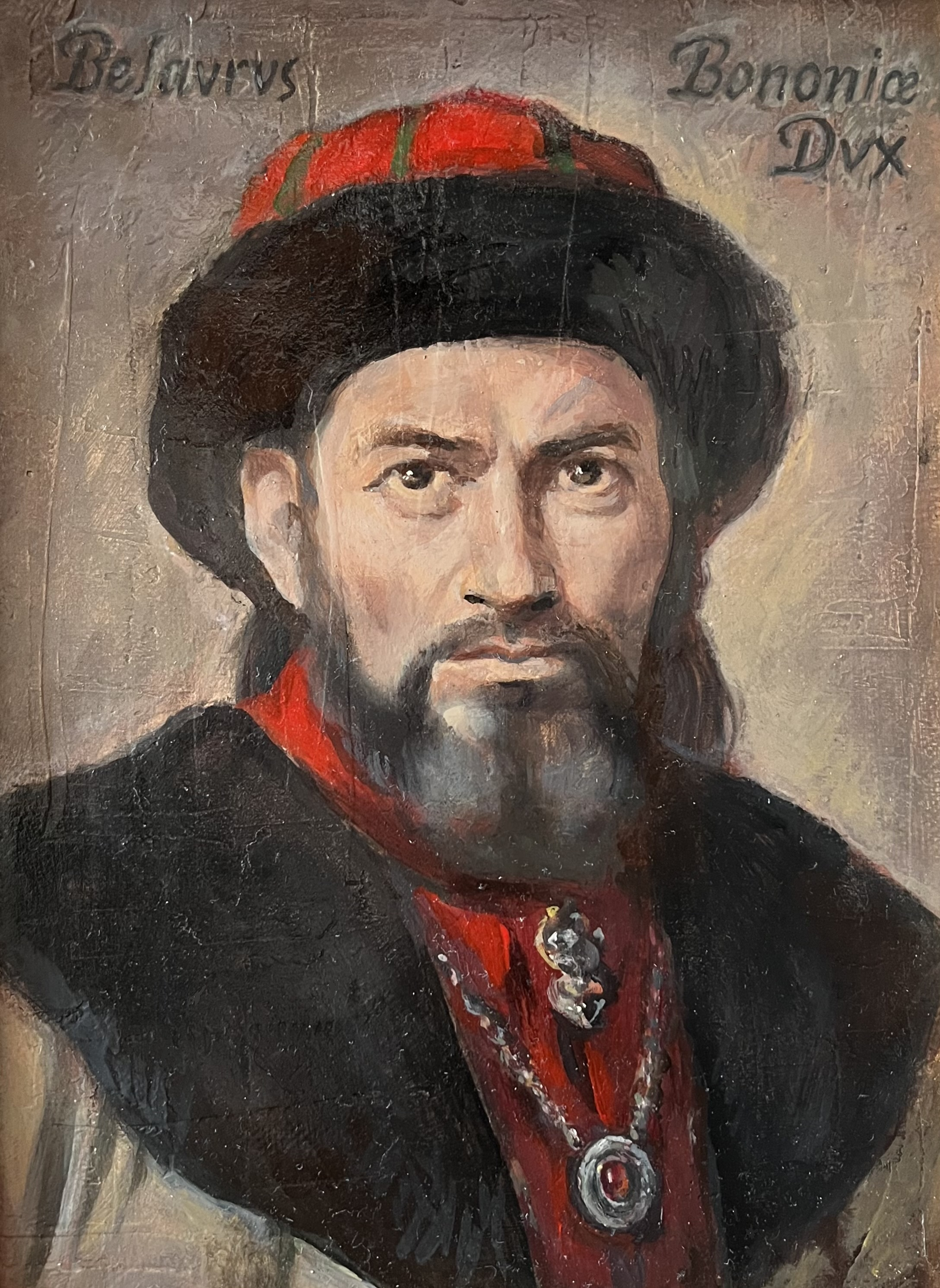
Belaur

Belaur (Bulgarian: Белаур) (died 1336) was a Bulgarian noble and despot of Vidin and brother of the Bulgarian Emperor Michael Shishman (1323–1330). The son of Shishman of Vidin, he was among the most elaborate Balkan diplomats of his time. Plamen Pavlov interprets Belaur's name as stemming from the Hungarian personal name Béla and the title ur ("prince"). It may also come from Balaur, a mythical dragon in Vlach/ Romanian culture, the dragon was supposedly also revered in Cuman culture, cf. Kipchak "uran, ewren". Vlach-Cuman cultural interactions are known through the Cuman origin of the Basarab dynasty and the Vlach identification of the Asenid dynasty, named after the founder of the dynasty, Bilgun Asen, who carries a Cuman name and title.

He participated in the campaign of Michael Shishman against the Serbs in the unfortunate battle of Velbazhd. He was in command of the reserve together with the despot of Lovech Ivan Alexander and did not participate in the battle. However his troops were enough to prevent a Serbian invasion and he led the Bulgarian delegation which negotiated with the Serbian King Stefan Decanski. Belaur actively supported his nephew Ivan Stefan, son of Michael Shishman from his first wife Anna Neda to succeed the Bulgarian crown and was the prime adviser of the new Emperor. He refused to acknowledge the dethronement of Ivan Stefan in 1331 and confronted with his other nephew Ivan Alexander who was son of his sister Keratsa Petritsa. In 1332 he detached the Vidin Province from the central government in Tarnovo and caused serious troubles for Ivan Alexander who had to fight against the Byzantines in Thrace.

After he defeated the Byzantines at Rusokastro in 1332 Ivan Alexander concentrated on his uncle. The war between the two waged for 5 years. In 1336 the Emperor sent 10,000 soldiers who defeated Belaur in a battle near the river Vit and finally restored his authority over Vidin.
