= Ivan Stefan of Bulgaria =

Tsar of Bulgaria from 1330 to 1331

Ivan Stefan

Tsar of Bulgaria
- Reign: 1330–1331
- Predecessor: Michael Asen III "Shishman"
- Successor: Ivan Alexander
- Died: after 1339, before 1357; Naples, Kingdom of Naples (?)
- Father: Michael Asen III "Šišman"
- Mother: Ana of Serbia

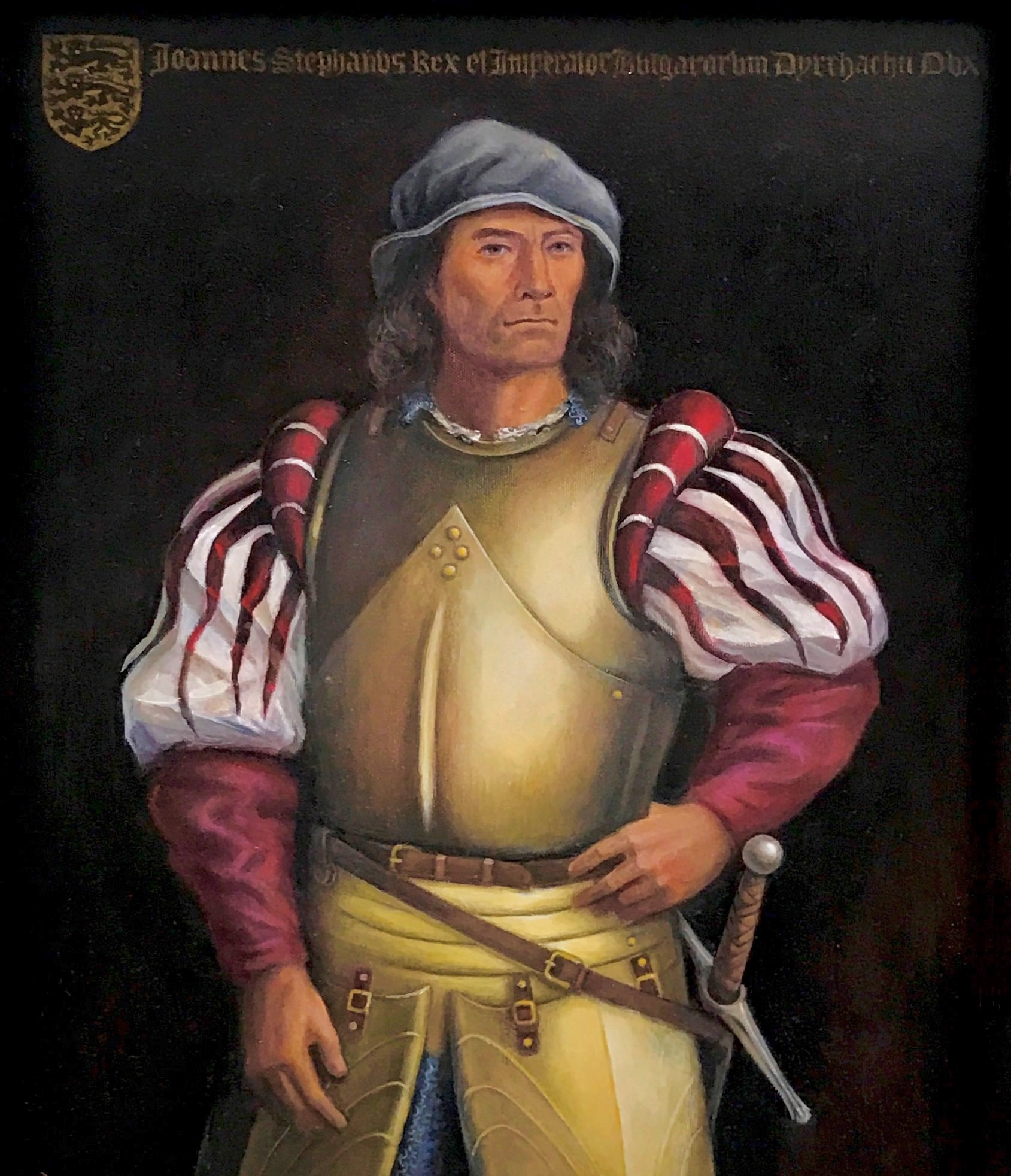
Ivan Stephen of Bulgaria painting by anonymous author, late 19th century.

Ivan Stefan (Bulgarian: Иван Стефан; died after 1339 or 1343 and before 1357), also anglicized as John Stephen, ruled as emperor (tsar) of Bulgaria for eight months from 1330 to 1331.

He was the eldest surviving son of Emperor Michael Asen III "Shishman" and his first wife Ana ("Ana-Neda"), a daughter of King Stefan Uroš II Milutin of Serbia. According to an early interpretation of a rare coin type, it was believed that after his father's accession to the throne in 1323, Ivan Stefan was briefly associated as co-emperor; when Michael Asen III divorced Ana to marry Theodora Palaiologina, the daughter of Byzantine emperor Michael IX Palaiologos, in 1324, Ivan Stephen would have lost this position, as he was exiled along with his mother and brothers. However, recent studies have cast doubt on Ivan Stephen's supposed ascension to the throne, considering the coinage in question a posthumous commemorative issue by either Ivan Stephen or his cousin Ivan Alexander, legitimizing the new monarch advertising his association with Michael Asen III. Moreover, it appears that Ivan Stephen's brother Michael was older, and was at one time intended as heir, with the title of despotes.

== Accession to the throne ==
At the battle of Velbazhd against the Serbs, Emperor Michael Asen III was wounded and died shortly afterwards in captivity. On 2 August, the Bulgarian boyars proposed peace to the Serbian king Stefan Uroš III Dečanski. The Serbian king met them in the Mraka area and accepted the proposals, making Ivan Stephen, by now his father's oldest surviving son, emperor of Bulgaria. Ana and her sons were informed of the agreement and escorted to the Bulgarian capital Tarnovo, where they were installed in August or September 1330; Ivan Stephen's uncle Belaur remained a prominent and supportive figure, apparently governing Vidin. Commonly believed to have been about 30 years of age, Ivan Stephen ruled together with his mother, who seems to have dominated the government; the reasons for this are unknown unless he was indeed substantially younger.

== Byzantine response ==
After Ivan Stephen took the throne, the second wife of Michael Asen III, Theodora Palaiologina, was forced to leave the capital along with her children and fled to her brother, the Byzantine emperor Andronikos III Palaiologos, at Constantinople. Andronikos III summoned his council and decided to abandon the war against Serbia and turn the Byzantine army against the weakened Bulgaria. Andronikos justified the attack on his former ally as defending the rights of his sister and her children to the Bulgarian throne.

When his troops were prepared in Macedonia, Andronikos III invaded Bulgarian Thrace in the summer of 1330. The towns of Anchialos (Pomorie), Messembria (Nessebar), Aetos (Aytos), Ktenia (Kteniya), Rusokastro and Diampolis (Yambol) surrendered without fighting.

== Dethronement and later life ==
During his rule, Ivan Stephen was supported primarily by his uncle Belaur, while much of the nobility considered him a protégé of Dečanski and remained hostile. The discontent with the new government, exacerbated by the losses to the Byzantines, resulted in a palace coup. In March 1331, the protovestiarios Raksin and the logothete Philip led a group of courtiers in overthrowing Ana and her sons. Ivan Stephen's cousin, the despotes of Lovech Ivan Alexander, was chosen as the new emperor of Bulgaria.

Ivan Stephen fled with his mother and at least one brother to Serbia. Here, his uncle Stefan Uroš III Dečanski had been overthrown by his own son, Stefan Dušan, who now allied with Ivan Alexander and married the latter's sister Helena. Under pressure from his new brother-in-law, Stefan Dušan prepared to extradite Ana and her sons, and they fled to Dubrovnik, where they are attested as early as 1332. Another brother of Ivan Stephen, Šišman, had fled to the Mongol Golden Horde in 1331 and reappeared in 1341 at Constantinople, where he was propped up as a potential claimant to the Bulgarian throne. His subsequent fate is unknown, although it is possible that he was the father of Patriarch Joseph II of Constantinople, born c. 1360.

The fate of Ivan Stephen in exile is obscure. Later Ragusan chroniclers, including Giacomo Luccari, Mauro Orbini, and Giunio Resti, conflated local traditions about him with information about his brothers Šišman (whom they knew from Byzantine sources) and Lodovico, as well as an impostor, Nicholas Zap(p)in(n)a, producing a set of confused and implausible narratives. Although Du Cange corrected some of the misinformation, the misleading narrative has continued to influence historical works. For example, the renowned genealogical compendium of Detlev Schwennicke has Ivan Stephen settle in southern Italy, marry the illegitimate daughter of Philip I, Prince of Taranto, join the future Byzantine emperor John VI Kantakouzenos during his escape from Constantinople in 1342, fall a captive at Siena in 1363, and die at Naples in about 1373.

None of this can be associated with Ivan Stephen. The Bulgarian prince at Constantinople in the early 1340s was his brother Šišman, while the one attested in Italy was his other brother, Lodovico, last heard of as a captive at Siena in 1363; the impostor Nicholas Zap(p)in(n)a is said to have died in 1372 or 1373 while attempting to assert himself in Bulgaria. Neapolitan documents indicate that Lodovico became the claimant to the Bulgarian throne sometime after 1339 (when he is called "son of the emperor of Bulgaria") and before 1357 (when he is titled "emperor of Bulgaria" by his Neapolitan relatives), explicitly following the death of an older brother; this precludes any possibility for identifying him with Ivan Stephen, who had already been emperor in 1330–1331. A letter of Queen Joanna I of Naples from August 1343 refers to Ivan Stephen's mother Ana and her sons ("et filiorum ejus") at Dubrovnik, which is possibly an indication that Ivan Stephen was still alive at that time. A document of King Alfonso V of Aragon from 1457 includes a Latin translation of a Greek charter issued at Krujë by "Stephen, in Christ faithful king of the Bulgarians" in 1343, but this involves almost certainly an abbreviation of the contemporary extended royal titulature of the Serbian king Stefan Dušan, which sometimes included reference to his control of Bulgarian territories and who was indeed in control of that town at the time. It thus has no relevance to the fate of Ivan Stephen. If we can give even partial credence to the testimonies of the early modern Ragusan historians, it would be reasonable to conclude that Ivan Stephen probably died at Dubrovnik sometime between 1339 or 1343 and 1357.

== Sources ==
- Andreev, Jordan; Milcho Lalkov (1996). The Bulgarian Khans and Tsars (in Bulgarian). Abagar. ISBN 954-427-216-X.
- Barlieva, Slavia, "An "Emperor of Bulgaria" in Siena in 1363," Bulgaria Mediaevalis 12 (2021) 13-18.
- Božilov, Ivan, Familijata na Asenevci (1186–1460), Sofia, 1985.
- Burmov, Al. (1968). Istorija na Bălgarija prez vremeto na Šišmanovci (1323–1396 g.) (in Bulgarian).
- Du Cange, Charles de Fresne, Histoire de l’empire de Constantinople sous les empereurs françois 2, Paris, 1657.
- Du Cange, Charles de Fresne, Familiae Augustae Byzantinae, Paris, 1680.
- Fine, John, V. A. (1987). The Late Medieval Balkans, A Critical Survey from the Late Twelfth Century to the Ottoman Conquest. Ann Arbor.
- Gregoras, Nicephorus. Byzantina historia
- Ivanov, Y. (1970). The Bulgarian Antiquities in Macedonia (in Bulgarian). Sofia.
- Mladjov, Ian, "The Bulgarian Prince and would-be Emperor Lodovico," Bulgaria Mеdiaevalis 2 (2011), 603–618.
- Nicol, Donald, The Despotate of Epiros 1267–1479, Cambridge, 1984.
- Nikolov-Zikov, Petăr, Domăt na Šišman, Sofia, 2021.
- Popov, Tenčo, Studii vǎrhu bǎlgarskoto srednovekovno monetosečene s izvodi za istorijata, Sofia, 2020.
- Schwennicke, Detlev Europäische Stammtafeln, Band II (1984).

Preceded by Michael Asen III	Emperor of Bulgaria; 1330–1331	Succeeded by Ivan Alexander
