= Jakov Lukarević (historian) =

Ragusan historian and diplomat

Jakov Lukarević, Italian: Giacomo Di Pietro Luccari, (1547 or 1551 - 22 May 1615), was a Ragusan historian and diplomat.

He was born in Ragusa according to different sources in 1547 or 1551, as the son of Rector Petar Lukarević and Mara Bond. Luccari family, also Lukarević or Lukarić, traced its patrician roots to the old Ragusan family. Jakov Lukarević became a member of the Great Council of the Republic of Ragusa in 1571. He was the representative of the Republic to the Ottoman sultan, the Bosnian Pasha. In 1613 he was elected Rector himself. During assignments in the Ottoman Empire in Istanbul, Bosnia and North Africa, he researched the connections between people of Slavic origin and the Islamic world. His work includes 1605 history of the city of Dubrovnik, published in Venice and entitled Comprehensive extract from Dubrovnik chronicles in four books (originally in Italian: Copioso ristretto de gli annali di Rausa, libri quattro). The chronicle covers history of Dubrovnik from its foundation to 1600. In writing this chronicle, Lukarević relied on information and material he was finding in the Dubrovnik archive for the period from 1387 to his time, an old chronicles and works of Byzantine provenience, and other Western and Eastern writers and oral traditions. Although he had little knowledge of chronography and geography, nevertheless, due to the abundance of material he used and numerous references from the works of today's unknown writers, Lukarević's chronicle is a significant contribution to the Dubrovnik history. Among the records, the description of legal provisions and customs in Ragusa is particularly significant, containing valuable information about the political and administrative structure of the Republic. He died in Ragusa.

== See also ==
- Mavro Orbini (1563–1614), Ragusan historian
