= Giunio Resti =

Ragusan politician and writer

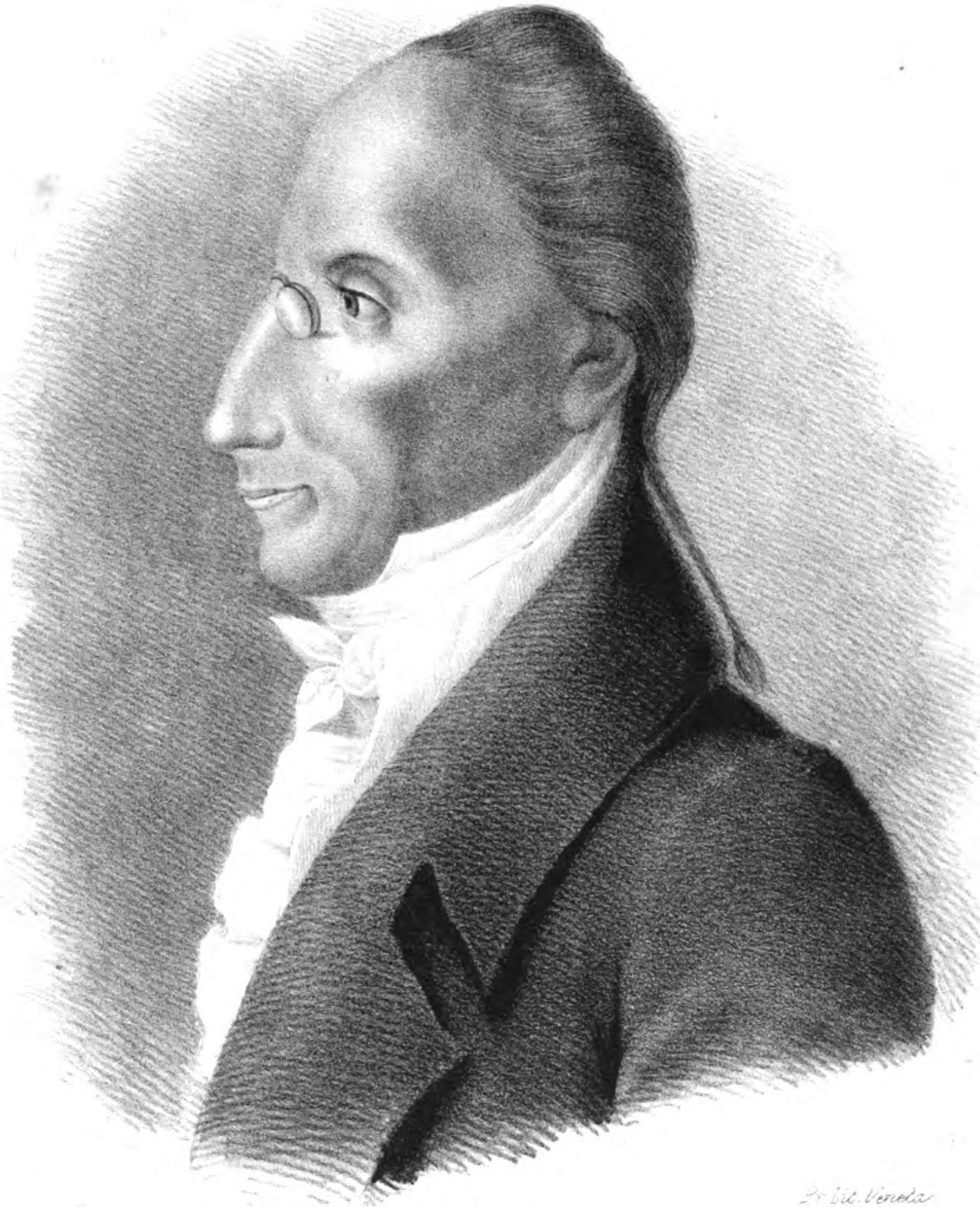
- Born: January 11, 1755; Dubrovnik, Ragusa
- Died: March 30, 1814; Dubrovnik, Dalmatia, Austrian Empire
- Occupation: Politician, Poet, Writer

Giunio Resti (Latin: Junius Restius, Croatian: Džono Rastić; 11 January 1755 – 30 March 1814) was a Ragusan politician and writer. He was a member of the Resti noble family, one of the oldest families in the Republic, first mentioned in 1190. He wrote poetry in Latin, and was a governor of the Lopud island.

Giunio Antonio de Resti was born in 1755 in Ragusa. He studied in the local college of the Jesuits, where humanistic culture and poetry were the main disciplines. He was a polyglot. He soon became a member of the Greater Council, the legislative assembly of the Republic of Ragusa. He was member of the Senate of the Republic. In 1797 he was elected Rector, that is head of the State. He left office after only a month. Made bitter from intrigues and from the compromises of the political life, he was withdrawn dedicating himself to the composition of satire. He witnessed the entrance of Napoleon's envoy, general Lauriston, in 1806, of the formal restoration of the Republic in 1813, and Austrian occupation in 1814. Dispirited, tired and sick, he died on 30 March 1814.

His works were published in four books in 1816 in Padova, by Francisco Maria Appendini, with the title Junii Antonini contis de Restiis, patrici Ragusini, Carmina. The works included satire, several elegie, epistles and poems.`
