= Ana-Neda =

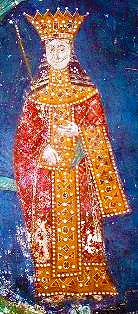

Empress consort of Bulgaria
- Tenure: 1323–1324
- Born: Before 1284
- Died: after 1357; Possibly Dečani monastery
- Burial: Dečani monastery
- Spouse: Michael Asen III "Shishman"
- Issue: Ivan Stephen of Bulgaria; Michael; Šišman; Lodovico
- Royal family: Nemanjić
- Father: Stefan Milutin
- Mother: Elizabeth Arpad

Ana-Neda (Bulgarian Анна-Неда and Serbian Cyrillic: Ана-Неда; fl. 1323–1357) was the Empress consort of Bulgaria briefly in 1323–1324 as the spouse of the "Despot of Vidin", Michael Asen III "Shishman" who was elected as Emperor of Bulgaria in 1323, and Empress of Bulgaria from 1330 to 1331. Some historians believe that she may have ruled as regent for her son, but this hypothesis is meaning as controversial. She was the daughter of Serbian King Stefan Uroš II Milutin and Princess Elizabeth Arpad, daughter of King Stephen V of Hungary and Elizabeth the Kuman, a daughter of Köten. From her marriage with Michael Asen III, Anna had at least four sons, one of whom was Ivan Stephen of Bulgaria, later probably briefly the Emperor of Bulgaria (1330–1331), according to some historians.

== Life ==
Ana was the daughter of Serbian King Stefan Uroš II Milutin and his third wife, Elizabeth of Hungary. She was therefore possibly born sometime before 1284, when her father appears to have divorced Elizabeth to marry Anna of Bulgaria. On her paternal side, she belonged to the Nemanjić dynasty. On her maternal side, she was related to the Hungarian Árpád dynasty and the Anjou dynasty. Her aunt, Maria Árpád, was married to Charles II , King of Naples and Sicily. Anna Neda was a first cousin of Charles and Maria Árpád's sons, King Robert of Anjou and Prince Philip I of Taranto, and her son, Ivan Stefan, was a second cousin of Louis of Taranto and Queen Joanna of Anjou.

Her marriage with Michael Asen III produced:

- Michael, despotes, probably the eldest son, died before 1330
- Ivan Stephen of Bulgaria, emperor of Bulgaria in 1330–1331, died between 1339 and 1357
- Šišman, potential pretender to the Bulgarian throne at Constantinople in 1341
- Lodovico, pretender to the Bulgarian throne in the Kingdom of Naples, died after 1363, probably distinct from any of the above

In 1324, in order to cement an alliance with the Byzantine Empire against the Serbians, Michael Asen III divorced the Serbian Ana Neda in order to marry Theodora of Byzantium. Anna Neda and her children were sent out of Tǎrnovo into the countryside, and imprisoned.

In 1330, Michael Asen III fought the Serbian army, led by Ana's brother Stefan Uroš III, and was killed in the Battle of Velbazhd. Afterwards, the victorious Serbs entered Bulgaria, and convinced Bulgaria to place Ana's son Ivan Stephen on the throne. During Ivan Stephen's one-year reign, Ana seems to have acted as co-ruler and held significant power.

In 1331 Ivan Stephen was deposed by the Bulgarian boyars, and replaced by his father's Bulgarian nephew, Ivan Alexander. Ana, Ivan Stephen, and Lodovico fled to Serbia, while Šišman fled to the Mongol "Golden Horde." The new Bulgarian emperor, Ivan Alexander, allied with Ana's nephew, the new Serbian king Stefan Dušan (who married Ivan Alexander's sister Helena), and demanded the extradition of Ana and her children from Serbia. They sought refuge in Dubrovnik, where they are found already in 1332. As indicated in Neapolitan documents, Ana sought and received the support of her Neapolitan cousins, King Robert and Queen Joanna I. In 1340, Ana was said to be about to depart for Italy, where her son Lodovico had received royal favor since 1338 and married Maria of Taranto, the illegitimate half-sister of the future King Louis I of Naples in 1342. Nevertheless, Ana is found at Dubrovnik between 1343 and 1346. At some point before 1357/1362, Ana had converted to Catholic Christianity like at least two of her sons (probably Ivan Stephen and certainly Lodovico), as reported by King Louis I of Naples to Pope Innocent VI. The date of her death is unknown.

At the end of her life, Ana may have taken monastic vows and received the name Jelena. She was buried in the Dečani monastery. She was consecrated in the Serbian Orthodox Church as Venerable (prepodobna) "St. Jelena of Dečani" (Света Јелена Дечанска), her feast day is on June 3 (May 21, Julian calendar).

== Annotations ==
Name: Recent Bulgarian historians call her Ana-Neda (with a dash). It has been argued that she was born Neda, and upon the marriage to Michael, becoming a queen, she received the titular name Ana. However, it appears that Ana took the name Domenica as a convert to Catholic Christianity, and that this was subsequently translated as Neda (from "недеља" nedelja) in Serbian, which means "Sunday," the Day of the Lord (Dominus).

Ana-Neda Nemanjić dynasty Born: ? Died: ?
Royal titles
Preceded by Theodora Palaiologina	Empress consort of Bulgaria; 1323–1324	Succeeded by Theodora Palaiologina
