= Battle of Velbazhd =

1330 battle in the Balkans

- Part of Bulgarian–Serbian wars
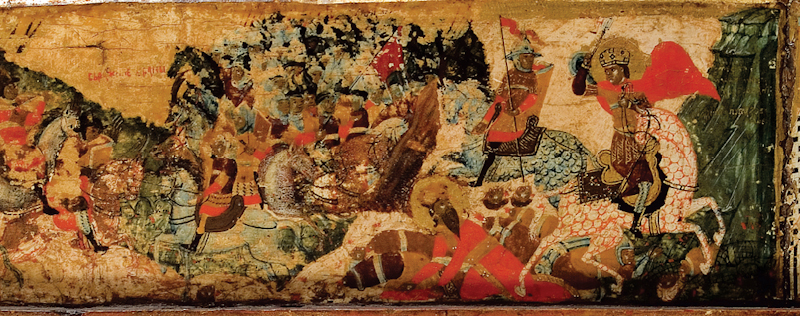
- A detail from a 16th-century icon of Stefan Dečanski, depicting the Battle of Velbazhd.
Date	28 July 1330
Location	Kyustendil, Bulgaria
Result	Serbian victory

Belligerents
Bulgarian Empire; Supported by: Wallachia; Andronikos III Palaiologos (Byzantine Empire)	Kingdom of Serbia; Supported by: Andronikos II Palaiologos (Byzantine Empire) and the Catalan Company

Commanders and leaders
Michael III †; Belaur; Ivan Alexander; Basarab I (WIA)	Stefan Dečanski; Stefan Dušan; Jovan Oliver

Strength
c. 15,000 12,000 Bulgarians, 3,000 mercenaries (Vlachs, Jasz people, Cumans, Tatars)	c. 15,000–18,000: 15,000 Serbs, 1,000–2,000 Catalan mercenaries, mainly Italians from the Kingdom of Naples and 1,000? German mercenaries

Casualties and losses
Heavy	Light

The Battle of Velbazhd (Bulgarian: битка при Велбъжд, romanized: bitka pri Velbazhd; Serbian: Битка код Велбужда, romanized: Bitka kod Velbužda) was fought by the Second Bulgarian Empire and the Kingdom of Serbia on 28 July 1330, near the town of Velbazhd (present day Kyustendil).

The growing power of the Serbian Kingdom from the late 13th century raised serious concerns in the traditional Balkan powers Bulgaria and Byzantine Empire which agreed for joint military actions against Serbia in 1327. Three years later the bulk of the Bulgarian and Serbian armies clashed at Velbazhd and the Bulgarians were caught by surprise. Serbian victory shaped the balance of power in Balkans for the next two decades. The Bulgarians did not lose territory after the battle but were unable to stop the Serbian advance towards Macedonia. Serbia managed to conquer Macedonia and parts of Thessaly and Epirus reaching its greatest territorial extent ever. Their new king Stefan Dušan was crowned Emperor with support from Bulgarian Patriarch Symeon in 1346.

== Origins of the conflict ==
During the long but unsuccessful reign of Emperor Constantine Tikh Asen (1257–1277) the Bulgarian Empire lost its possessions in northern Macedonia including Skopje, the original feudal estate of the Emperor to the Byzantines. Both Empires were faced with serious external and internal problems and from the 1280s the Serbs began to expand their Kingdom to the south in northern Macedonia.

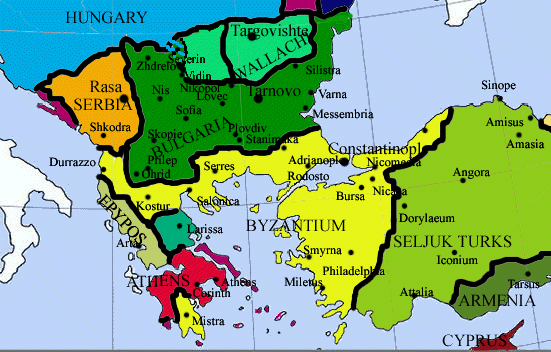
The situation in the Balkans and Asia Minor c. 1261.

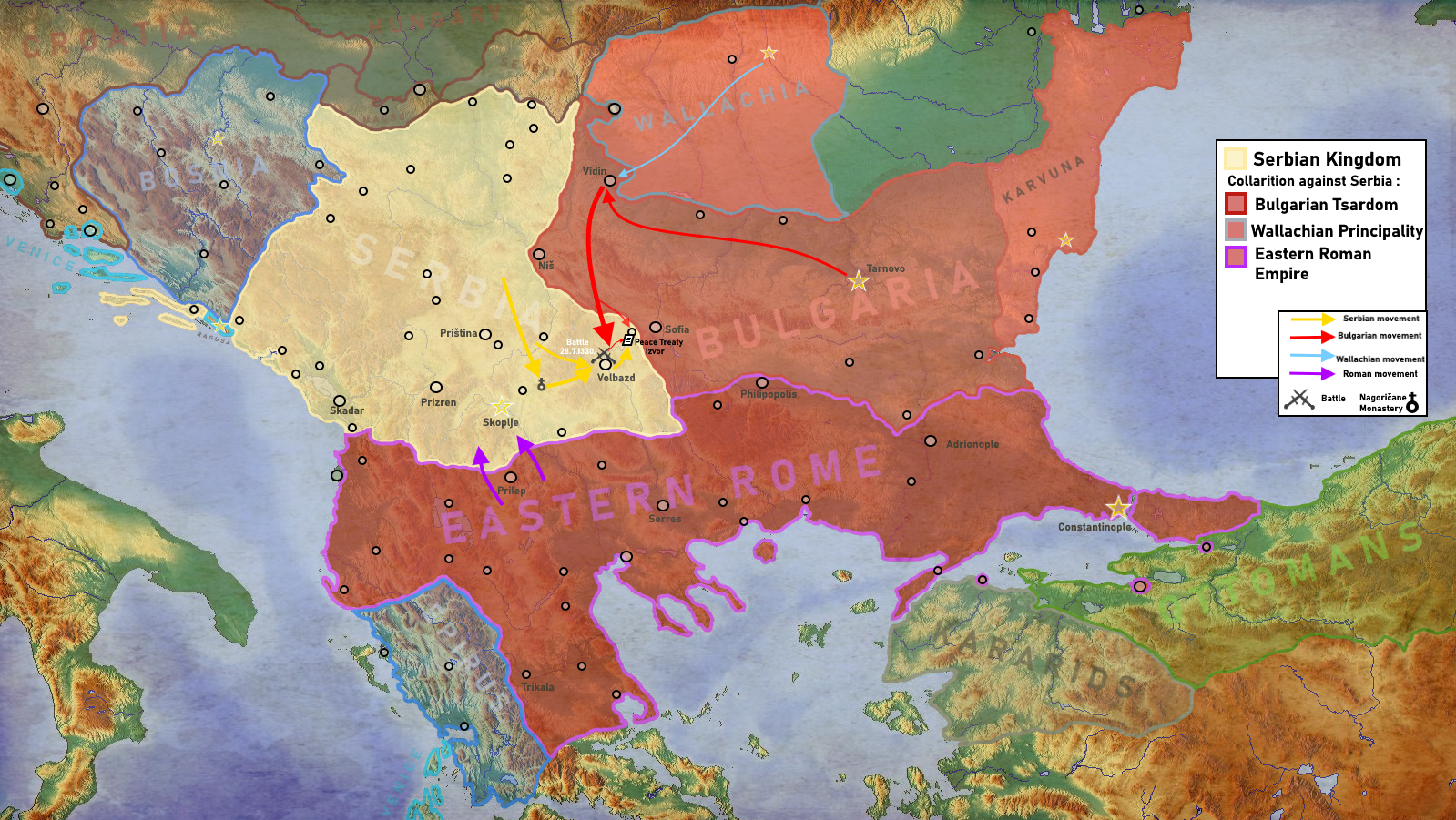
Balkans in 1330.

During the internal war in the Byzantine Empire (1320–1328) waged between the aged emperor Andronikos II Palaiologos and his ambitious grandson Andronikos III Palaiologos, the Serbian king Stefan Uroš III (also known as Stefan Dečanski) actively supported the side of the old emperor and in the process gained some minor forts in Macedonia. After 1328, Andronikos III won and deposed his grandfather. Serbia and the Byzantines entered a period of bad relations, closer to the state of undeclared war. On the other hand, the Bulgarian Emperor Michael Asen III supported his brother-in-law Andronikos III. Previously, in 1324, he divorced and ousted his wife and Stefan's sister Anna Neda, and married Andronikos III's sister Theodora. During that time the Serbs captured some important towns such as Prosek and Prilep and even besieged Ohrid (1329).

The two Empires were seriously worried about the fast growth of Serbia and on 13 May 1327 settled a clearly anti-Serb peace treaty. After another meeting with Andronikos III in 1329, the rulers decided to invade their common enemy; Michael Asen III prepared for joint military operations against Serbia. Michael Shishman desired to retake the north-western and south-western Bulgarian lands which the Serbs had previously conquered. The plan included the thorough elimination of Serbia and its partition between Bulgaria and the Byzantine Empire. According to some Serbian chroniclers, he demanded the submission of the Serbian king and threatened to "set up his throne in the middle of the Serbian land".

== Preparations ==
Both sides took careful preparations. Michael called in his ally Basarab of Wallachia who sent him a strong unit, as well as detachments of Ossetians/Jassiges and Tatars, a total of 3,000 men. Michael's army was estimated by contemporaries to be 15,000 strong. Stefan Uroš strengthened his army by more Catalan and German mercenaries (1,000 soldiers each), experienced warriors which presented an elite unit of Serbian army which comprised a total of 17,000 fighters.

== Operations before the battle ==
According to the plan, the Bulgarians were to advance from the east and the Byzantines from the south and then join forces somewhere in present-day north Macedonia but their coordination was feeble. In July 1330 Andronikos III invaded Macedonia but after he captured Prilep and five minor fortresses he halted his army and decided to await the outcome of the decisive battle between the Bulgarians and Serbs. The Serbian objective was to prevent the joining of the allies and to fight them in separate battles. Fearing an attack on Morava valley by way of Nish, the Serbian King gathered his army in the field of Dobrich, at the confluence of the Toplica river and the Morava.

=== Movements of the Bulgarian army ===
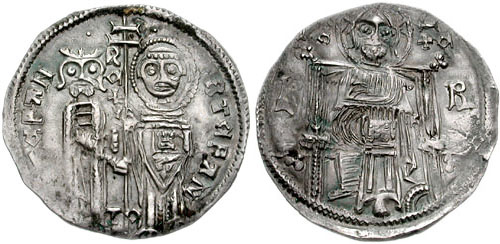
A coin of Stefan Decanski.

On 19 July the Bulgarian army led by the Emperor himself set off from the capital Tarnovo, marched through the Iskar Gorge and Sofia and entered the northern parts of the Struma valley. From there he continued towards Zemen and set his camp in the village of Shishkovtsi On the next day the army reached the important border castle near the modern village of Izvor. From there it was divided into two groups: the main forces under Michael Shishman through the northern parts of the Konyavska mountain (along the border between Bulgaria and Byzantine Empire) and headed towards the Zemen gorge. The smaller part which included the army support went through an easier but longer road through the mountain and arrived between the villages of Konyavo and Dvorishte.

Other Bulgarian forces under the command of the Emperor's brother Belaur set off from his seat in Vidin but did not participate in the battle which was among the main reasons for the following defeat. According to some historians they were stationed as a reserve around the Izvor castle while others think that he arrived too late.

=== Movements of the Serbian army ===
From his camp on the confluence between the Toplica and the Morava rivers Stefan Dečanski expected an attack from Vidin to the north-east. His purpose was to hinder a Bulgarian advance to the interior of his state. Upon the news for the Bulgarian presence in the Struma valley the king marched southwards along the Bulgarian Morava and then the valley of the river Pchinya until he reached the Staro Nagorichino village where stopped for a pray in a nearby monastery. After that he continued to the Ioakim Osogovski Monastery where he prayed again and advanced on Bulgarian territory near the Kamenitsa river in the vicinity of Velbazhd where his army encamped.

== Battle ==
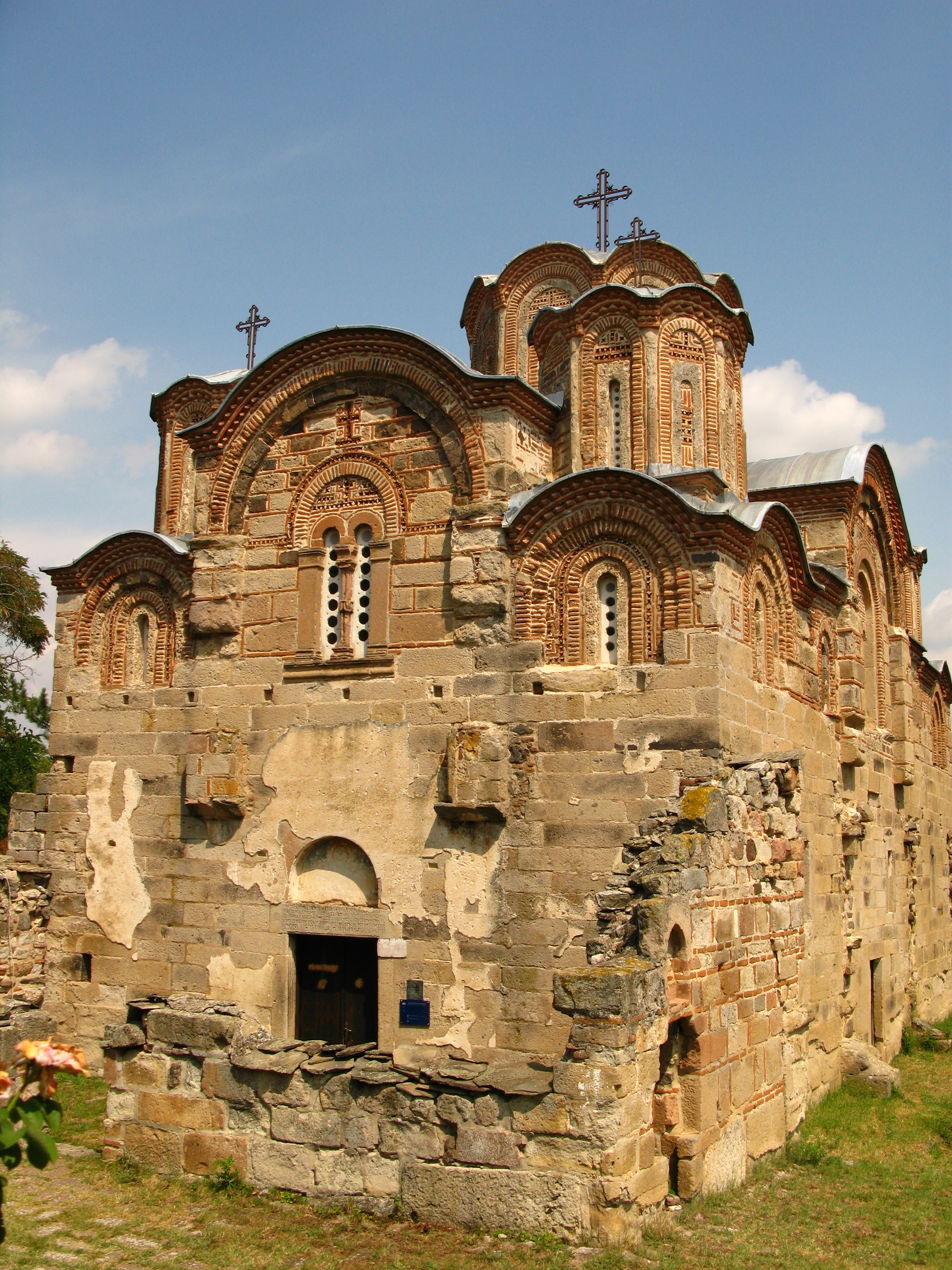
The Serbian army attended holy liturgy in the church of Saint George in Staro Nagoričane, prior to the battle. The Serbian king buried the deceased Bulgarian emperor in the crypt of the church after he was slain in the battle.

The bulk of the two armies camped in the vicinity of Velbazhd, but both Michael Shishman and Stefan Dečanski expected reinforcements and from 24 July they began negotiations which ended with a one-day truce. The Emperor had other problems which influenced his decision for the truce: the army supply units had not yet arrived and the Bulgarians were short on food. Their troops scattered around the country and the nearby villages to search for provisions. Meanwhile, receiving a sizable reinforcement, 1,000 heavily armed Catalan horsemen mercenaries, led by his son Stefan Dušan during the night, the Serbs broke their word and attacked the Bulgarian army early on 28 July 1330 and caught the Bulgarian army by surprise.

One Serbian unit under the command of Dečanski took the Spasovitsa heights while more Serbian troops, including the Catalan mercenaries, penetrated the valley of the Dragovishtitsa River towards the village of Shishkovtsi. The main battle took place between the village and the Spasovitsa heights in a locality called Bozhuritsa.

Caught by total surprise, Michael Shishman attempted to bring his army to order but it was too late and the outnumbered Bulgarian units were crushed. The battle was bloody because the remaining Bulgarian forces on the battlefield stiffly resisted and according to some chroniclers the river reddened. Bulgarian camp was looted by the Serbs. The Emperor himself was badly wounded, his horse killed under him and was captured by the oncoming enemy soldiers. He was taken to the Serbian camp where he probably expired from his wounds on the fourth day of his captivity, on 31 July. Some other theories suggest that he perished on the battlefield or was killed by order of Stefan Dusan. The body of the ill-fated Emperor Michael was brought to King Stefan and was consequently buried in the monastery of Staro Nagoričane (village Staro Nagoričane, near Kumanovo). On the place where he spent his last night praying in his tent, Stefan built a church which still stands.

On the second day after the battle (30 July) the Serbs advanced towards the Konyavska mountain but it was impossible for them to achieve any success because more Bulgarian troops under Michael's brother Belaur and the governor of Lovech Ivan Alexander were concentrated around the Izvor castle and blocked the way to the interior of the country. Near Izvor Belaur met King Stefan Dečanski and they concluded a peace.

== Consequences ==
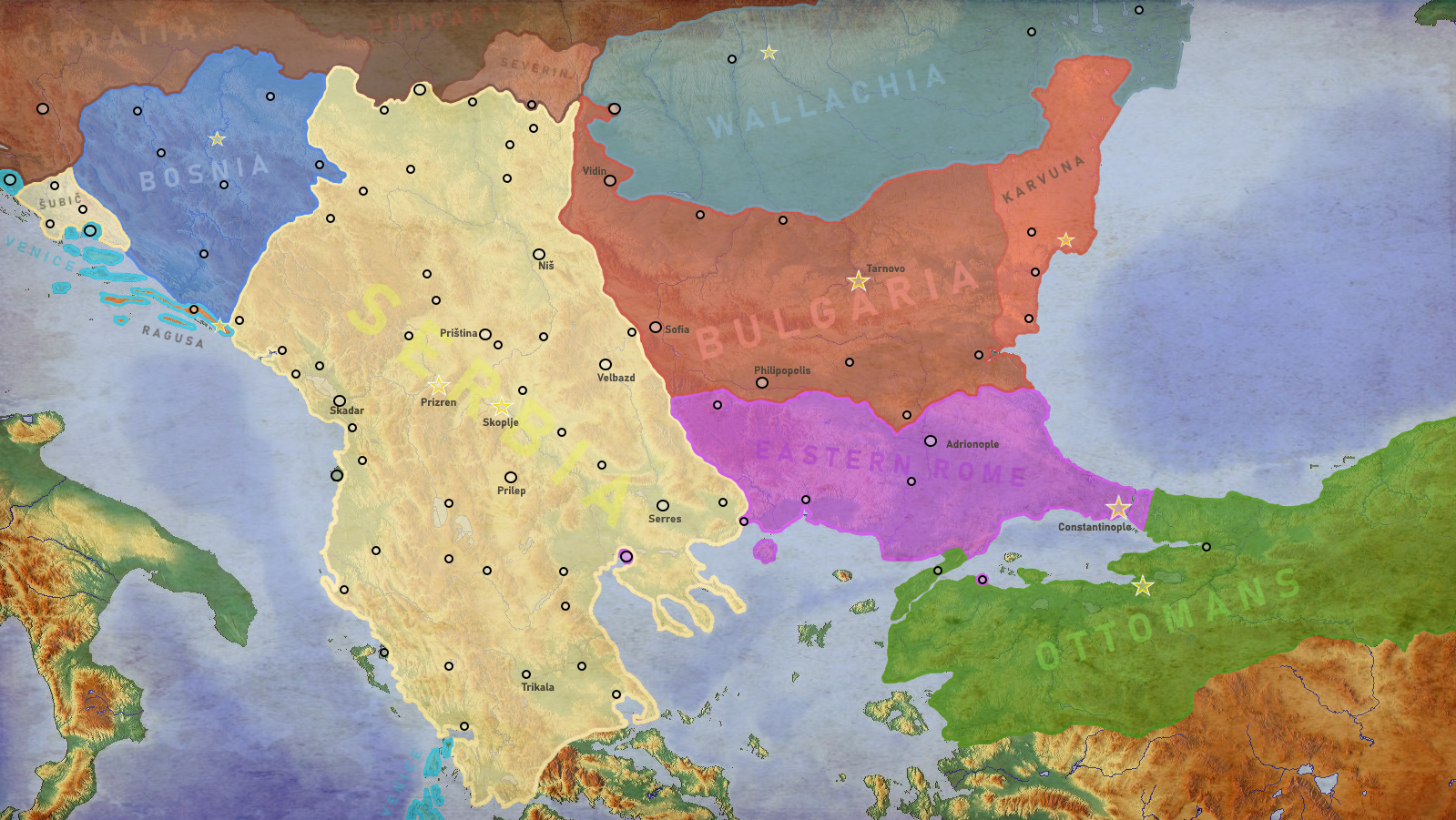
Map of the Balkans in 1354. Serbia had reached its greatest expansion ever following the battle of Velbazhd.

The outcome of the battle shaped the balance of power in the Balkans for decades to come, and although Bulgaria did not lose territory, the Serbs were able to occupy much of Macedonia. Ivan Stefan, son of Michael Shishman and Stefan's sister Anna Neda, ruled for eight months from 1330 to 1331 as tsar of Bulgaria, with the help of his uncle Stephen Dečanski. On 2 August the Bulgarian boyars proposed peace to the Serbian king Stephen Dečanski. Stephen Dečanski met them in the area known as Mraka and accepted the proposal and agreed that Ivan Stephen should become emperor of Bulgaria, thus abandoning the idea of uniting the two countries under the sceptre of his son Stephen Dušan. After the agreement of Mraka was reached, Anna Neda and her sons were informed to go to the Bulgarian capital Tarnovo. Ivan Stephen entered the city and was proclaimed emperor in the second half of August 1330. Although he was in his early 30s, Ivan Stephen ruled together with his mother; the reasons for this are unknown.

Hearing the news of his ally's death, Andronikos decided to abandon the war with Serbia and headed to take advantage of the Bulgarian weakness. However, in 1332 the Bulgarians defeated the Byzantines in the battle of Rusokastro and regained many territories in Thrace. King Stefan reached Macedonia and regained the towns that were taken by the Byzantines at the beginning of the campaign. After a successful end of the war, Stefan returned to building the Visoki Dečani monastery, his grand edifice in the region of Metohija, which he bestowed with many villages in a charter issued at the end of the year.

In the beginning of the year 1331 young king Stefan Dušan rebelled against his father, possibly on the course of further actions against the Byzantine Empire. In stark contrast with his pious father, Dušan was aggressive and was supported by those Serbian nobles who desired wider exploits of the victory by Velebuzhd. During the rebellion (January to April), Bulgarian nobles dethroned Ivan Stefan and brought to rule Ivan Alexander (1331–1371) cousin of Michael.

In the long run Velbuzhd opened a period of around 20 years in which Serbia rose to be the strongest state in South-Eastern Europe. When Dušan succeeded in taking over of the throne later in 1331 he launched attacks on Byzantine possessions, securing northern Macedonia in 1333–1334. Later, he exploited the Byzantine civil war of 1341–1347 to expand his control over all of Macedonia, Albania, Epirus, and Thessaly. Bulgaria and Serbia kept friendly relations and in 1346 Stefan Dušan was crowned Emperor. On 16 April 1346, in Skopje (former Bulgarian capital), he had himself crowned Emperor of the Serbs and Greeks, a title signifying a claim to succession of the Byzantine Empire. These actions, which the Byzantines received with indignation, appear to have been supported by the Bulgarian Empire and tsar Ivan Alexander, as the Patriarch of Bulgaria Simeon had participated in both the creation of a Serbian Patriarchate of Peć and the imperial coronation of Stefan Uroš IV Dušan. Dushan made marriage alliance with Bulgarian tsar Ivan Alexander, marrying his sister Helena.

== Epic poetry ==
The battle is believed to be depicted in traditional Serbian epic poetry, in the gusle song Ban Milutin and Duka Hercegovac.

== See also ==
- Second Bulgarian Empire
- Bulgarian-Serbian Wars
- Medieval Bulgarian Army
- Medieval Serbian army
- Deževa Agreement
- Mirmiran
