= Patriarch Macarius =

Patriarch Macarius may refer to:

- Macarius of Jerusalem, Bishop of Jerusalem in 314–333
- Macarius of Bulgaria, Patriarch of Bulgaria c. 1278–1282
- Patriarch Macarius of Constantinople, r. in 1376–1379 and 1390–1391
