= Patriarch Macarius I =

Patriarch Macarius I may refer to:

- Macarius I of Antioch, Patriarch of Antioch in 656–681
- Macarius of Bulgaria, Patriarch of Bulgaria c. 1278–1282
