= Ignatius I =

Ignatius I may refer to:

- Ignatius of Antioch, bishop in 68–107
- Ignatios of Constantinople, Patriarch of Constantinople in 847–858 and 867–877
- Ignatius of Bulgaria, Patriarch of Bulgaria c. 1272–1278
- Ignatius of Moscow, Patriarch of Moscow and all Russia in 1605–1606
- Ignatius I Daoud, Patriarch of Antioch of the Syrian Catholic Church in 1998–2001
