= Ignatius of Bulgaria =

Patriarch of Bulgaria from 1272 to 1278

- Patriarch of Bulgaria
- Church: Bulgarian Orthodox Church
- Installed: c. 1272
- Term ended: c. 1278
- Predecessor: Joachim II
- Successor: Macarius

Personal details
- Denomination: Eastern Orthodox Church

Ignatius (Bulgarian: Игнатий) was a Patriarch of the Bulgarian Orthodox Church in the 13th century during the rule of Emperor Konstantin Tih (r. 1257–1277). He is listed as the fourth Patriarch presiding over the Bulgarian Church from Tarnovo in the medieval Book of Boril.

The name of Ignatius is linked to the firm position of the Bulgarian Church to maintain the purity of Orthodoxy during the Second Council of Lyon in 1272–1274. In the council the Byzantine Emperor Michael VIII Palaeologus and the Ecumenical Patriarchate of Constantinople were inclined for a union between the Eastern and the Western Churches in order to avoid war with Charles I of Naples. They also demanded the liquidation of the Bulgarian Patriarchate. Patriarch Ignatius decisively opposed those moves and was called a "pillar of Orthodoxy".

From that period dates the idea in medieval Bulgarian literature that the capital of the Bulgarian Empire Tarnovo was a "New Constantinople" (i.e. Third Rome). The city was called in literary works Tsarevgrad Tarnov – the Imperial city of Tarnovo, after the Bulgarian name of Constantinople Tsarigrad.

== Sources ==
- Андреев (Andreev), Йордан (Jordan); Лазаров (Lazarov), Иван (Ivan); Павлов (Pavlov), Пламен (Plamen) (2012). Кой кой е в средновековна България [Who is Who in Medieval Bulgaria] (in Bulgarian). Изток Запад (Iztok Zapad). ISBN 978-619-152-012-1.
- Златарски (Zlatarski), Васил (Vasil) (1972) [1940]. История на българската държава през Средните векове. Том III. Второ българско царство. България при Асеневци (1185–1280). (History of the Bulgarian state in the Middle Ages. Volume III. Second Bulgarian Empire. Bulgaria under the Asen Dynasty (1185–1280)) (in Bulgarian) (2 ed.). София (Sofia): Наука и изкуство (Nauka i izkustvo).

Titles of Chalcedonian Christianity
Preceded by Joachim II	Patriarch of Bulgaria c. 1272–1278	Succeeded by Macarius
