= Macarius of Bulgaria =

Patriarch of Bulgaria from 1278 to 1282

Saint Macarius of Bulgaria
- Patriarch of Bulgaria
- Church: Bulgarian Orthodox Church
- Installed: c. 1278
- Term ended: c. 1282
- Predecessor: Ignatius
- Successor: Joachim III

Personal details
- Denomination: Eastern Orthodox Church

Macarius (Bulgarian: Макарий) was a Patriarch of the Bulgarian Orthodox Church in the 13th century. His name is known only from the medieval Book of Boril where he is listed as the fifth Patriarch presiding over the Bulgarian Church from Tarnovo. He is the only Patriarch mentioned as a "thrice beatified and saintly martyr" which signifies that he met a martyr's death. It is unknown how and when he died.

Patriarch Macarius presided over the Church in a turbulent period of constant menace by the Muslim Mongols, who raided the north-eastern regions of the Bulgarian Empire in the second half of the 13th century. He witnessed the Uprising of Ivaylo between 1277 and 1280 that arose in response the failure of the central authorities to confront the Mongols. During his short tenure four Emperors ascended to the Bulgarian throne: Konstantin Tih (r. 1257–1277), the peasant Tsar Ivaylo (r. 1278–1280), Ivan Asen III (r. 1279–1280) and George Terter I (r. 1280–1292).

== Sources ==
- Андреев (Andreev), Йордан (Jordan); Лазаров (Lazarov), Иван (Ivan); Павлов (Pavlov), Пламен (Plamen) (2012). Кой кой е в средновековна България [Who is Who in Medieval Bulgaria] (in Bulgarian). Изток Запад (Iztok Zapad). ISBN 978-619-152-012-1.

Titles of Chalcedonian Christianity
Preceded by Ignatius	Patriarch of Bulgaria c. 1278–1282	Succeeded by Joachim III
