= Second Bulgarian Empire =

Balkan state (1185 – 1396/1422)

Bulgarian Empire Ц︢рьство блъгарское
- 1185 – 1396 or 1422
- Top: Flag according to Dulcert's portolan (c. 1325); Bottom: Flag according to Soler's portolan (c. 1380) Coat of arms: Shield of the Tsar's Watch in Tarnovo, end of 14th century

- Second Bulgarian Empire under Ivan Asen II
- Capital: Tarnovo (1185–1393); Nikopol (1393–1395); Vidin (1356/1396 as capital of the Tsardom of Vidin)
- Common languages: Middle Bulgarian; Common Romanian; Medieval Greek; Cuman; Albanian
- Religion: Bulgarian Orthodoxy (official, 1204–1235 in the union with Rome); Bogomilism (banned)
- Demonym: Bulgarian
- Government: Monarchy
- Tsar (Emperor)
  - 1185–1197: Peter IV (first)
  - ...: ...
  - 1356–1396: Ivan Sratsimir (last certain)
  - 1397–1422: Constantine II (last possible)
- Historical era: Middle Ages
  - Reestablishment: 1185
  - Fall under Ottoman rule: 1393–1422

Area
- 1230: 293,000 km^{2} (113,000 sq mi)

Population
  - 1230: 1,500,000 to 2,500,000
Preceded by
First Bulgarian Empire
Bulgaria (theme)
Succeeded by
Ottoman Bulgaria
Tsardom of Vidin
Despotate of Dobruja
Despotate of Lovech
- Today part of: Albania; Bulgaria; Greece; Kosovo; North Macedonia; Romania; Serbia; Turkey

The Second Bulgarian Empire (Middle Bulgarian: Ц(а)рьство бл(ъ)гарское; Modern Bulgarian: Второ българско царство, romanized: Vtoro Balgarsko Tsarstvo) was a medieval Bulgarian state that existed from 1185 to 1396, though may have had some remnants until 1422, during the reign of Constantine II of Bulgaria. A successor to the First Bulgarian Empire, it reached the peak of its power under Tsars Kaloyan and Ivan Asen II before gradually being conquered by the Ottomans in the late 14th century.

Until 1256, the Second Bulgarian Empire was the dominant power in the Balkans, defeating the Byzantine Empire in several major battles. In 1205, Emperor Kaloyan defeated the newly established Latin Empire in the Battle of Adrianople. His nephew Ivan Asen II defeated the Despotate of Epiros and made Bulgaria a regional power again. During his reign, Bulgaria spread from the Adriatic to the Black Sea and the economy flourished. In the late 13th century, however, the Empire declined under constant invasions by Mongols, Byzantines, Hungarians, and Serbs, as well as internal unrest and revolts. The 14th century saw a temporary recovery and stability, but also the peak of Balkan feudalism as central authorities gradually lost power in many regions. Bulgaria was divided into three parts on the eve of the Ottoman invasion.

Despite strong Byzantine influence, Bulgarian artists and architects created their own distinctive style. In the 14th century Bulgarian culture, literature, art, and architecture flourished. The capital city Tarnovo, which was considered a "New Constantinople", became the country's main cultural hub and the centre of the Eastern Orthodox world for contemporary Bulgarians. After the Ottoman conquest, many Bulgarian clerics and scholars emigrated to Serbia, Wallachia, Moldavia, and the Russian principalities, where they introduced Bulgarian culture, books, and hesychastic ideas.

== Nomenclature ==
The name most frequently used for the empire by contemporaries was Bulgaria, as the state called itself. During Kaloyan's reign, the state was sometimes known as being of both Bulgarians and Vlachs. Pope Innocent III and other foreigners such as the Latin Emperor Henry mentioned the state as Bulgaria and the Bulgarian Empire in official letters.

In modern historiography, the state is called the Second Bulgarian Empire, Second Bulgarian Tsardom, or the Second Bulgarian Kingdom to distinguish it from the First Bulgarian Empire. An alternative name used in connection with the early 13th century period is the Empire of Vlachs and Bulgarians; variant names include the Vlach–Bulgarian Empire, the Bulgarian–Wallachian Empire, or the Romanian–Bulgarian Empire; the latter name was used exclusively in Romanian historiography.

However, Arabic chronicles from the 13th century had used only the name of Wallachia instead of Bulgaria and gave the Arabic coordinates of Wallachia and specified that Walachia was named "al-Awalak" and the dwellers "ulaqut" or "ulagh".

== Background ==
In 1018, when the Byzantine emperor Basil II (r. 976–1025) conquered the First Bulgarian Empire, he ruled it cautiously. The existing tax system, laws, and the power of low-ranking nobility remained unchanged until his death in 1025. The autocephalous Bulgarian Patriarchate was subordinated to the Ecumenical Patriarch in Constantinople and downgraded to an archbishopric centred in Ohrid, while retaining its autonomy and dioceses. Basil appointed the Bulgarian John I Debranin as its first archbishop, but his successors were Byzantines. The Bulgarian aristocracy and tsar's relatives were given various Byzantine titles and transferred to the Asian parts of the Empire. Despite hardships, the Bulgarian language, literature, and culture survived; surviving period texts refer to and idealize the Bulgarian Empire. Most of the newly conquered territories were included in the themes Bulgaria, Sirmium, and Paristrion.

As the Byzantine Empire declined under Basil's successors, invasions of Pechenegs and rising taxes contributed to increasing discontent, which resulted in several major uprisings in 1040–41, the 1070s, and the 1080s. The initial centre of the resistance was the theme of Bulgaria, in what is now Macedonia, where the massive Uprising of Peter Delyan (1040–41) and the Uprising of Georgi Voiteh (1072) took place. Both were quelled with great difficulty by Byzantine authorities. These were followed by rebellions in Paristrion and Thrace. During the Komnenian Restoration and the temporary stabilisation of the Byzantine Empire in the first half of the 12th century, the Bulgarians were pacified and no major rebellions took place until later in the century.

== History ==
=== Rebellion ===
The disastrous rule of the last Komnenian emperor Andronikos I (r. 1183–85) worsened the situation of the Bulgarian peasantry and nobility. The first act of his successor Isaac II Angelos was to impose an extra tax to finance his wedding. In 1185, two aristocrat brothers from Tarnovo, Theodore and Asen, asked the emperor to provide them a relatively poor pronoia in the Balkan Mountains, in exchange for military service. The emperor refused, resulting in a heated argument which saw Asen struck across the face. Upon their return to Tarnovo, the brothers commissioned the construction of a church dedicated to Saint Demetrius of Salonica. They showed the populace a celebrated icon of the saint, who they claimed had left Thessalonica to support the Bulgarian cause and called for a rebellion. That act had the desired effect on the religious population, who enthusiastically engaged in a rebellion against the Byzantines. Theodore, the elder brother, was crowned Emperor of Bulgaria under the name Peter IV, after the sainted Peter I (r.927–969). Almost all of Bulgaria to the north of the Balkan Mountains—the region known as Moesia—immediately joined the rebels, who also secured the assistance of the Cumans, a Turkic tribe inhabiting lands north of the Danube river. The Cumans soon became an important part of the Bulgarian army, playing a major role in the successes that followed. As soon as the rebellion broke out, Peter IV attempted to seize the old capital of Preslav but failed; he declared Tarnovo the capital of Bulgaria.

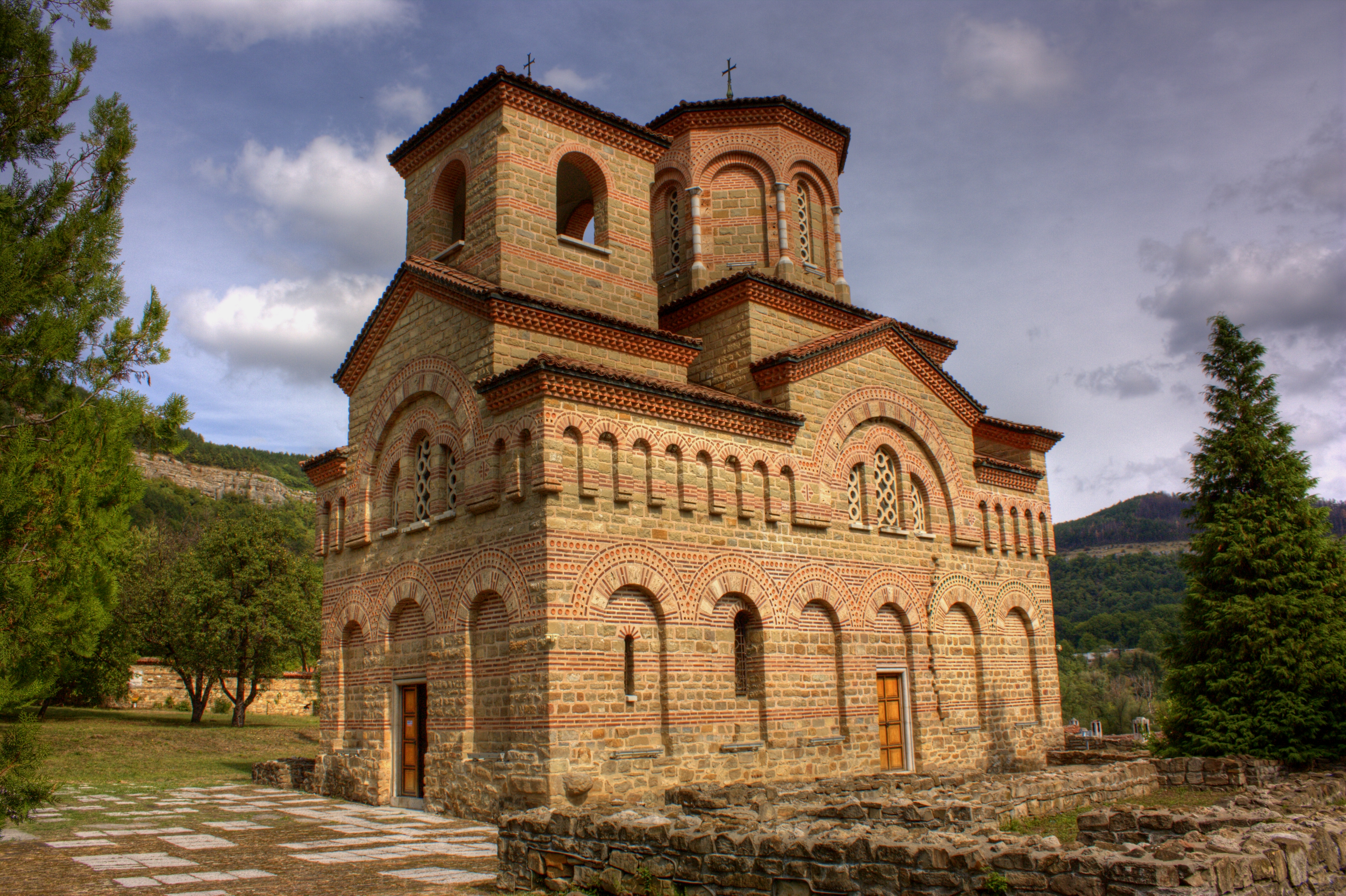
The Church of St Demetrius in Tarnovo, built by Asen and Peter in the beginning of the uprising

From Moesia, the Bulgarians launched attacks in northern Thrace while the Byzantine army was fighting with the Normans, who had attacked Byzantine possessions in the Western Balkans and sacked Thessalonica, the Empire's second largest city. The Byzantines reacted in mid-1186, when Isaac II organized a campaign to crush the rebellion before it spread further. The Bulgarians had secured the passes but the Byzantine army found its way across the mountains due to a solar eclipse. Once the Byzantines reached the plains, the rebels did not risk a confrontation with the larger, better-organized force. Peter IV pretended he was willing to submit, while Asen travelled to the north of the Danube to raise an army. Contented, the Byzantine emperor burned the Bulgarians' crops and returned to Constantinople. Soon after, Asen crossed back over the Danube with Cuman reinforcements, declaring he would continue the struggle until all Bulgarian lands were liberated. A new Byzantine army was assembled under the command of the emperor's uncle John Doukas Angelos, but as Isaac II feared he would be overthrown, Doukas was replaced by John Kantakouzenos, a blind man ineligible for the throne. The Bulgarians attacked Kantakouzenos' camp during the night, killing a large number of soldiers. In mid-1186, another army under the general Alexios Branas was sent in. However, instead of fighting the rebels, Branas turned to Constantinople to claim the throne for himself; he was murdered shortly afterwards. Taking advantage of the chaos, the Bulgarians raided northern Thrace, looting the countryside before Byzantine forces could counterattack. On one occasion, the two armies confronted each other near the fortress of Lardea in an indecisive battle; the Bulgarians kept their plunder and retreated untroubled to the north of the Balkan mountains.

In the late 1186, Isaac II launched his second campaign against Bulgaria. His army was forced to spend the winter in Sofia, giving the Bulgarians time to prepare for the invasion. Early the following year, the Byzantines besieged Lovech but could not seize it; they signed an armistice that de facto recognized Bulgarian independence. In 1189, when the leader of the Third Crusade, emperor Frederick I Barbarossa was at the brink of war with the Byzantines, Asen and Peter IV offered him an army of 40,000 in return for official recognition, but relations between the Crusaders and the Byzantines eventually improved. In 1190, Isaac II led another anti-Bulgarian campaign that ended in a catastrophic defeat at the Tryavna Pass. The emperor barely escaped with his life; the Imperial treasury, including the crown and the cross, were captured by the victorious Bulgarians. After their success, Asen was crowned emperor and became known as Ivan Asen I. Peter IV voluntarily stepped down to make way for his more energetic brother; Peter IV retained his title but Ivan Asen assumed authority.

In the next four years, the focus of the war shifted to the south of the Balkan mountains. Ivan Asen's strategy of swiftly striking in different locations paid off, and he soon took control of the important cities Sofia and Niš to the south-west, clearing the way to Macedonia. In 1194, the Byzantines gathered a huge force composed of the eastern and western armies, but were defeated at the Battle of Arcadiopolis. Unable to resist, Isaac II tried to ally with the Hungarian king Béla III and make a joint attack against Bulgaria, but was deposed and blinded by his brother Alexios III Angelos. The Byzantines tried to negotiate peace but Ivan Asen demanded the return of all Bulgarian lands and the war continued. In 1196, the Byzantine army was again defeated at Serres, far to the south. Upon his return to Tarnovo, Ivan Asen was murdered by his cousin Ivanko allegedly in a plot inspired by Constantinople. Peter IV besieged Tarnovo and Ivanko fled to the Byzantine Empire, where he was made governor of Philippopolis. Peter IV was murdered less than a year after his brother's death.

=== Rise ===
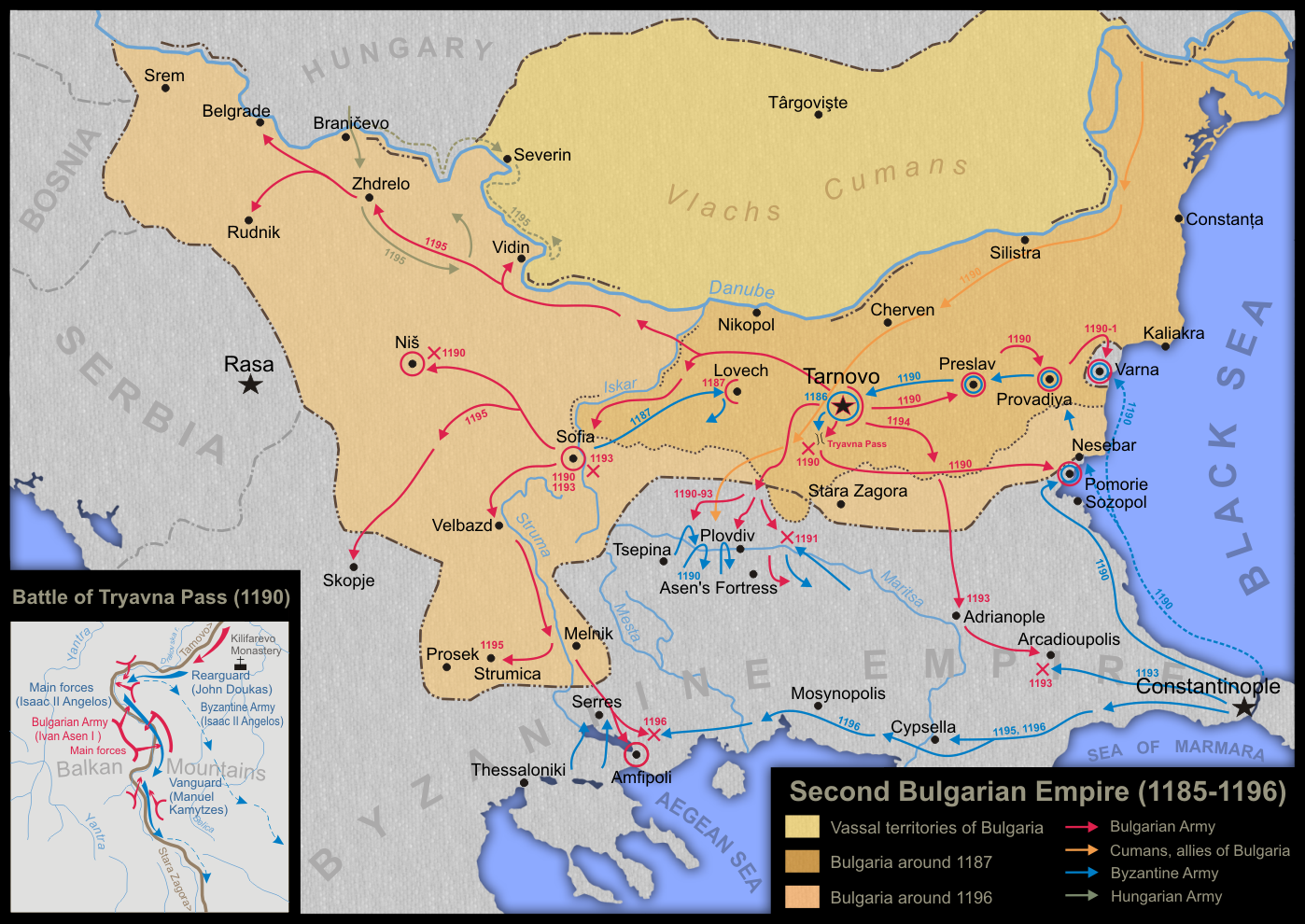
A map of the Bulgarian Empire, showing territorial extent and the campaigns between 1185 and 1197

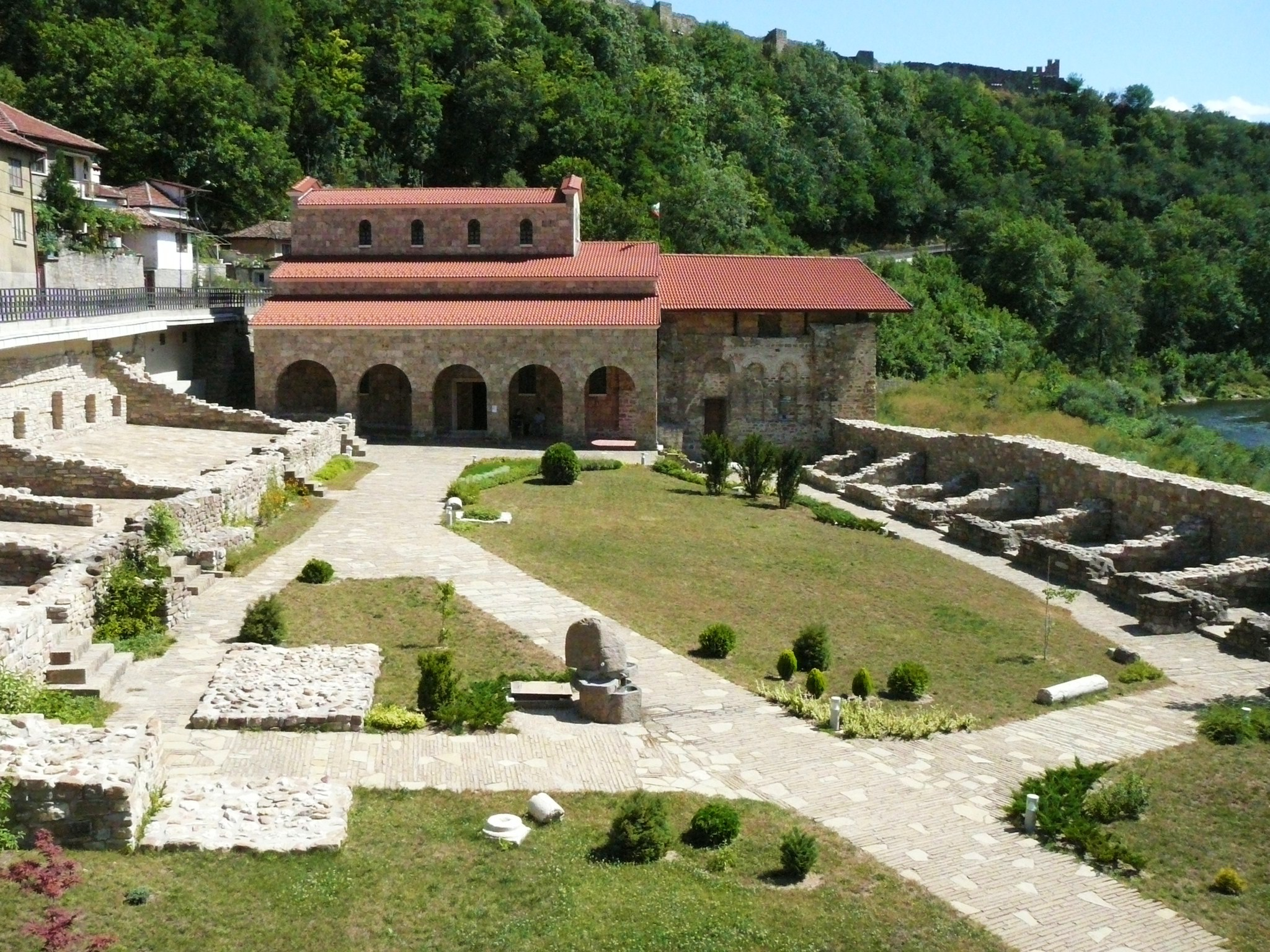
The Church of the Holy Forty Martyrs where Kaloyan was buried

The throne was succeeded by Kaloyan, Asen's and Peter IV's youngest brother. An ambitious and ruthless ruler, he wanted to gain international recognition and to complete the liberation of Bulgaria. Kaloyan also wanted revenge against the Byzantines for blinding 14,000 of emperor Samuel's soldiers. Kaloyan called himself Romanoktonos (Roman-slayer) after Basil II, who was called Bulgaroktonos (Bulgar-slayer). He quickly allied himself with his brother's murderer, Ivanko. The Byzantines killed Ivanko, but the Bulgarians took the city of Constantia. In 1201, Kaloyan captured Varna, the last Byzantine stronghold in Moesia, which was defended by a large garrison. Despite capturing the city at Easter, Kaloyan ordered every Byzantine to be thrown in the moat. He then negotiated peace with Byzantines, securing Bulgarian gains in early 1202. While the Bulgarians were occupied in the south, the Hungarian king Andrew II and his Serbian vassal Vukan had annexed Belgrade, Braničevo, and Niš, but after negotiating peace, Kaloyan turned his attention to the north-west. In 1203, the Bulgarians pushed the Serbs out of Niš, defeated the Hungarian army in several battles along the valley of the Morava river, and recaptured their former territory.

Kaloyan knew the Byzantines would never recognize his imperial title; he began negotiations with Pope Innocent III. He based the claims on his predecessors in the First Bulgarian Empire; Simeon I, Peter I, and Samuel. The Pope was willing to recognize Kaloyan as king on the condition the Bulgarian Church would submit to Rome. After lengthy negotiations in which both acted diplomatically but without changing their positions, Kaloyan was crowned king in late 1204. Archbishop Basil was proclaimed Primate. Kaloyan had no intention of submitting to that decision; he sent the Pope a letter expressing his gratitude for the Imperial title he had received and the elevation of the Bulgarian Church to a Patriarchate. Eventually the Papacy tacitly accepted the Bulgarian position regarding the Imperial title. The union between Bulgaria and Rome remained strictly official; the Bulgarians did not change their Orthodox rites and traditions.

A map showing the greatest territorial extension of the Second Bulgarian Empire during the reign of Ivan Asen II (1218–1241)

Several months before Kaloyan's coronation, the leaders of the Fourth Crusade turned on the Byzantine Empire and captured Constantinople, creating the Latin Empire. The Bulgarians tried to establish friendly relations with the Latins but were rebuffed and the Latins claimed their lands despite Papal recognition. Facing a common enemy, Kaloyan and the Byzantine aristocracy in Thrace made an alliance and the latter promised they would accept Kaloyan as their emperor. The decisive battle between the Bulgarian army and the Crusaders took place on 14 April 1205, at Adrianople, at which the Latins were defeated and their emperor Baldwin I was captured. The battle was a blow to the newly founded Latin Empire, which descended into chaos. After their victory, the Bulgarians retook most of Thrace, including the important city of Philippopolis. The unexpected Bulgarian successes caused the Byzantine nobility to plot against Kaloyan and ally themselves with the Latins. The plot in Tarnovo was quickly discovered; Kaloyan made brutal reprisals against the Byzantines in Thrace. The campaign against the Latins also continued; in 1206, the Bulgarians were victorious at the battle of Rusion and conquered a number of towns in Eastern Thrace. The following year, Boniface I, the King of Salonica, was killed in battle, but Kaloyan was murdered before he could begin the assault on the capital.

Kaloyan was succeeded by his cousin Boril, who tried to pursue his predecessor's policies but did not have his capability. His army was defeated by the Latins at Philippopolis, reversing most of Kaloyan's gains. Boril failed to maintain the integrity of the empire; his brother Strez took most of Macedonia for himself, Alexius Slav seceded his territory in the Rhodopes; in return for help suppressing a major rebellion in 1211, Boril was forced to cede Belgrade and Braničevo to Hungary. A campaign against Serbia in 1214 also ended in defeat.

In the year 6738, I, Ivan Asen, in Christ God faithful tsar and autocrat of the Bulgarians, son of the old tsar Asen, built from the foundations and adorned with paintings the whole of this most honorable church in the name of the Holy Forty Martyrs with whose help in the twelfth year of my reign, in the year this temple was being painted, I waged war in Romania, defeated the Greek army, and captured the Lord Emperor Theodore Comnenus himself and all his boyars. And I conquered all the land from Adrianople to Durazzo, Greek, Serbia and Albanian alike. The Franks hold only the cities in the vicinity of Constantinople itself. But even they [these cities] are under the authority of my empire since they have no other emperor but me, and only thanks to me do they survive, for thus God has decreed.

—Tarnovo inscription of Ivan Asen II in the Church of the Holy Forty Martyrs on the aftermath of the battle of Klokotnitsa.

As a result of the growing discontent with his policy, Boril was overthrown in 1218 by Ivan Asen II, son of Ivan Asen I, who had lived in exile after Kaloyan's death. After his coronation, Ivan Asen II arranged a wedding with Anna Maria, daughter of the Hungarian king Andrew II, and received the captured cities Belgrade and Braničevo as a dowry. He then signed an alliance with Theodore Komnenos, ruler of the most powerful Byzantine successor state, the Despotate of Epirus. With his northern border secured by the treaty, Theodore Komnenos conquered Salonica, greatly reducing the size of the Latin Empire. In 1225, Theodore proclaimed himself emperor. By 1228, the situation for the Latins became desperate; they entered into negotiations with Bulgaria, promising a marriage between the under-age emperor Baldwin II and Ivan Asen II's daughter Helena. This marriage would have made the Bulgarian emperor a regent in Constantinople, but in the meantime the Latins offered the regency to the French nobleman John of Brienne. Concerned with the actions of the Bulgarians, while marching on Constantinople in 1230, Theodore Komnenos invaded Bulgaria with a huge army. Surprised, Ivan Asen II gathered a small force and moved to the south to engage them. Instead of a banner, he used the peace treaty with Theodore's oath and seal stuck on his spear and won a major victory in the Battle of Klokotnitsa. Theodore Komnenos was captured along with his whole court and most of the surviving troops. Ivan Asen II released all ordinary soldiers and marched on the Epirote–controlled territories, where all cities and towns from Adrianople to Durazzo on the Adriatic Sea surrendered and recognized his rule. Theodore's brother Michael II Komnenos Doukas was allowed to rule in Salonica over the southern areas of the despotate as a Bulgarian vassal. It is possible Serbia accepted Bulgarian suzerainty at that time to counter the threat from Catholic Hungary.

In 1231, when John of Brienne arrived in Constantinople, Ivan Asen II allied with the Nicaean Empire against the Latins. After the Nicaeans recognized the Bulgarian Patriarchate in 1235, Ivan Asen II broke his union with the Papacy. The joint campaign against the Latins was successful, but they failed to capture Constantinople. With John of Brienne's death two years later, Ivan Asen II—who could have again become a regent of Baldwin II—decided to end his cooperation with Nicaea. His decision was further based on the assumption that after an allied success, Constantinople would again have become the centre of a restored Byzantine Empire, with the Nicaean dynasty as a ruling house. The Bulgarian–Latin cooperation was short-lived; Ivan Asen II remained at peace with his southern neighbours until the end of his reign. Shortly before his death in 1241, Ivan Asen II defeated part of the Mongol army returning to the east after a devastating attack on Poland and Hungary.

=== Decline ===
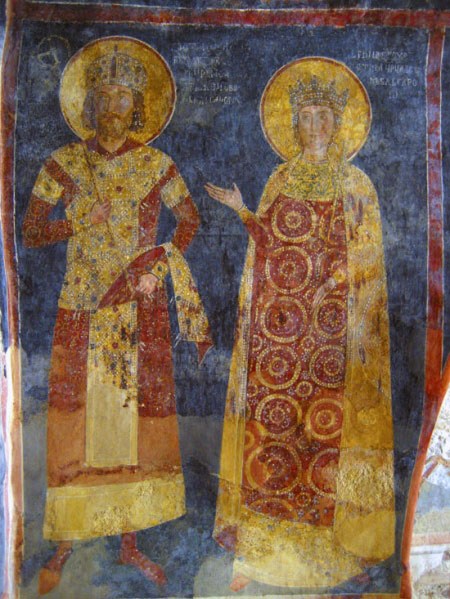
Emperor Constantine Tikh and his first wife Irene, fresco from the Boyana Church

Ivan Asen II was succeeded by his seven-year-old son Kaliman I. Despite the initial success against the Mongols, the regency of the new emperor decided to avoid further raids and chose to pay them tribute instead. The lack of a strong monarch and increasing rivalries among the nobility caused Bulgaria to rapidly decline. Its main rival Nicaea avoided Mongol raids and gained power in the Balkans. After Kaliman I's death in 1246 at the age of twelve, the throne was succeeded by several short-reigned rulers. The weakness of the new government was exposed when the Nicaean army conquered large areas in southern Thrace, the Rhodopes, and Macedonia—including Adrianople, Tsepina, Stanimaka, Melnik, Serres, Skopje, and Ohrid—meeting little resistance. The Hungarians also exploited Bulgarian weakness, occupying Belgrade and Braničevo. The Bulgarians reacted as late as 1253, invading Serbia and regaining the Rhodopes the following year. However, Michael II Asen's indecisiveness allowed the Nicaeans to regain all of their lost territory, with the exception of Tsepina. In 1255, the Bulgarians quickly regained Macedonia, whose Bulgarian population preferred the rule of Tarnovo to that of the Nicaeans. All gains were lost in 1256, after the Bulgarian representative Rostislav Mikhailovich betrayed his cause and reaffirmed Nicaean control over the disputed areas. This major setback cost the emperor's life and led to a period of instability and civil war between several claimants to the throne until 1257, when the boyar of Skopje Constantine Tikh emerged as a victor.

The new emperor had to deal with multiple foreign threats. In 1257, the Latins attacked and seized Messembria but could not hold the town. More serious was the situation to the north-west, where the Hungarians supported Rostislav, the self-proclaimed Emperor of Bulgaria in Vidin. In 1260, Constantine Tikh recovered Vidin and occupied the Severin Banat, but the next year a Hungarian counterattack forced the Bulgarians to retreat to Tarnovo, restoring Vidin to Rostislav. The city was soon controlled by the Bulgarian noble Jacob Svetoslav, but by 1266 he also styled himself emperor. The restoration of the Byzantine Empire under the ambitious Michael VIII Palaiologos further worsened Bulgaria's situation. A major Byzantine invasion in 1263 led to the loss of the coastal towns Messembria and Anchialus, and several cities in Thrace—including Philippopolis. Unable to effectively resist, Constantine Tikh organized a joint Bulgarian–Mongol campaign, but after ravaging Thrace the Mongols returned north of the Danube. The emperor became crippled after a hunting accident in the early 1260s, and fell under the influence of his wife Maria Palaiologina, whose constant intrigues fueled divisions among the nobility.

Bulgarian Empire (in dark green) and Southeastern Europe in 1265

Constant Mongol raids, economic difficulties, and the emperor's illness led to a massive popular uprising in the north-east in 1277. The rebel army, led by the swineherd Ivaylo, defeated the Mongols twice, greatly boosting Ivaylo's popularity. Ivaylo then turned on and defeated the regular army under the command of Constantine Tikh. He personally killed the emperor, claiming the latter did nothing to defend his honour. Fearing a revolt in Byzantium, and willing to exploit the situation, the emperor Michael VIII sent an army led by Ivan Asen III, a Bulgarian pretender to the throne, but the rebels reached Tarnovo first. Constantine Tikh's widow Maria married Ivaylo and he was proclaimed emperor. After the Byzantines failed, Michael VIII turned to the Mongols, who invaded Dobrudzha and defeated Ivaylo's army, forcing him to retreat to Drastar, where he withstood a three-month siege. After his defeat, Ivaylo was betrayed by the Bulgarian nobility, who opened the gates of Tarnovo to Ivan Asen III. In early 1279, Ivaylo broke off the siege at Drastar and besieged the capital. The Byzantines sent a 10,000-strong army to relieve Ivan Asen III, but suffered defeat by Ivaylo at the battle of Devina. Another army of 5,000 had a similar fate, forcing Ivan Asen III to flee. Ivaylo's situation did not improve, however—after two years of constant warfare his support was diminished, the Mongols were not decisively defeated, and the nobility remained hostile. By the end of 1280, Ivaylo sought refuge with his former enemies the Mongols, who under Byzantine influence killed him. The nobility chose the powerful noble and ruler of Cherven, George I Terter, as emperor. He reigned for twelve years, bringing even stronger Mongol influence and the loss of most of the remaining lands in Thrace to the Byzantines. This period of instability and uncertainty continued until 1300, when for a few months the Mongol Chaka ruled in Tarnovo.

=== Temporary stabilization ===
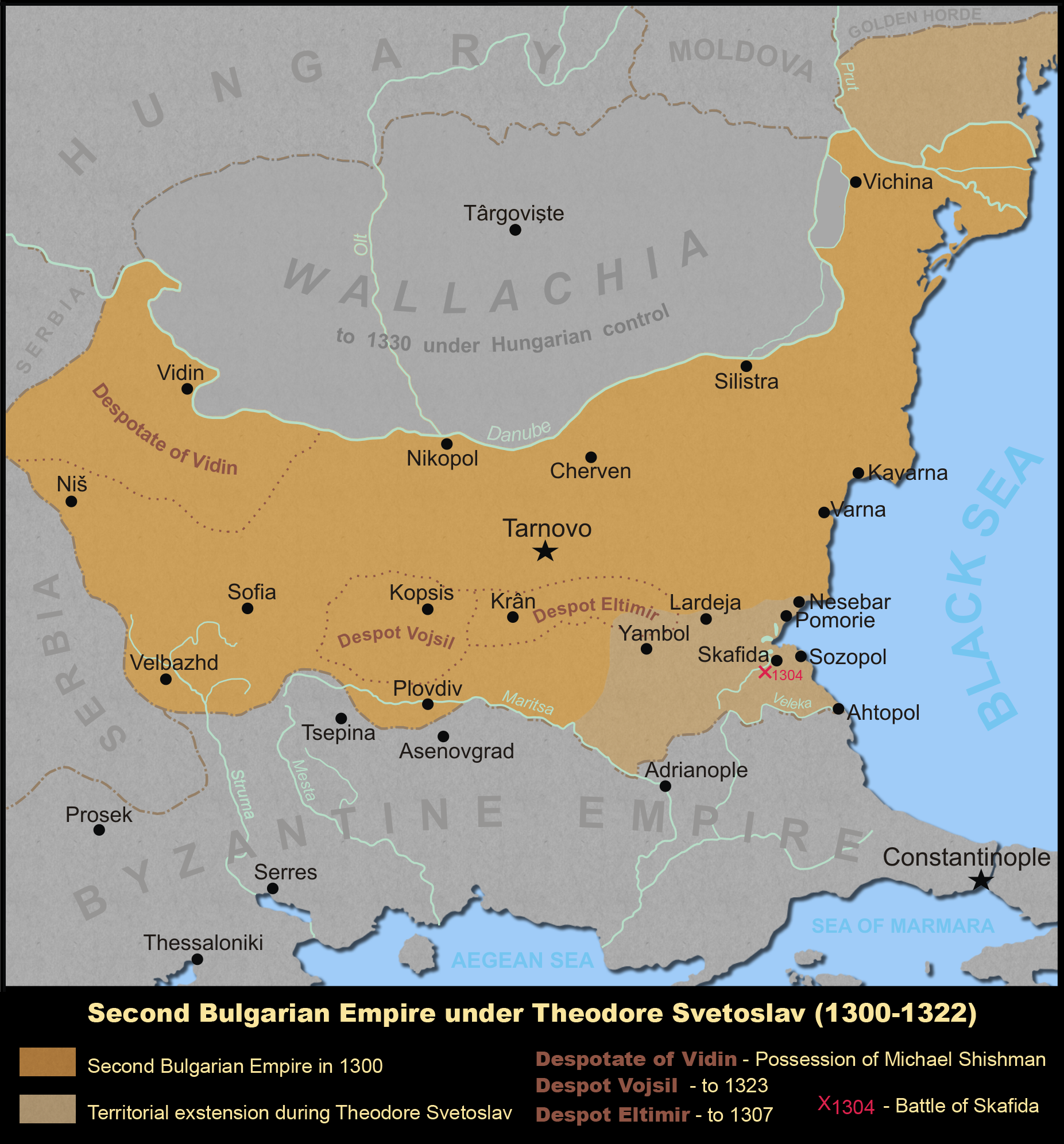
Bulgaria under Theodore Svetoslav (1300-1322)

In 1300, Theodore Svetoslav, George I's eldest son, took advantage of a civil war in the Golden Horde, overthrew Chaka, and presented his head to the Mongol khan Toqta. This brought an end to Mongol interference in Bulgarian domestic affairs and secured Southern Bessarabia as far as Bolgrad to Bulgaria. The new emperor began to rebuild the country's economy, subdued many of the semi-independent nobles, and executed as traitors those he held responsible for assisting the Mongols, including Patriarch Joachim III. The Byzantines, interested in Bulgaria's continuous instability, supported pretenders Michael and Radoslav with their armies, but were defeated by Theodore Svetoslav's uncle Aldimir, the despot of Kran. Between 1303 and 1304, the Bulgarians launched several campaigns and retook many towns in north-eastern Thrace. The Byzantines tried to counter the Bulgarian advance but suffered a major defeat in the battle of Skafida. Unable to change the status quo, they were forced to make peace with Bulgaria in 1307, acknowledging Bulgarian gains. Theodore Svetoslav spent the rest of his reign in peace with his neighbors. He maintained cordial relations with Serbia and in 1318, its king Stephen Milutin, paid a visit to Tarnovo. The years of peace brought economic prosperity and boosted commerce; Bulgaria became a major exporter of agricultural commodities, especially wheat.

During the early 1320s, tensions between Bulgaria and the Byzantines rose as the latter descended into a civil war and the new emperor George II Terter seized Philippopolis. In the confusion following George II's unexpected death in 1322 without leaving a successor, the Byzantines recaptured the city and other Bulgarian-seized towns in northern Thrace. The energetic despot of Vidin, Michael Shishman, was elected emperor the next year; he immediately turned on the Byzantine emperor Andronikos III Palaiologos, regaining the lost lands. In late 1324, the two monarchs signed a peace treaty, strengthened by a marriage between the Bulgarian ruler and Theodora Palaiologina. Michael Shishman divorced his Serbian wife Anna Neda, causing a deterioration of relations with Serbia. This change of political course is explained by the rapid growth of Serbian power and its penetration into Macedonia.

The Bulgarians and the Byzantines agreed to a joint campaign against Serbia, but it took five years until the differences and tensions between Bulgaria and Byzantium were overcome. Michael Shishman gathered 15,000 troops and invaded Serbia. He engaged the Serbian king Stephen Dečanski, who commanded an approximately equal force, near the border town of Velbazhd. The two rulers, both expecting reinforcements, agreed to a one-day truce but when a Catalan detachment under the king's son Stephen Dušan arrived, the Serbs broke their word. The Bulgarians were defeated in the ensuing Battle of Velbazhd and their emperor perished. Despite their victory, the Serbs did not risk an invasion of Bulgaria and the two sides agreed to peace. As a result, Ivan Stephen, the eldest son of the dead emperor by his Serbian wife, succeeded him in Tarnovo and was deposed after a brief rule. Bulgaria did not lose territory but could not stop the Serbian expansion in Macedonia.

After the disaster at Velbazhd, the Byzantines attacked Bulgaria and seized a number of towns and castles in northern Thrace. Their success ended in 1332, when the new Bulgarian emperor Ivan Alexander defeated them in the battle of Rusokastro, recovering the captured territories. In 1344, the Bulgarians entered the Byzantine civil war of 1341–47 on the side of John V Palaiologos against John VI Kantakouzenos, capturing nine towns along the Maritsa river and in the Rhodope Mountains, including Philippopolis. That acquisition marked the last significant territorial expansion of medieval Bulgaria, but also led to the first attacks on Bulgarian soil by the Ottoman Turks, who were allied with Kantakouzenos.

=== Fall ===
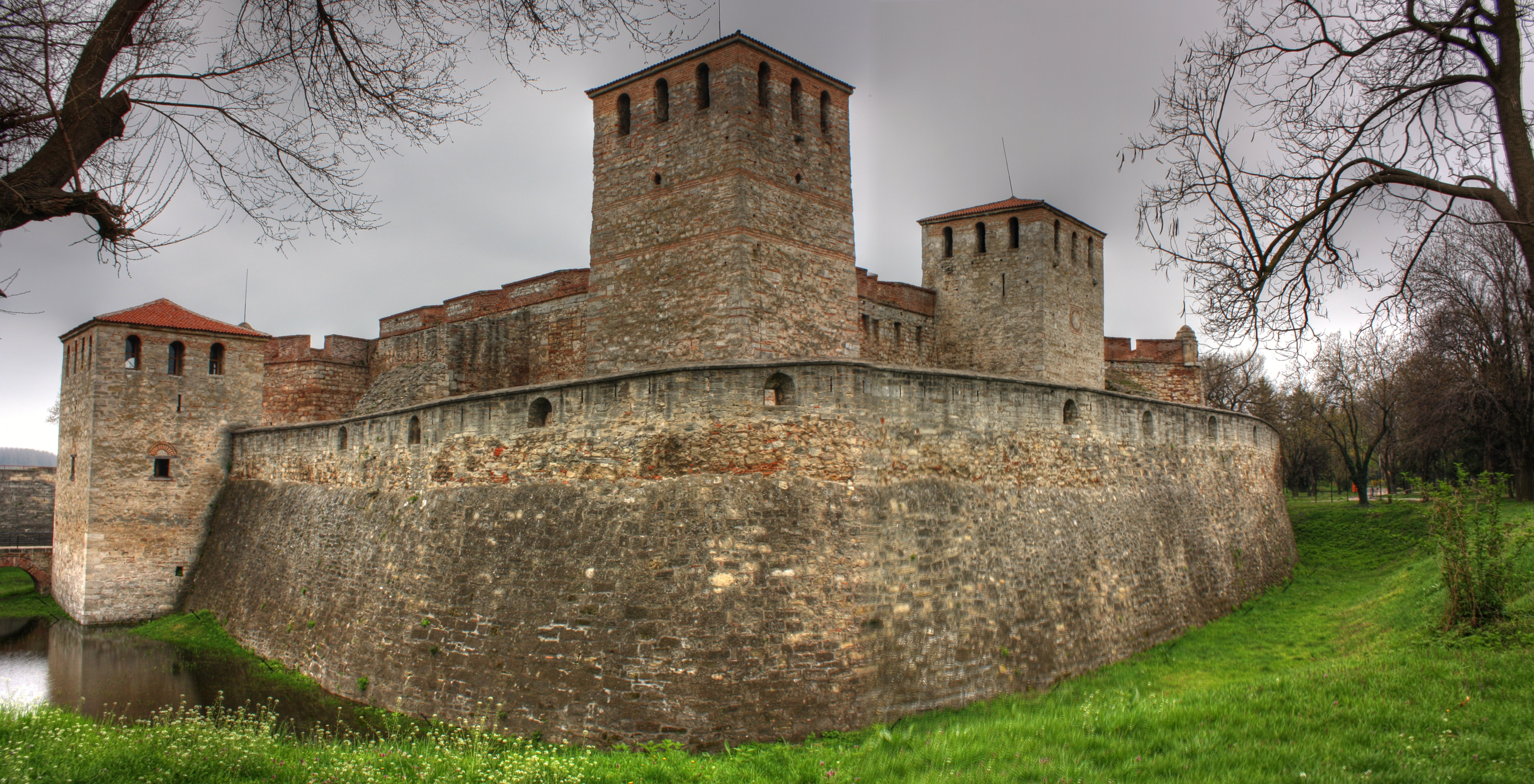
The fortress of Baba Vida in Vidin

The attempts of Ivan Alexander to fight off the Ottomans in the late 1340s and early 1350s failed after two defeats in which his eldest son and successor Michael Asen IV and his second son Ivan Asen IV may have been killed. The emperor's relations with his other son Ivan Sratsimir, who had been installed as the ruler of Vidin, deteriorated after 1349, when Ivan Alexander divorced his wife to marry Sarah-Theodora, a converted Jew. When their child Ivan Shishman was designated an heir to the throne, Ivan Sratsimir proclaimed independence.

In 1366, Ivan Alexander refused to grant passage to the Byzantine emperor John V Palaiologos, and the troops of the Savoyard crusade attacked the Bulgarian Black Sea coast. They seized Sozopolis, Messembria, Anchialus, and Emona, causing heavy casualties and unsuccessfully laying siege to Varna. The Bulgarians eventually granted passage to John V, but the lost towns were handed over to the Byzantines. To the north-west, the Hungarians attacked and occupied Vidin in 1365. Ivan Alexander reconquered his province four years later, allied with his de jure vassals Dobrotitsa and Vladislav I of Wallachia. The death of Ivan Alexander in 1371 left the country irrevocably divided between Ivan Shishman in Tarnovo, Ivan Sratsimir in Vidin, and Dobrotitsa in Karvuna. The 14th century German traveler Johann Schiltberger described these lands as follows:

I was in three regions, and all three were called Bulgaria. The first Bulgaria extends there, where you pass from Hungary through the Iron Gate. Its capital is called Vidin. The other Bulgaria lies opposite Wallachia, and its capital is called Tarnovo. The third Bulgaria is there, where the Danube flows into the sea. Its capital is called Kaliakra.

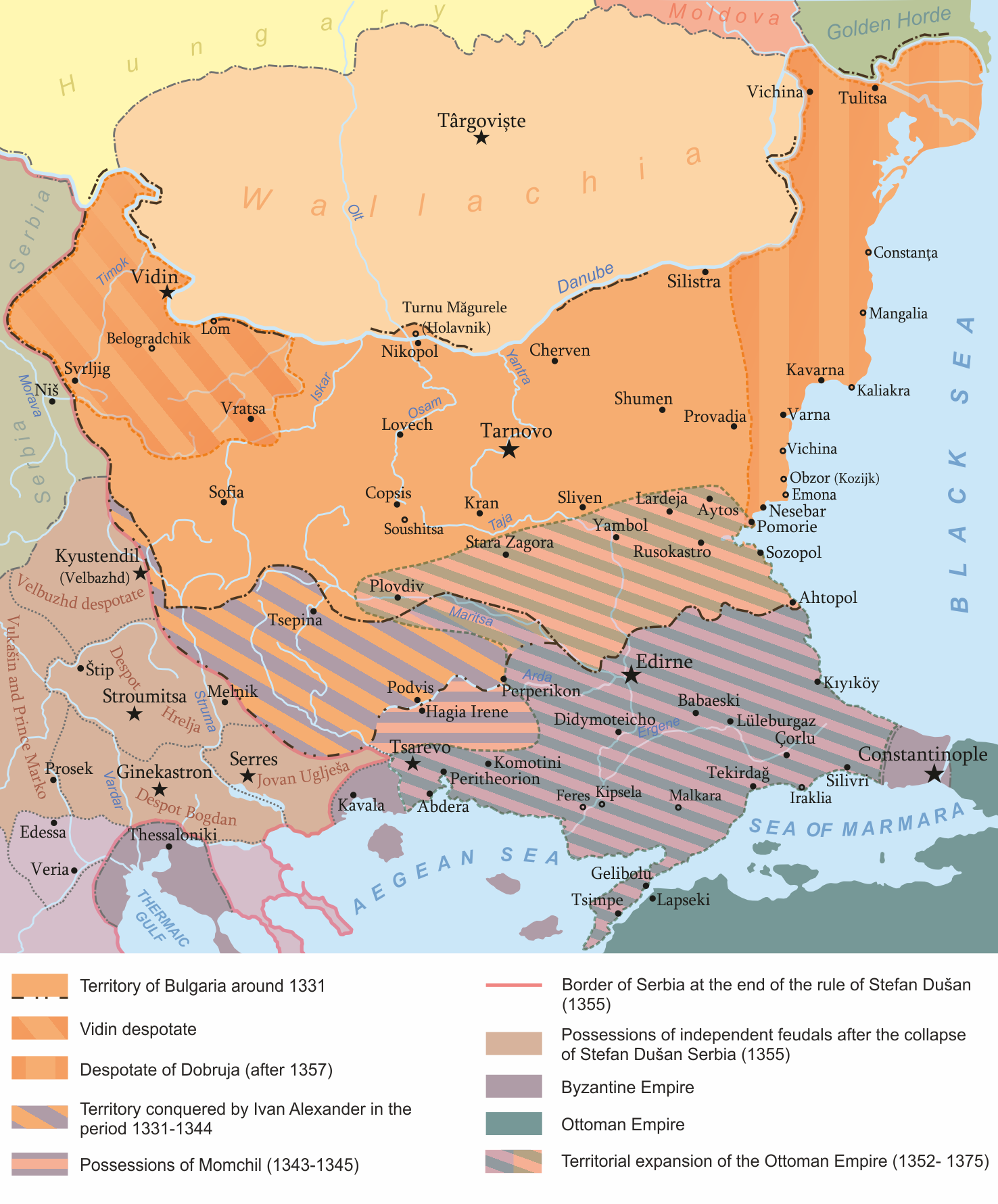
Second Bulgarian Empire, 1331–1371

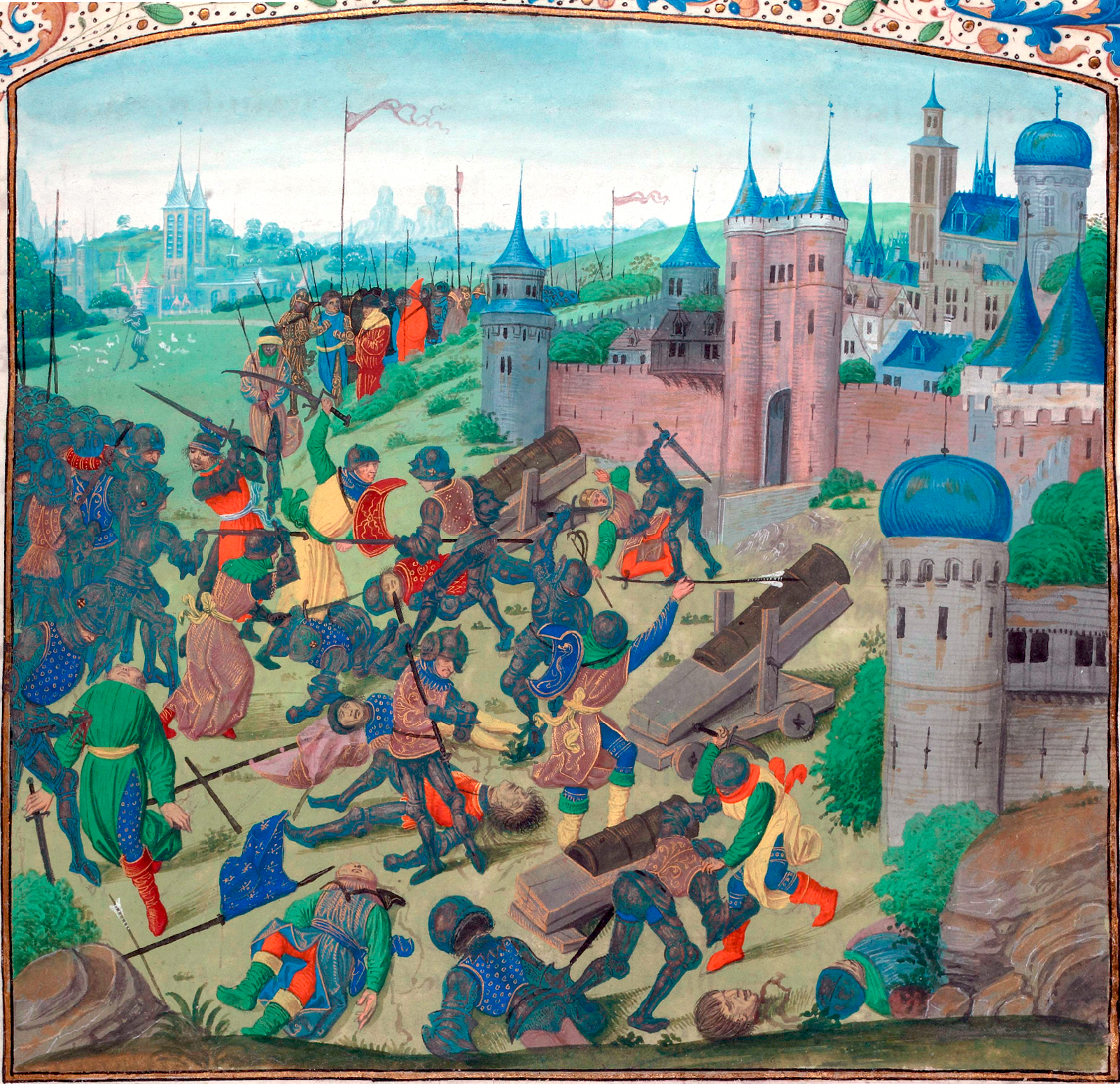
The defeat of the anti-Ottoman coalition in the Battle of Nicopolis in 1396 was the final blow leading to the fall of the Bulgarian Empire.

On 26 September 1371, the Ottomans defeated a large Christian army led by the Serbian brothers Vukašin Mrnjavčević and Jovan Uglješa in the Battle of Chernomen. They immediately turned on Bulgaria and conquered northern Thrace, the Rhodopes, Kostenets, Ihtiman, and Samokov, effectively limiting the authority of Ivan Shishman in the lands to the north of the Balkan Mountains and the Valley of Sofia. Unable to resist, the Bulgarian monarch was forced to become an Ottoman vassal, and in return he recovered some of the lost towns and secured ten years of uneasy peace.

The Ottoman raids renewed in the early 1380s, culminating in the fall of Sofia. Simultaneously, Ivan Shishman had been engaged in war against Wallachia since 1384. According to the Anonymous Bulgarian Chronicle, he killed the Wallachian voivode Dan I of Wallachia in September 1386. He also maintained uneasy relations with Ivan Sratsimir, who had broken his last ties with Tarnovo in 1371 and had separated the dioceses of Vidin from the Tarnovo Patriarchate. The two brothers did not cooperate to repel the Ottoman invasion. According to historian Konstantin Jireček, the brothers were engaged in a bitter conflict over Sofia. Ivan Shishman reneged on his vassal obligation to support the Ottomans with troops during their campaigns. Instead, he used every opportunity to participate in Christian coalitions with the Serbs and the Hungarians, provoking massive Ottoman invasions in 1388 and 1393.

Despite strong resistance, the Ottomans seized a number of important towns and fortresses in 1388, and five years later they captured Tarnovo after a three-month siege. Ivan Shishman died in 1395 when the Ottomans, led by Bayezid I, took his last fortress Nikopol. In 1396, Ivan Sratsimir joined the Crusade of the Hungarian king Sigismund, but after the Christian army was defeated in the Battle of Nicopolis the Ottomans immediately marched on Vidin and seized it, bringing an end to the medieval Bulgarian state, according to the mainstream consensus of historians. However, resistance continued under the reign of Constantine II, collaborating with his cousin Fruzhin, and they may have retained a small amount of Bulgarian Empire territory, primarily in the Tsardom of Vidin, until 1422.

== Administration, territorial division, society ==
The Second Bulgarian Empire was a hereditary monarchy ruled by a Tsar—the Bulgarian word for Emperor that originated in the 10th century during the First Bulgarian Empire. The monarchs of Bulgaria styled themselves, "In Christ the Lord Faithful Emperor and Autocrat of all Bulgarians" or variations, sometimes including "...and Romans, Greeks, or Vlachs". The term all Bulgarians was added in the 14th century following the loss of many Bulgarian-populated territories and signified that the monarch in Tarnovo was the emperor of all Bulgarian people, even those who lived beyond the country's political borders.

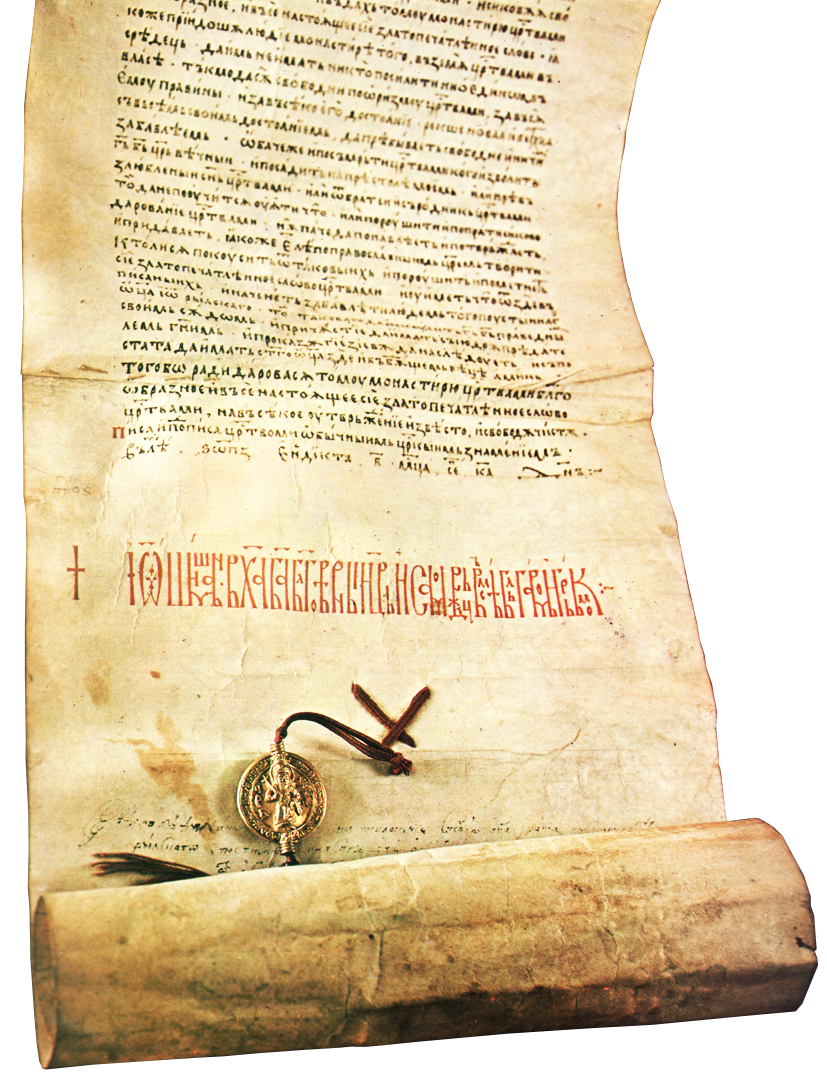
The Medieval Bulgarian royal charters, such as the Rila Charter of Ivan Shishman issued in 1378, are an important source on medieval Bulgarian society and administrative posts.

The Emperor held supreme power over secular and religious affairs in an autocracy; his personal abilities played an important role in the country's well-being. When the monarch was an infant, the government was headed by a regency that included the mother-empress, the Patriarch, and senior members of the ruling dynasty. As the processes of feudal fragmentation accelerated in the 14th century, it became customary for the monarch's sons to receive imperial titles during their father's lifetime; sons were styled co-rulers or junior emperors.

Unlike the First Empire, the administration during the Second Bulgarian Empire was heavily influenced by the Byzantine system of administration. Most of the titles of the nobility, the court, and the administration were directly adopted from their Byzantine counterparts in Byzantine Greek, or were translated into Bulgarian. There were some differences in the ranking systems between the two countries—there are few surviving sources about the precise obligations, insignia, or ceremonial affairs of the medieval Bulgarian administration. The Bolyar Council included the greater bolyars and the Patriarch; it discussed issues about external and internal policies, such as declarations of war, formations of alliances, or the signing of peace treaties. The highest-ranking administrative officials were the great logothete, who had the functions of a first minister, and the protovestiarios, who was responsible for the treasury and finance. High court titles such as despot and sebastokrator were awarded to the Emperor's relatives but were not strictly concerned with administrative functions.

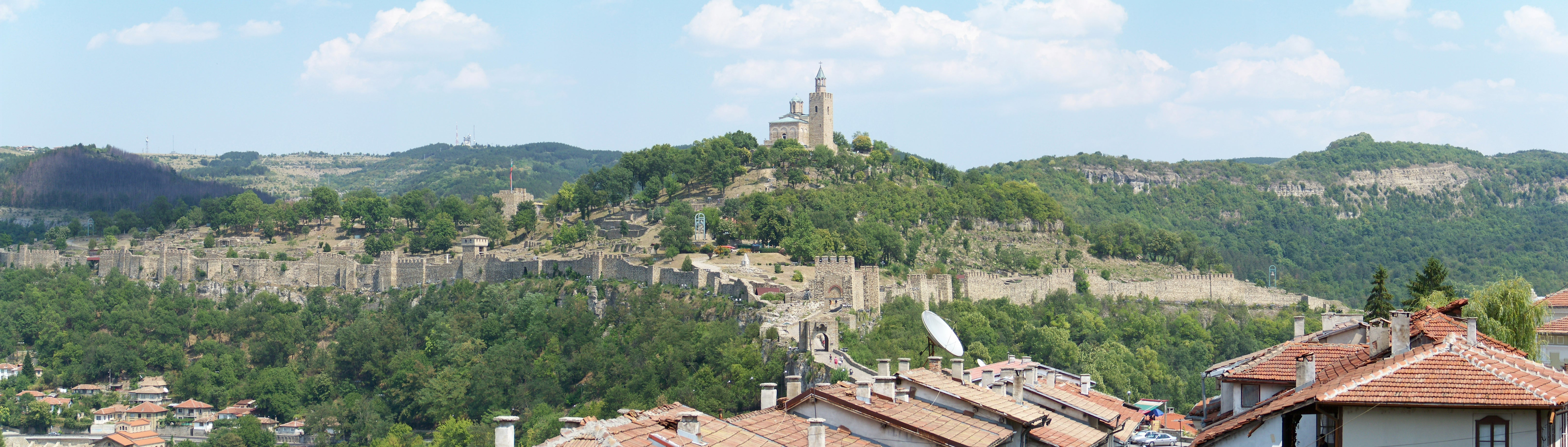
Panoramic view of Tarnovo, the capital of the Second Bulgarian Empire

The capital of the Second Bulgarian Empire was Tarnovo, which was also the centre of its own administrative unit under the direct authority of the emperor. Bulgaria was divided into provinces, whose numbers varied with the territorial evolution of the country. In surviving primary sources, the provinces were named with the Byzantine term hora or the Bulgarian terms zemya (земя), strana (страна), and oblast (област), usually named after its main city. The provincial governors were titled "duke" or kefalia — both from Byzantine dux and kephale—and were directly appointed by the emperor. The provinces were subdivided into katepanika (sing. katepanikon, from the Byzantine katepanikion), which were ruled by katepans who were subordinated to the dukes. During the reign of Ivan Asen II (1218–41), the provinces included Belgrade, Braničevo, Boruy, Adrianople, Dimotika, Skopje, Prilep, Devol, and Albania.

During the Second Empire, Bulgarian society was divided into three social classes: clergy, nobility, and peasantry. The nobility included the aristocracy: the bolyars, whose origin was the older Bulgarian boilas from the First Empire, the judges, and the "whole army". The bolyars were subdivided into greater and lesser bolyars. The former possessed large estates, which at times included tens and even hundreds of villages, and held high administrative and military posts. The peasants formed the bulk of the third class and were subordinated either under the central authorities or under local feudal lords. With time, the number of the latter increased as a result of the process of feudalization of Bulgaria. The main groups of peasants were paritsi and otrotsi. Both could own land but only the paritsi could inherit property; the latter could not, since it was provided by the feudal lords.

== Military ==
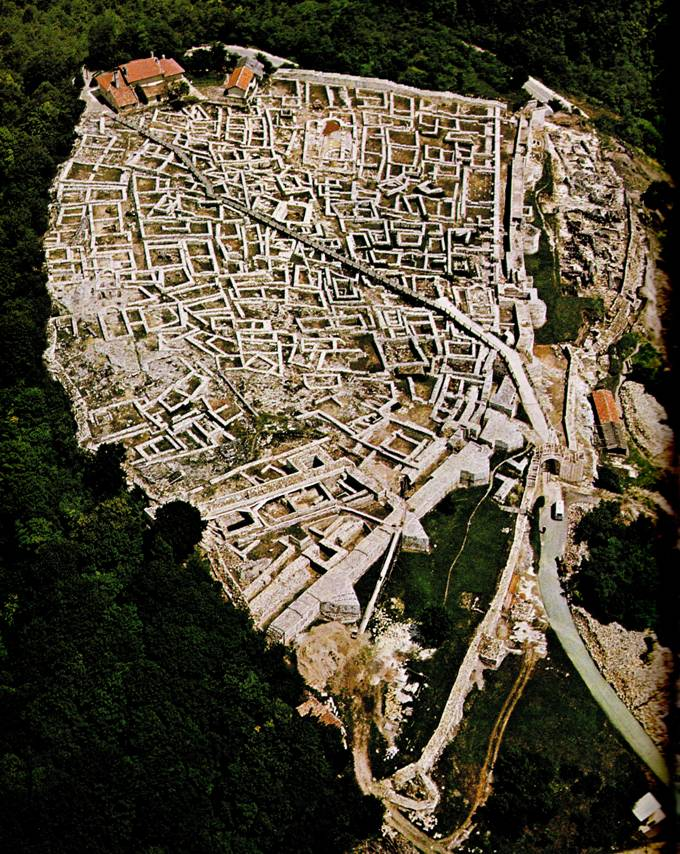
Aerial view of the Shumen fortress, an important stronghold in eastern Bulgaria

The emperor of the Second Bulgarian Empire was commander-in-chief of its army; the second-in-command was the velik (great) voivoda. The detachments of the army were led by a voivoda. The protostrator was responsible for the defence of certain regions and the recruitment of soldiers. In the late 12th century, the army numbered 40,000 men-at-arms. The country could mobilize around 100,000 men in the first decade of the 13th century; Kaloyan reportedly offered Baldwin I, the leader of the Fourth Crusade, 100,000 soldiers to help him take Constantinople. By the end of the 13th century, the military declined and the army was reduced to fewer than 10,000 men—it was recorded that Ivaylo defeated two Byzantine armies of 5,000 and 10,000 men, and that his troops were outnumbered in both cases. Military strength increased with the political stabilization of Bulgaria in the first half of the 14th century; the army numbered 11,000–15,000 troops in the 1330s. The military was well supplied with siege equipment, including battering rams, siege towers, and catapults.

The Bulgarian army used various military tactics, relying on the experience of the soldiers and the peculiarities of the terrain. The Balkan mountains played a significant role in the military strategy and facilitated the country's defence against the strong Byzantine army. During wartime, the Bulgarians would send light cavalry to devastate the enemy lands on a broad front, pillaging villages and small towns, burning the crops, and taking people and cattle. The Bulgarian army was very mobile—for instance for four days before the Battle of Klokotnitsa, it covered a distance three times longer than the Epirote army covered in a week; in 1332, it travelled 230 km (140 miles) in five days.

Inside the fortress [Sofia] there is a large and elite army, its soldiers are heavily built, moustached and look war-hardened, but are used to consume wine and rakia—in a word, jolly fellows.

— Ottoman commander Lala Shahin on the garrison of Sofia.

Bulgaria maintained extensive lines of fortresses to protect the country, with the capital Tarnovo in the centre. To the north were lines along both banks of the Danube river. To the south were three lines; the first along the Balkan mountains, the second along Vitosha, northern Rhodope mountains and Sakar mountain, the third along the valley of the river Arda. To the west, a line ran along the valley of the river South Morava.

During the Second Empire, foreign and mercenary soldiers became an important part of the Bulgarian army and its tactics. Since the beginning of the rebellion of Asen and Peter, the light, mobile Cuman cavalry was used effectively against the Byzantines and later the Crusaders. Kaloyan used 14,000 cavalrymen in the Battle of Adrianople. The Cuman leaders entered the ranks of the Bulgarian nobility; some of them received high military or administrative posts in the state. In the 14th century, the Bulgarian army increasingly relied on foreign mercenaries, which included Western knights, Mongols, Ossetians, or Wallachians. Both Michael III Shishman and Ivan Alexander had a 3,000-strong Mongol cavalry detachment in their armies. In the 1350s, emperor Ivan Alexander hired Ottoman bands, as did the Byzantine Emperor. Russians were also hired as mercenaries.

== Economy ==
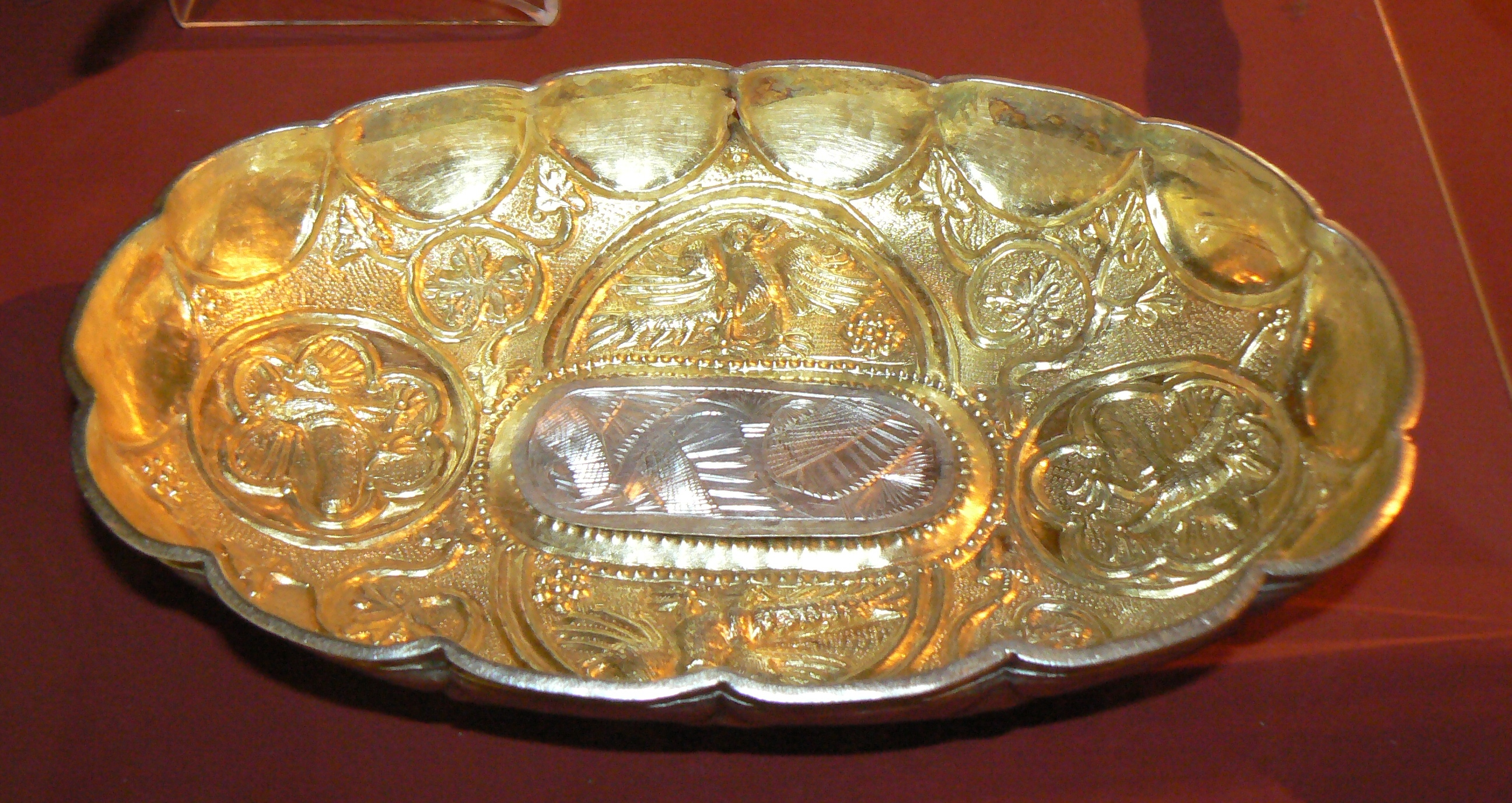
A silver vessel from the 14th century Nikopol treasure

The economy of the Second Bulgarian Empire was based on agriculture, mining, traditional crafts, and trade. Agriculture and livestock breeding remained the mainstays of the Bulgarian economy between the 12th and 14th centuries. Moesia, Zagore, and Dobrudzha were known for rich harvests of grain, including high quality wheat. Production of wheat, barley, and millet was also developed in most regions of Thrace. The main wine-producing areas were Thrace, the Black Sea coast, and the valleys of the Struma and Vardar rivers in Macedonia. Production of vegetables, orchards, and grapes became increasingly important since the beginning of the 13th century. The existence of large forests and pastures was favorable for livestock breeding, mainly in the mountainous and semi-mountainous regions of the country. Sericulture and especially apiculture were well developed. Honey and wax from Zagore were the best-quality bee products in the Byzantine markets and were highly praised. The forests produced wood for cutting (бранища); there were also fenced forests (забели), in which wood-cutting was banned.

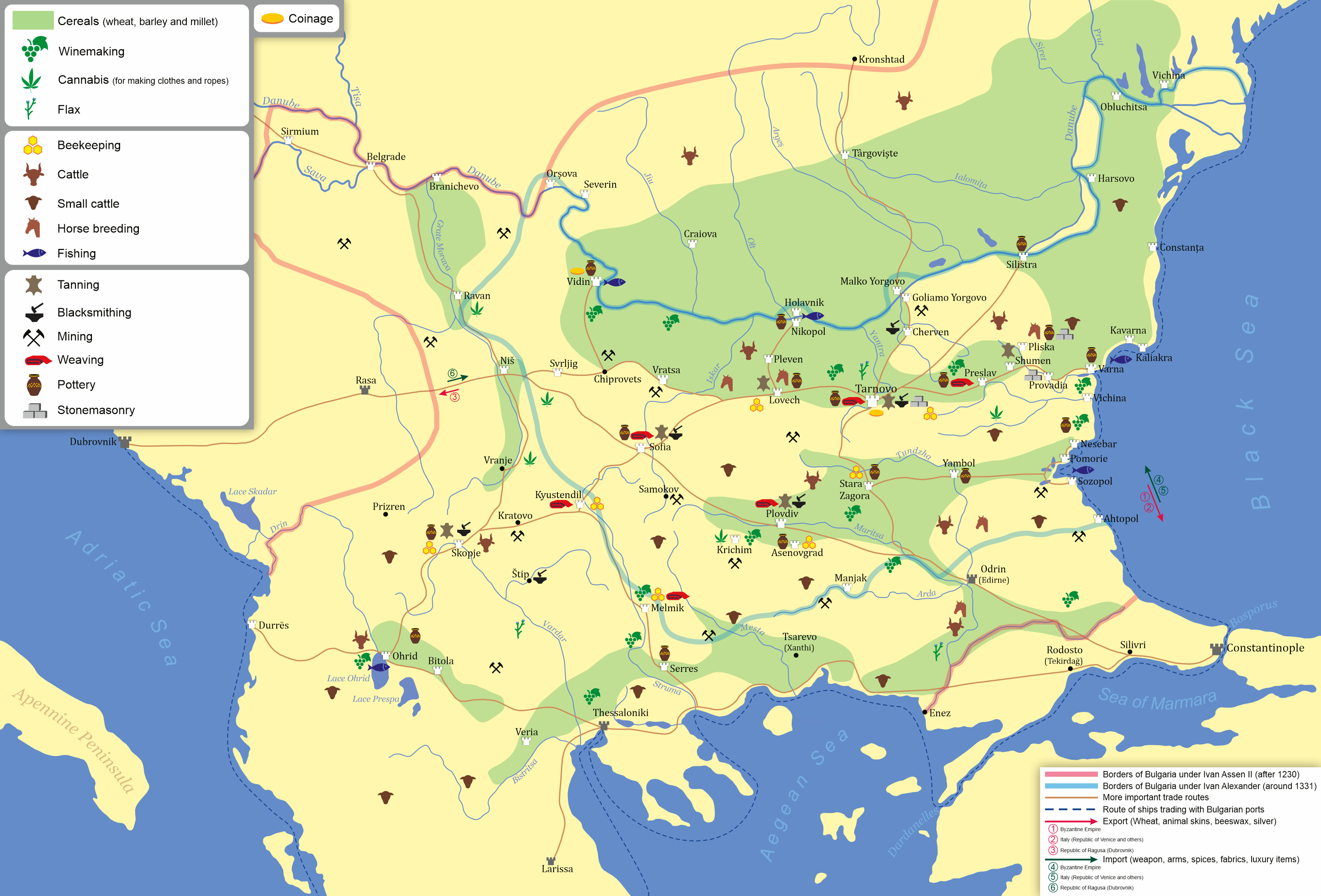
Economy of the Second Bulgarian Empire

The increase in the number of towns gave strong impetus to handicrafts, metallurgy, and mining. Processing of crops was traditional; products included bread, cheese, butter, and wine. Salt was extracted from the lagoon near Anchialus. Leathermaking, shoemaking, carpentry, and weaving were prominent crafts. Varna was renowned for the processing of fox fur, which was used for production of luxurious clothes. According to Western European sources, there was an abundance of silk in Bulgaria. The Picardian knight Robert de Clari said that in the dowry of the Bulgarian princess Maria, " ... there was not a single horse that was not covered in red silk fabric, which was so long that dragged for seven or eight steps after each horse. And despite they travelled through mud and bad roads, none of the silk fabrics was torn—everything was preserved in grace and nobility." There were blacksmiths, ironmongers, and engineers who developed catapults, battering rams, and other siege equipment, which was extensively used in the beginning of the 13th century. Metalworking was developed in western Bulgaria—Chiprovtsi, Velbazhd, and Sofia, as well in Tarnovo and Messembria to the east.

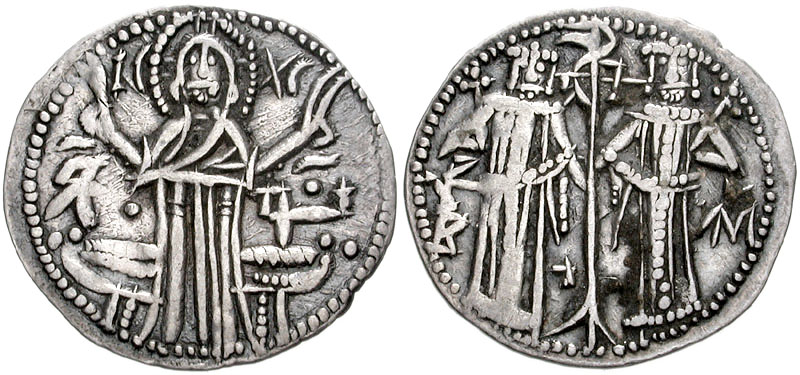
Coin depicting Ivan Alexander with one of his sons, co-emperor Michael Asen IV (right)

Monetary circulation and minting steadily increased throughout the period of the Second Bulgarian Empire, reaching their climax during the reign of Ivan Alexander of Bulgaria (reigned 1331–1371). Along with his recognition by the Pope, emperor Kaloyan (r. 1197–1207) acquired the right to mint coins. Well-organized mints and engraving workshops were set up in the mid-13th century, producing copper, billon, and silver coinage. The reform was initiated by Constantine Tikh Asen (r. 1257–1277) and led to a stabilization of the monetary market in Bulgaria. The Uprising of Ivaylo and the pillage raids of the Mongols in the late 13th century destabilized the coinage, resulting in a tenfold decrease of minting activities. With the stabilization of the empire since 1300, Bulgarian monarchs issued an increased number of coins, including silver ones, but were able to secure the market with domestic coins after the 1330s. The erosion of the central authorities on the eve of the Ottoman invasion gave rise to primitive, anonymous, and crudely forged counterfeit coins. Along with the Bulgarian coinage, coins from the Byzantine Empire, Latin Empire, Venice, Serbia, the Golden Horde, and the small Balkan principalities were widely used. Due to the increase of production, there was a tendency to limit the circulation of foreign coins by the second half of the 14th century. Coins were minted by some independent or semi-independent Bulgarian lords, such as Jacob Svetoslav and Dobrotitsa.

== Religion ==
=== Religious policy ===
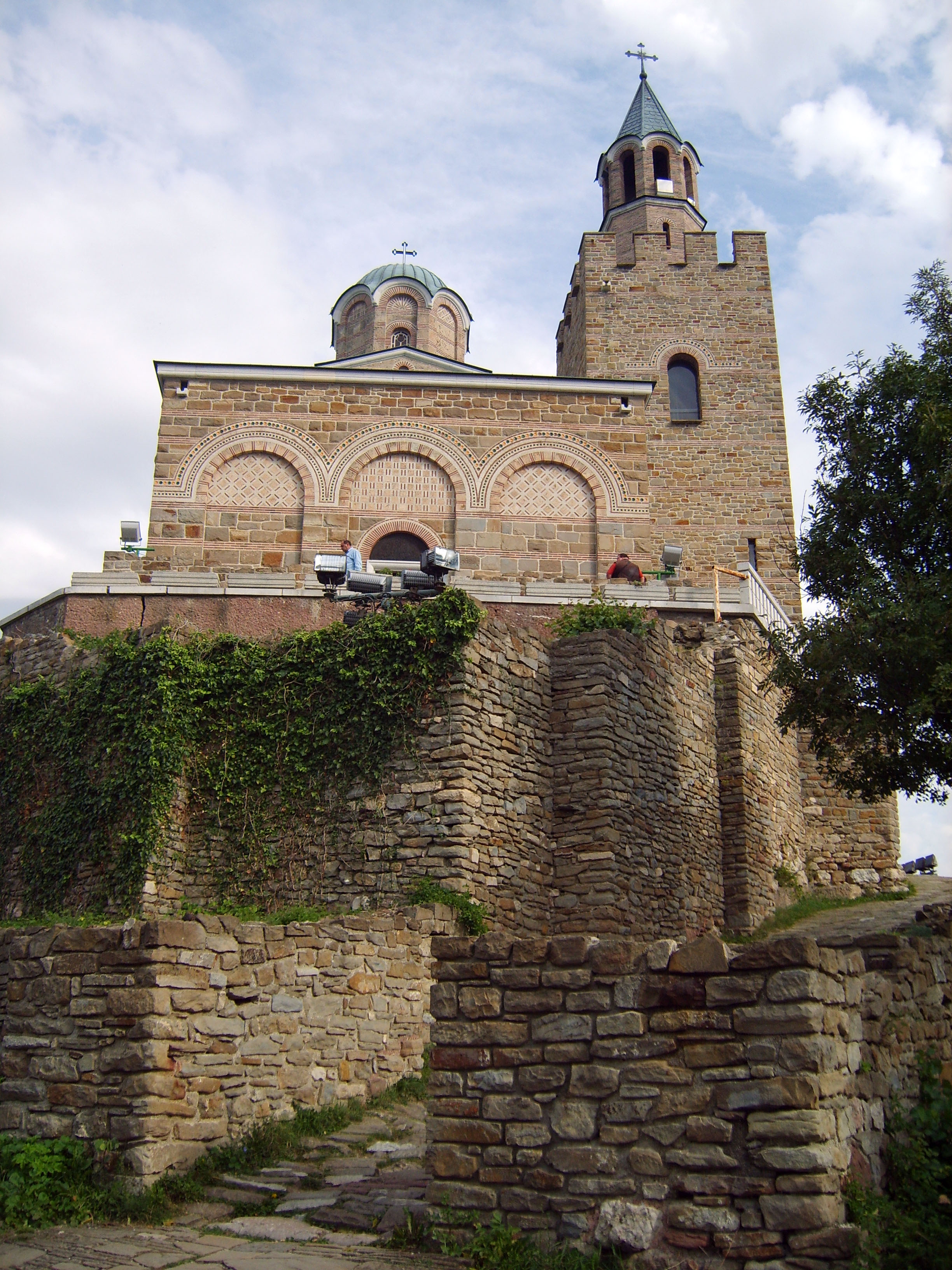
The Patriarchal Cathedral of the Holy Ascension of God in Tarnovo was the seat of the Bulgarian Orthodox Church during the Second Empire. It was part of a larger complex which accommodated the Patriarch.

Following the refoundation of Bulgaria, the recognition of the imperial title of the monarch and the restoration of the Bulgarian Patriarchate became the priority of the Bulgarian foreign policy. The continuous state of war against the Byzantine empire urged Bulgarian rulers to turn to the Papacy. In his correspondence with Pope Innocent III, Kaloyan (r. 1197–1207) demanded imperial title and a Patriarchate, basing his claims on the heritage of the First Bulgarian Empire. In return, Kaloyan promised to accept Papal suzerainty over the Bulgarian Church. The union between Bulgaria and Rome was formalized on 7 October 1205, when Kaloyan was crowned King by a papal legate and the Archbishop Basil of Tarnovo was proclaimed Primate. In a letter to the Pope, Basil styled himself Patriarch, against which Innocent III did not argue. Just like Boris I (r. 852–889) three centuries earlier, Kaloyan pursued a strictly political agenda in his negotiations with the Papacy, without sincere intentions to convert to Roman Catholicism. The union with Rome lasted until 1235 and did not affect the Bulgarian church, which continued its practices of Eastern Orthodox canons and rites.

The ambition of Bulgaria to become the religious centre of the Orthodox world had a prominent place in the Second Empire's state doctrine. After the fall of Constantinople to the knights of the Fourth Crusade in 1204, Tarnovo became for a time the main centre of Orthodoxy. The Bulgarian emperors were zealously collecting relics of Christian saints to boost the prestige of their capital. The official recognition of the restored Bulgarian Patriarchate at the Council of Lampsacus in 1235 was a major step in that direction and gave rise to the concept of Tarnovo as a "Second Constantinople". The Patriarchate vigorously opposed the papal initiative to reunite the Orthodox Church with Rome; he criticized the Patriarchate of Constantinople and the Byzantine emperor for their apparent willingness to make concessions at the Second Council of Lyon in 1272–74. Patriarch Ignatius was called "pillar of Orthodoxy". Envoys were sent to the Patriarch of Jerusalem to negotiate an anti-Byzantine alliance, which included the other two Eastern Patriarchs, but the mission achieved nothing.

Disputes with the Patriarchate of Constantinople over the legitimacy of the Bulgarian Patriarchate intensified in the 14th century. In 1355, the Ecumenical patriarch Callistus I tried to assert his supremacy over the Bulgarian church and claimed that under the provisions of the Council of Lampsacus it remained subordinated and had to pay annual tribute to Constantinople. These claims were not supported by authentic documents and the Bulgarian religious authorities ignored them.

The structure of the Bulgarian Patriarchate followed the traditions of the First Empire. The head of the Church was the Patriarch of Bulgaria, who was a member of the State Council (Sinklit) and was at times a regent. The patriarch was assisted by a Synod comprising bishops, high-ranking clerics, and sometimes representatives of secular authorities. The Bulgarian Church strictly followed official state policy—Patriarch Joachim III was executed for treason because of suspected links with the Mongols. The territorial extent of the Bulgarian Patriarchate varied according to territorial changes. At its height under the reign of Ivan Asen II (r. 1218–41), it consisted of 14 dioceses; Preslav, Cherven, Lovech, Sofia, Ovech, Drastar, Vidin, Serres, Philippi, Messembria, Braničevo, Belgrade, Niš, and Velbazhd; and the sees of Tarnovo and Ohrid.

=== Hesychasm ===
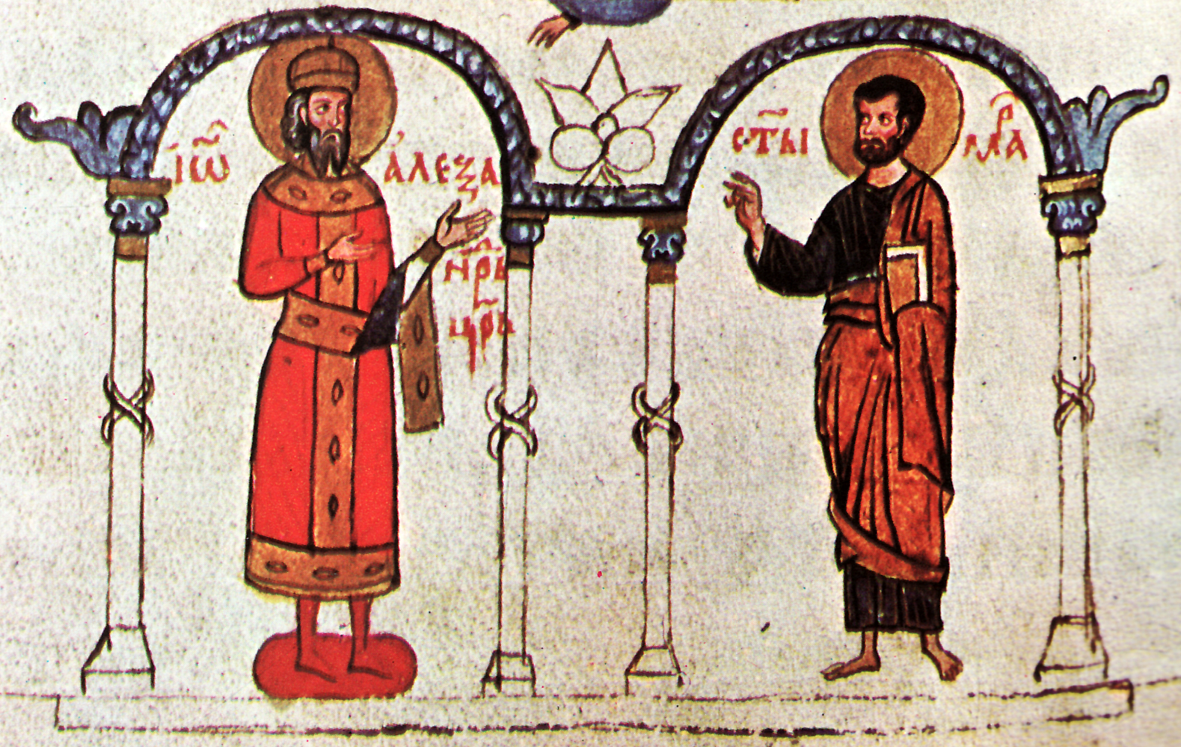
A depiction of emperor Ivan Alexander, patron of Hesychasm

Hesychasm (from Greek "stillness, rest, quiet, silence") is an eremitic tradition of prayer in the Eastern Orthodox Church that flourished in the Balkans during the 14th century. A mystical movement, Hesychasm preached a technique of mental prayer that, when repeated with proper breathing, might enable one to see the divine light. Emperor Ivan Alexander (r. 1331–71) was impressed by the practice of Hesychasm; he became a patron of Hesychastic monks. In 1335, he gave refuge to Gregory of Sinai and provided funds for the construction of a monastery near Paroria in the Strandzha Mountains in the southeast of the country; it attracted clerics from Bulgaria, Byzantium, and Serbia. Hesychasm established itself as the dominant ideology of the Bulgarian Orthodox Church with the work of the disciple of Gregory of Sinai. Gregory's disciple Theodosius of Tarnovo translated his writing into Bulgarian and reached his peak during the tenure of the last medieval Bulgarian patriarch Euthymius of Tarnovo (1375–94). Theodosius founded the Kilifarevo Monastery near Tarnovo, which became the new Hesychastic and literary centre of the country. Hesychastic intellectuals maintained regular connections with each other regardless of their nationalities, which significantly affected the cultural and religious exchange in the Balkans.

=== Bogomilism and other heresies ===
Bogomilism, a Gnostic, dualistic sect, was founded in the 10th century during the First Bulgarian Empire. It later spread throughout the Balkans and flourished after the fall of Bulgaria under Byzantine rule. The Eastern Orthodox Church considered the Bogomils, who preached civil disobedience that was particularly alarming for the state authorities, heretics.

Bogomilism saw a major resurge in Bulgaria as a result of the military and political setbacks during the reign of Boril (r. 1207–18). The emperor took swift, decisive measures to suppress the Bogomils; on 11 February 1211 he presided over the first anti-Bogomil synod in Bulgaria, which was held in Tarnovo. During the discussions, the Bogomils were exposed; those who did not return to Orthodoxy were exiled. Despite the extant union with the Roman Catholic Church, the synod followed strictly the canons of the Orthodox Church. In the specially dedicated Book of Boril, the monarch was described as "Orthodox emperor" and the Synod of Tarnovo was added to the list of Orthodox synods. As a result of Boril's actions, the influence of the Bogomils was greatly reduced but was not eradicated.

Many heretical movements, including Adamites and Barlaamism that arrived with exiles from the Byzantine Empire, established themselves in Bulgaria in the 14th century. These movements, along with the Bogomilism and Judaism, were condemned by the Council of Tarnovo in 1360, which was attended by the imperial family, the patriarch, nobles, and clerics. There are no sources about the existence of Bogomils in Bulgaria after 1360, implying the sect had already been weakened and had few followers. Persecution of the remaining Adamites and Barlaamists continued on a smaller scale, headed by Theodosius of Tarnovo and patriarch Euthymius.

== Culture ==
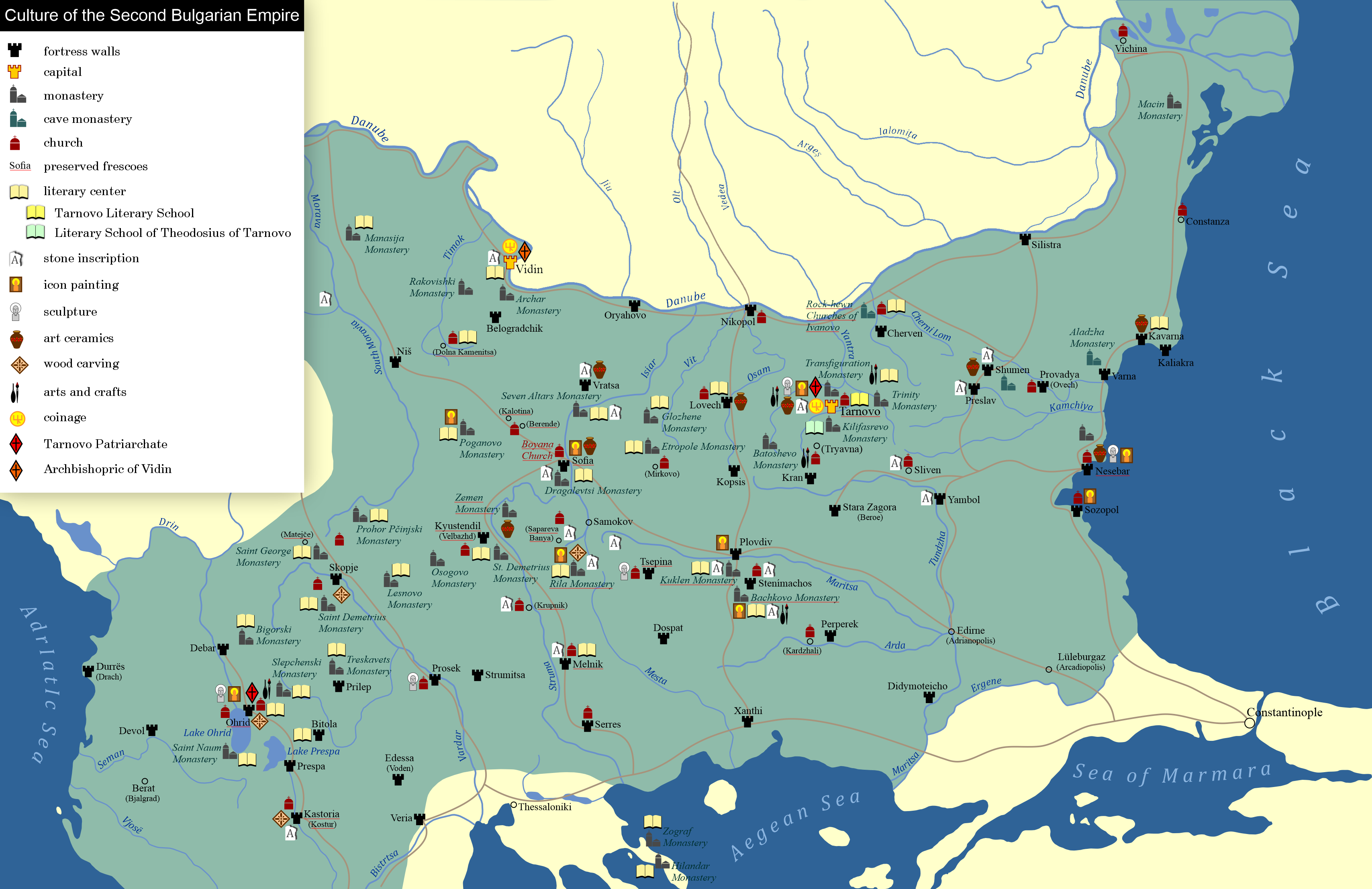
Culture of the Second Bulgarian Empire

The Second Bulgarian Empire was a centre of a thriving culture that reached its peak in the mid-to-late 14th century during the reign of Ivan Alexander (r. 1331–71). Bulgarian architecture, arts, and literature spread beyond the borders of Bulgaria into Serbia, Wallachia, Moldavia, and the Russian principalities and affected Slavic culture. Bulgaria was influenced by the contemporaneous Byzantine cultural trends. The main cultural and spiritual centre was Tarnovo, which grew into a "Second Constantinople" or "Third Rome". Bulgarian contemporaries called the city "Tsarevgrad Tarnov", the Imperial city of Tarnovo, after the Bulgarian name for Constantinople—Tsarigrad. Other important cultural hubs included Vidin, Sofia, Messembria, and a large number of monasteries throughout the country.

=== Architecture ===
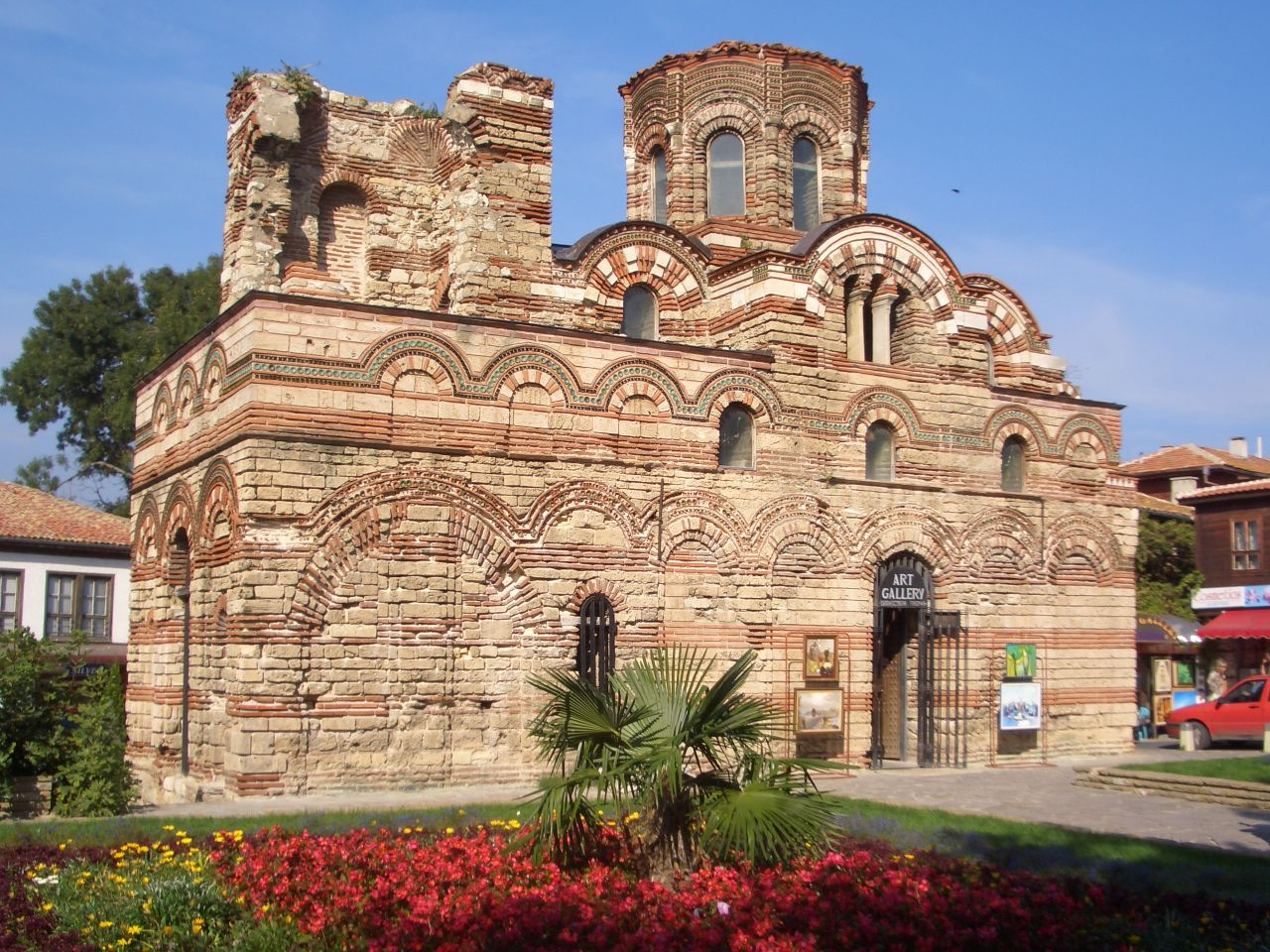
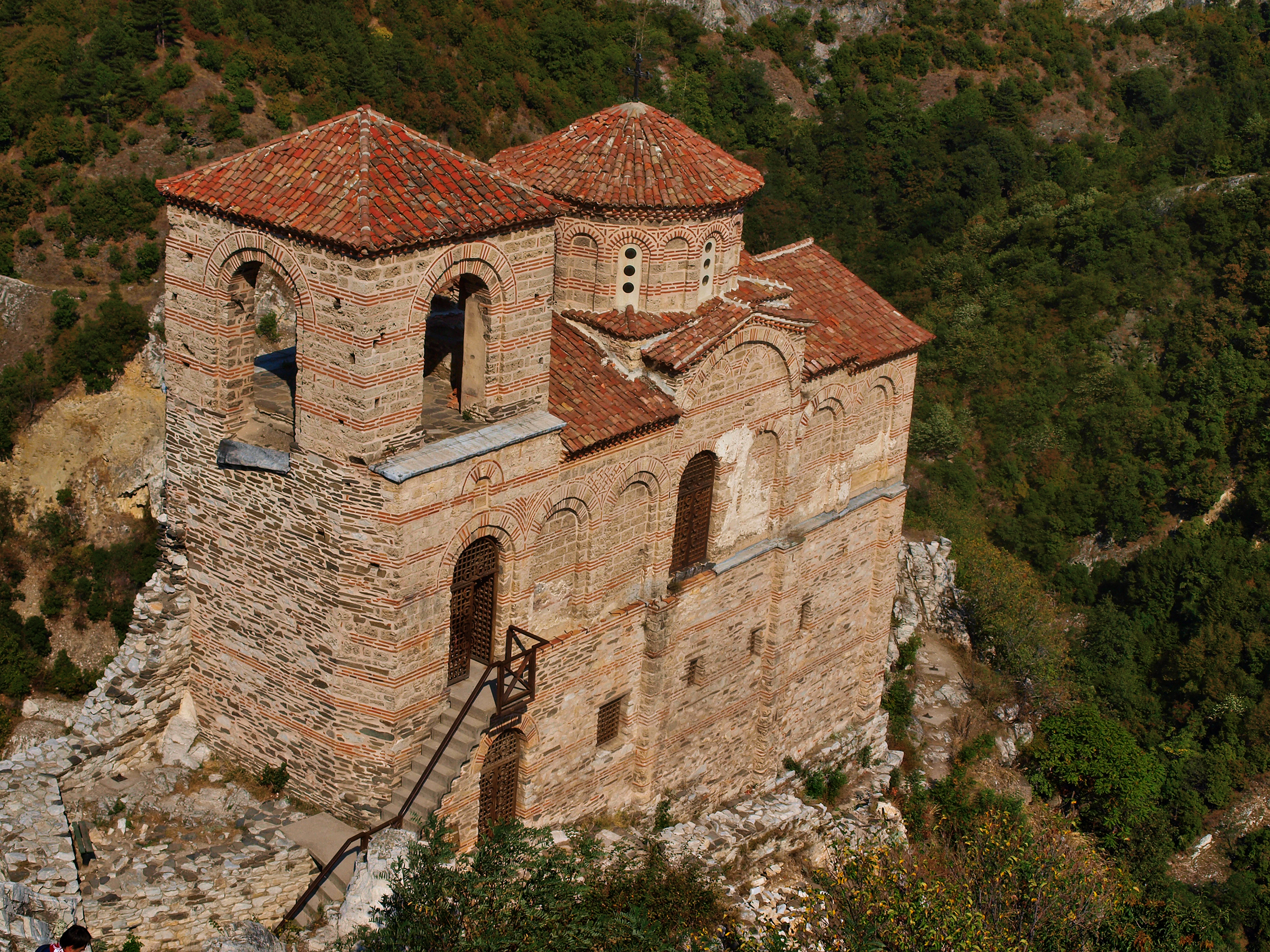
Left: The Church of Christ Pantocrator in Messembria. Right: The Church of Holy Mother of God in Asen's Fortress

The network of cities in the Second Bulgarian Empire grew in the 13th and 14th centuries; numerous new urban centres rose to prominence. The cities were usually constructed in difficult-to-access locations and generally consisted of an inner and outer town. The nobility lived in the inner town, which included the citadel, while most citizens inhabited the outer town. There were separate neighbourhoods for the nobility, craftsmen, merchants, and foreigners. The capital Tarnovo had three fortified hills—Tsarevets, Trapezitsa, and Momina Krepost, built along the meanders of the Yantra river. Several neighbourhoods along the river's banks including separate quarters for Western Europeans and Jews.

Fortresses were built on hills and plateaus—the Byzantine historian Niketas Choniates said the Bulgarian castles in the Balkan Mountains were situated "at heights above the clouds". They were built with crushed stones welded together with plaster, in contrast to the monumental ensembles in the north-east of the country dating from the period of the First Empire. The gates and the more vulnerable sections were secured with pinnacled towers; these were usually rectangular but there were also irregular, circular, oval, triangular, or horseshoe-shaped towers.

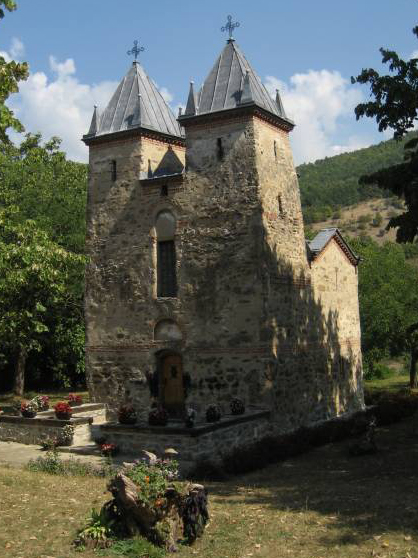
The Church of the Holy Mother of God in Donja Kamenica

Religious architecture was very prestigious; churches were among the most decorated and solid edifices in the country. Throughout the 13th and 14th centuries, basilicas were replaced with cruciform, domed churches with one or three naves. The church's exteriors had rich, decorative ornamentation with alternating belts of stone and brickwork. They were further decorated with green, yellow, and brown ceramic pieces. This feature is seen in several churches in Messembria, including the Church of St John Aliturgetos and the 14th century Church of Christ Pantocrator—which had rows of blind arches, four-leaved floral motifs, triangular ornaments, circular turquoise ceramics, and brick swastika friezes running along the external walls. Every church in Tsarevets—over 20—and many of the 17 churches in Trapezitsa were decorated with similar techniques. A rectangular belfry above the narthex is a typical characteristic of the architecture of the Tarnovo Artistic School. Some churches, such as Holy Mother of God in Asen's Fortress built during the Byzantine rule, were reconstructed with belfries.

The Church of the Holy Mother of God in Donja Kamenica in the western part of the Bulgarian Empire (in modern Serbia) is notable for its unusual architectural style. Its twin towers are topped off by sharp-pointed pyramidal elements, with additional sharp-pointed details in each of the pyramids' four corners. The towers and their design were entirely unusual and unprecedented in medieval Bulgarian church architecture and were an influence from Hungary or Transylvania.

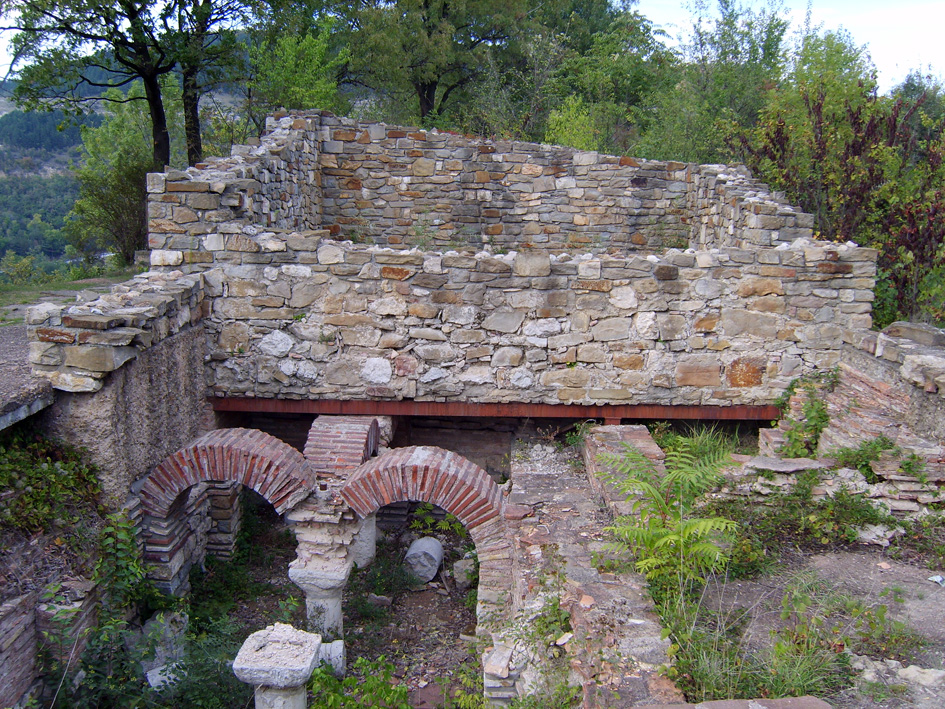
The ruins of a noble family's house in Tarnovo

The Imperial Palace in Tarnovo was initially a bolyar castle; it underwent two major reconstructions under Ivan Asen II (r. 1218–41) and Ivan Alexander (r. 1331–71). The palace had the shape of an irregular ellipse and a built-up area of 5,000 m^{2} (54,000 sq ft). The walls were up to 2 m (6.6 ft) thick. The entrance gates were guarded by round and rectangular towers; the main entrance was located in the round tower of the northern façade. The edifices were built around an inner yard with a richly decorated royal church in the middle. The Patriarch Palace was situated on the highest point of Tsarevets and dominated the city. Its plan resembled that of the Imperial Palace and occupied 3,000 m^{2} (32,000 sq ft). A four-cornered bell tower adjoined the Patriarchal Cathedral of the Holy Ascension of God. The residential and office sections were located in the southern part of the edifice.

Few examples of nobility houses have survived. To the north of the Imperial Palace, the foundations of a bolyar house from the beginning of the 13th century have been excavated. It had a Г-shaped plan and consisted of a residential area and a small, one-nave church. There were two types of mass dwellings; semi-dug houses and overground houses. The latter were constructed in cities and usually had two stories; the lower floor was built with crushed stones soldered with mud or plaster and the second was built with timber.

=== Art ===
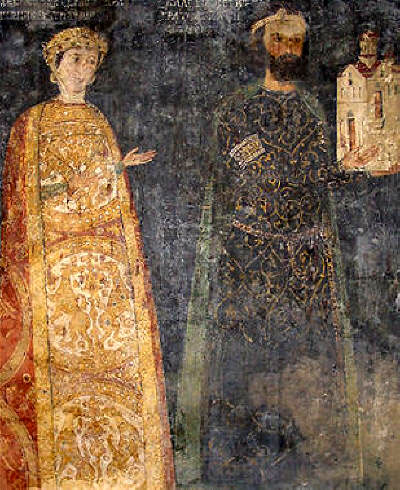
A depiction of Kaloyan and Desislava, ktitors of the Boyana Church

The mainstream of Bulgarian fine arts in the 13th and 14th centuries is known as the painting of the Tarnovo Artistic School. Despite being influenced by some tendencies of the Palaeogan Renaissance in the Byzantine Empire, Bulgarian painting had unique features; it was first classified as a separate artistic school by the French art historian André Grabar. The school's works had some degree of realism, individualized portraits, and psychological insight. Very little secular art of the Second Empire has survived. Fragments of murals depicting a richly decorated figure were uncovered during excavations in the throne room of the Imperial palace in Tarnovo. The walls of the throne room were probably decorated with images of Bulgarian emperors and empresses.

The frescoes in the Boyana Church near Sofia are an early example of the painting of the Tarnovo Artistic School, dating from 1259; they are among the most complete and best-preserved monuments of Eastern European medieval art. The portraits of the church's ktitors, Kaloyan and Desislava, and of the ruling monarch Constantine Tikh and his wife Irene dressed with ceremonial garments, are especially realistic. The Rock-hewn Churches of Ivanovo in the north-east of the country contain several churches and chapels that represent the evolution of the Bulgarian art in the 13th and 14th centuries. In paintings in churches of the first period, painted during the reign of Ivan Asen II (r. 1218–41), human figures are depicted in realistic style, with oval faces and fleshy lips. The colours of the clothing are bright, while the 14th century frescoes are in the classical style of the Palaeogan period. Both Boyana Church and the Rock-Hewn Churches of Ivanovo are included in the UNESCO World Heritage List.

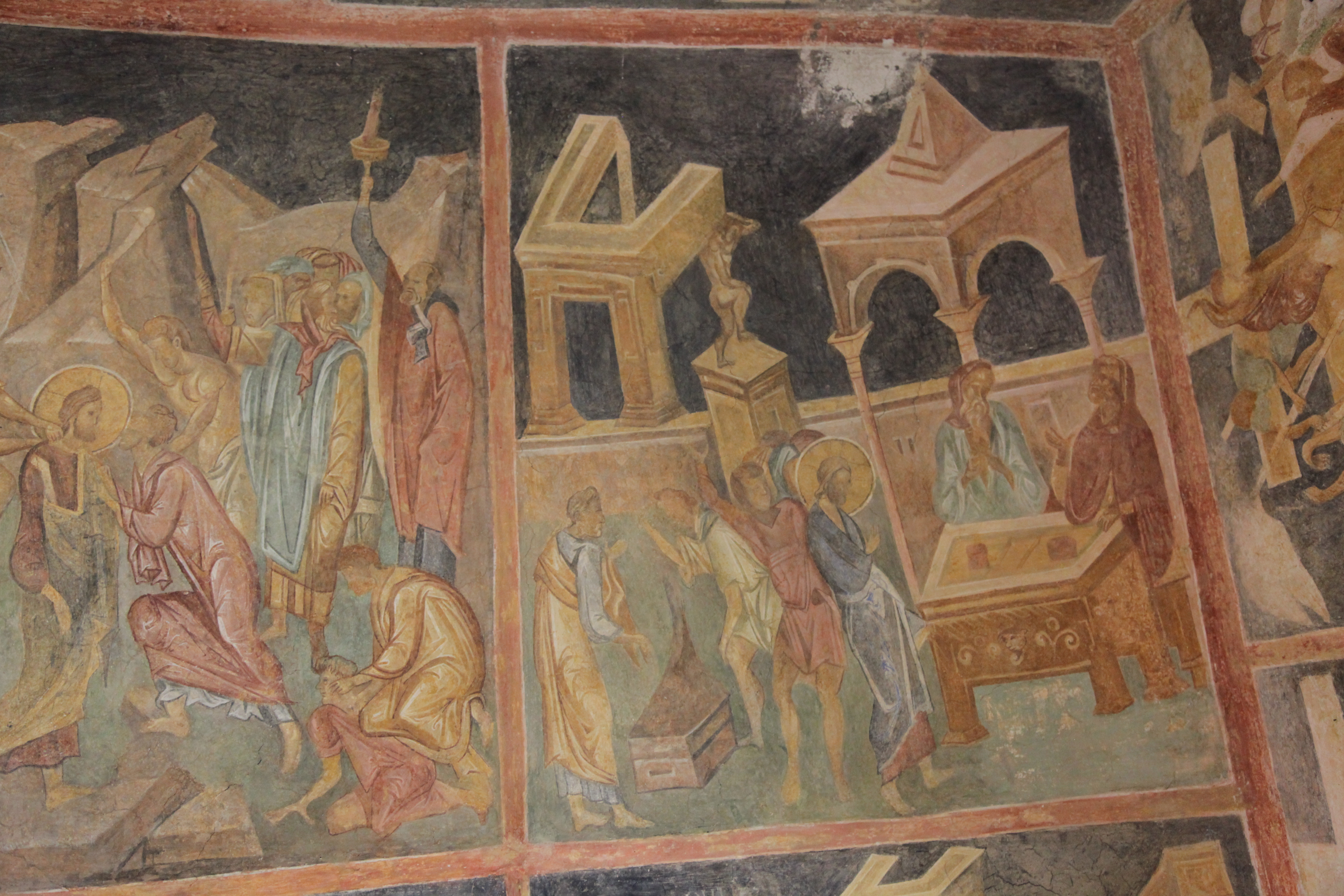
Frescos in the Rock-hewn Churches of Ivanovo

In Tarnovo, no complete painting ensemble has survived. The thirty-five scenes preserved in Holy Forty Martyrs Church feature the mild tones and sense of realism characteristic of the school. Fragments of frescoes were excavated in the ruins of the seventeen churches in Tarnovo's second fortified hill, Trapezitsa; among them were depictions of military figures wearing richly decorated garments. The palace chapel was decorated with mosaics. In western Bulgaria, local characteristics of the remnant art include archaism in the composition and unshaded tones, examples of which are found in locations including Zemen Monastery, the Church of the Holy Mother of God in Donja Kamenica, and the Church of St Peter in Berende.

Many books of the Second Bulgarian Empire contained beautifully crafted miniatures, the most notable examples being the Bulgarian translation of the Manasses Chronicle, the Tetraevangelia of Ivan Alexander, and the Tomić Psalter, which together have 554 miniatures. The style of the miniatures, which depict a variety of theological and secular events and have significant aesthetic value, was influenced by contemporaneous Byzantine works.

The Tarnovo school continued; it enriched the traditions and icon designs of the First Bulgarian Empire. Some notable icons include St Eleusa (1342) from Messembria, which is currently kept in Alexander Nevski Cathedral in Sofia, and St John of Rila (14th century), which is kept in Rila Monastery. Like the Boyana Church frescoes, St John of Rila uses realism and non-canonical design. Some of the preserved icons feature silver platings with enamel images of saints.

=== Literature ===
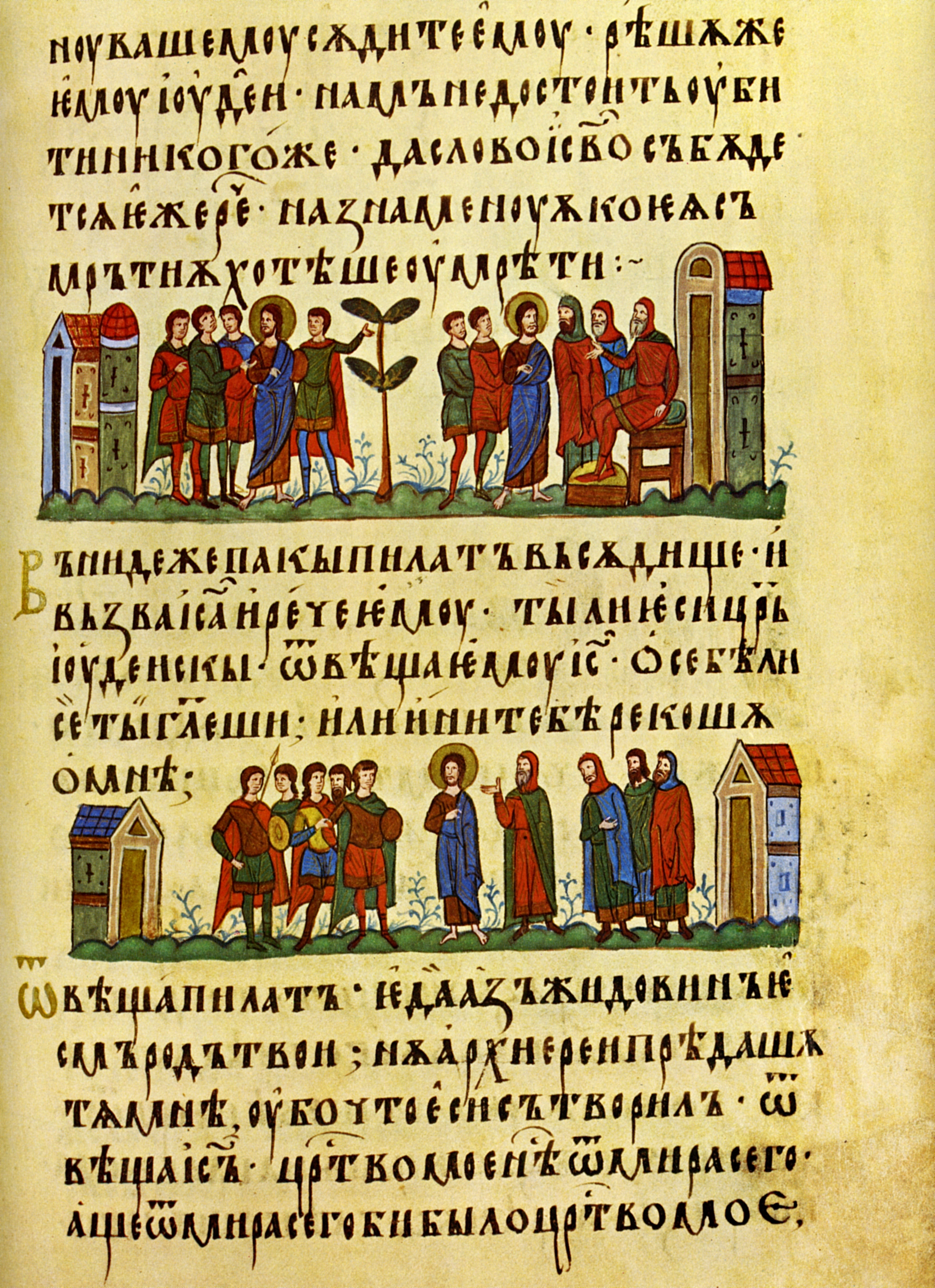
A page of the 14th-century Tetraevangelia of Ivan Alexander

The main centres of literary activity were churches and monasteries, which provided primary education in basic literacy throughout the country. Some monasteries rose to prominence by providing a more advanced education, which included study of advanced grammar; biblical, theological, and ancient texts; and Greek language. Education was available to laymen; it was not restricted to the clergy. Those who completed the advanced studies were called gramatik (граматик). Books were initially written on parchment, but paper, imported via the port of Varna, was introduced at the beginning of the 14th century. At first, paper was more expensive than parchment, but by the end of the century its cost had fallen, resulting in the production of larger numbers of books.

Few texts from the 12th and 13th centuries have survived. Notable examples from that period include the "Book of Boril", an important source for the history of the Bulgarian Empire, and the Dragan Menaion, which includes the earliest known Bulgarian hymnology and hymn tunes, as well as liturgies for Bulgarian saints John of Rila, Cyril and Methodius, and emperor Peter I. Two poems, written by a Byzantine poet in the court in Tarnovo and dedicated to the wedding of emperor Ivan Asen II and Irene Komnene Doukaina, have survived. The poet compared the emperor to the sun and described him as "more lovely than the day, the most pleasant in appearance".

During the 14th century, literary activities in the Second Empire were supported by the court, and in particular by emperor Ivan Alexander (r. 1331–71), which combined with a number of prolific scholars and clergymen, led to a remarkable literary revival known as the Tarnovo Literary School. Literature was also patronized by some nobles and wealthy citizens. Literature included translation of Greek texts and the creation of original compositions, both religious and secular. The religious books included praising epistles, passionals, hagiographies, and hymns. Secular literature included chronicles, poetry, novels and novellas, apocryphical tales, popular tales, such as The Story of Troy and Alexandria, legal works, and works on medicine and natural science.

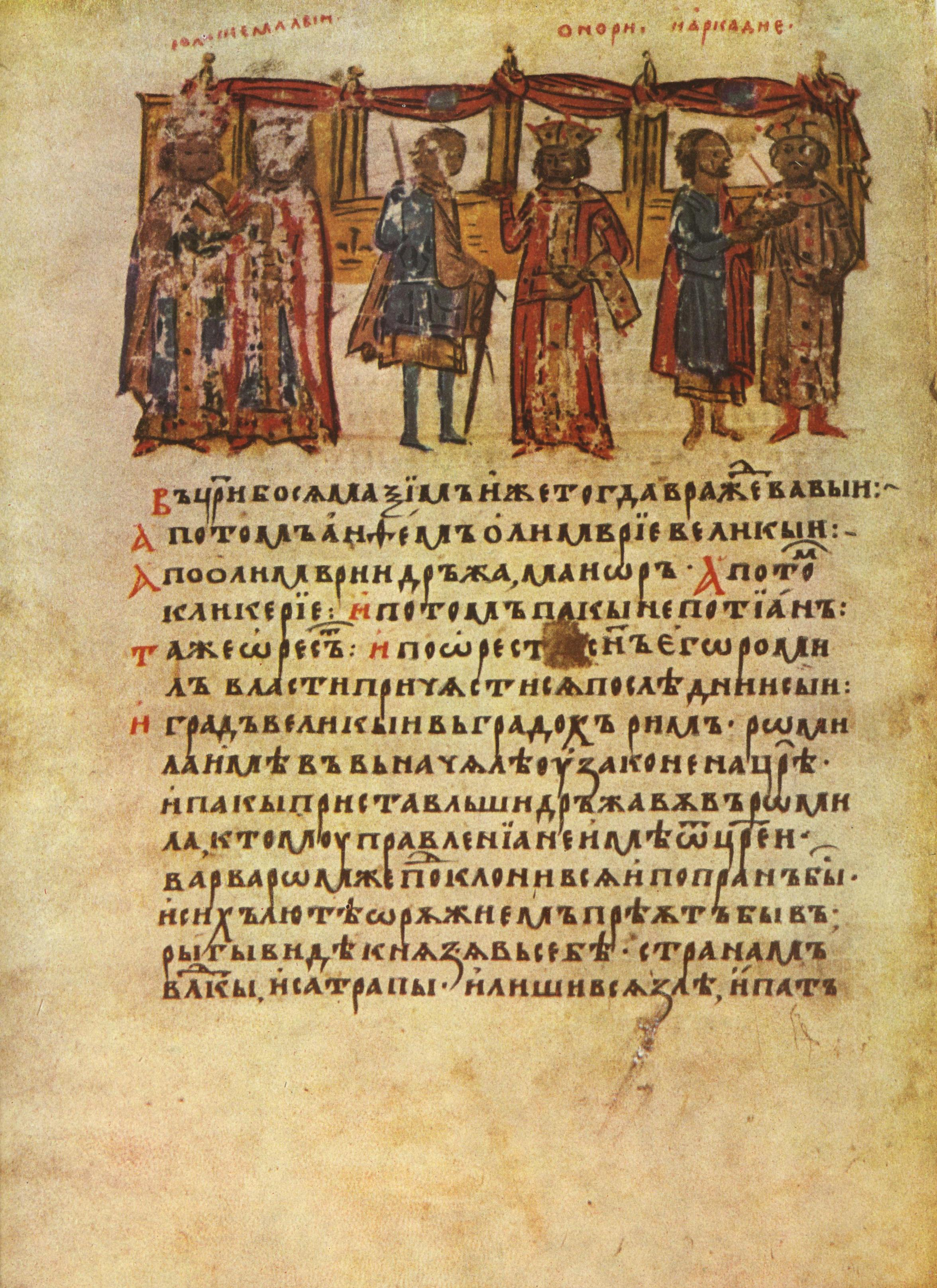
A page of the 14th-century Bulgarian translation of the Manasses Chronicle

The first notable 14th-century Bulgarian scholar was Theodosius of Tarnovo (d. 1363), who was influenced by Hesychasm and spread hesyachastic ideas in Bulgaria. His most prominent disciple was Euthymius of Tarnovo (c. 1325 – c. 1403), who was Patriarch of Bulgaria between 1375 and 1393 and founder of the Tarnovo Literary School. A prolific writer, Euthymius oversaw a major linguistic reform that standardized the spelling and grammar of the Bulgarian language. Until the reform, texts often had variations of spelling and grammar use. The model of the reform was not the contemporaneous language but that of the first golden age of Bulgarian culture in the late 9th and early 10th centuries during the First Bulgarian Empire.

The Ottoman conquest of Bulgaria forced many scholars and disciples of Euthymius to emigrate, taking their texts, ideas, and talents to other Orthodox countries—Serbia, Wallachia, Moldavia, and the Russian principalities. So many texts were taken to the Russian lands that scholars speak about a second South Slavonic influence on the Russian language. Due to this influence, a more formal and rigid standard of Church Slavonic replaced the strongly vernacularized language of the 13th and 14th centuries. A new style of writing was also introduced, which was chiefly expressed in hagiography. The close friend and associate of Euthymius, Cyprian, became the new metropolitan of Kiev and all Rus' and took Bulgarian literary models and techniques. Cyprian played a significant role in influencing the rise of Moscow as the new center of Russian culture. Gregory Tsamblak worked in Serbia and Moldavia before assuming the title of metropolitan of Kiev in the Grand Duchy of Lithuania. He wrote a number of sermons, liturgies, and hagiographies, including a "Praising epistle for Euthymius". Another important Bulgarian émigré was Constantine of Kostenets, who worked in Serbia and whose biography of despot Stefan Lazarević is described by George Ostrogorsky as "the most important historical work of old Serbian literature".

Apocryphal literature thrived in the 13th and 14th centuries, often concentrating on issues that were avoided in the official religious works. There were also many fortune-telling books that predicted events based on astrology and dreams. Some of them included political elements, such as a prophecy that an earthquake that occurred at night would confuse people, who would then treat the emperor with disdain. The authorities condemned apocryphal literature and included such titles in an index of banned books. Nonetheless, apocryphs spread in Russia; the 16th-century Russian noble Andrey Kurbsky called them "Bulgarian fables".

== See also ==
Pontic littoral's city and flags of Second Bulgarian Empire (Bulgarian rulers Shishman) on vexilographic maps by the end of the 13th – 17th centuries

- Byzantine–Bulgarian wars
- Bulgarian–Latin wars
- Bulgarian–Ottoman wars
- Bulgarian–Hungarian wars
- Bulgarian–Serbian wars
- Medieval Bulgarian royal charters
- Medieval Bulgarian army
- Medieval Bulgarian navy
- Medieval Bulgarian coinage
- White Wallachia

== Notes ==
a: Unlike the Byzantine Empire, the taxes in the First Bulgarian Empire were paid in kind.
b: Peter I (r. 927–969) was the first Bulgarian ruler who received official recognition of his imperial title by the Byzantines and enjoyed great popularity during the Byzantine rule. Two other rebel leaders were proclaimed Emperor of Bulgaria under the name Peter before Theodore.
c: The Roman and the Latin Empires were referred to by Western Europeans as "Romania". The term "Franks" (in Bulgarian фръзи, in Greek frankoi) was used by the medieval Bulgarians and Byzantines to describe the whole Catholic population of Europe and the subjects of the Latin Empire.
d: There is no information about territorial changes in the negotiations but many historians suggest that the Serbs occupied Niš at that time.
e: When there was no legitimate heir of the deceased monarch it was customary that the nobility would elect an emperor among themselves. Constantine Tikh (r. 1257–1277), George I Terter (r. 1280–1292) and Michael Shishman (r. 1323–1330) were all elected emperors by the nobility.

== Bibliography ==
- Biliarsky, Ivan (2011). Word and Power in Mediaeval Bulgaria. Leiden, Boston: Brill. ISBN 9789004191457.
- Bogdan, Ioan (1966). Contribuţii la istoriografia bulgară şi sârbă în Scrieri alese (Contributions from the Bulgarian and Serbian Historiography in Selected Writings) (in Romanian). Bucharest: Anubis.
- Cox, Eugene L. (1987). The Green Count of Savoy: Amadeus VI and Transalpine Savoy in the Fourteenth Century. Princeton, New Jersey: Princeton University Press.
- Fine, J. (1987). The Late Medieval Balkans, A Critical Survey from the Late Twelfth Century to the Ottoman Conquest. University of Michigan Press. ISBN 0-472-10079-3.
- Kazhdan, A. (1991). The Oxford Dictionary of Byzantium. New York, Oxford: Oxford University Press. ISBN 0-19-504652-8.
- Obolensky, D. (1971). The Byzantine Commonwealth: Eastern Europe, 500–1453. New York, Washington: Praeger Publishers. ISBN 0-19-504652-8.
- Vásáry, I. (2005). Cumans and Tatars: Oriental Military in the Pre-Ottoman Balkans, 1185–1365. New York: Cambridge University Press. ISBN 9780521837569.

- Андреев (Andreev), Йордан (Jordan); Лалков (Lalkov), Милчо (Milcho) (1996). Българските ханове и царе (The Bulgarian Khans and Tsars) (in Bulgarian). Велико Търново (Veliko Tarnovo): Абагар (Abagar). ISBN 954-427-216-X.
- Ангелов (Angelov), Димитър (Dimitar); Божилов (Bozhilov), Иван (Ivan); Ваклинов (Vaklinov), Станчо (Stancho); Гюзелев (Gyuzelev), Васил (Vasil); Куев (Kuev), Кую (kuyu); Петров (Petrov), Петър (Petar); Примов (Primov), Борислав (Borislav); Тъпкова (Tapkova), Василка (Vasilka); Цанокова (Tsankova), Геновева (Genoveva) (1982). История на България. Том II. Първа българска държава [History of Bulgaria. Volume II. First Bulgarian State] (in Bulgarian). и колектив. София (Sofia): Издателство на БАН (Bulgarian Academy of Sciences Press).
- Ангелов (Angelov), Димитър (Dimitar) (1950). По въпроса за стопанския облик на българските земи през XI–XII век (On the Issue about the Economic Outlook of the Bulgarian Lands during the XI–XII centuries) (in Bulgarian). ИП (IP).
- Бакалов (Bakalov), Георги (Georgi); Ангелов (Angelov), Петър (Petar); Павлов (Pavlov), Пламен (Plamen); Коев (Koev), Тотю (Totyu); Александров (Aleksandrov), Емил (Emil) (2003). История на българите от древността до края на XVI век (History of the Bulgarians from Antiquity to the end of the XVI century) (in Bulgarian). и колектив. София (Sofia): Знание (Znanie). ISBN 954-621-186-9.
- Божилов (Bozhilov), Иван (Ivan) (1994). Фамилията на Асеневци (1186–1460). Генеалогия и просопография (The Family of the Asens (1186–1460). Genealogy and Prosopography) (in Bulgarian). София (Sofia): Издателство на БАН (Bulgarian Academy of Sciences Press). ISBN 954-430-264-6.
- Божилов (Bozhilov), Иван (Ivan); Гюзелев (Gyuzelev), Васил (Vasil) (1999). История на средновековна България VII–XIV век (History of Medieval Bulgaria VII–XIV centuries) (in Bulgarian). София (Sofia): Анубис (Anubis). ISBN 954-426-204-0.
- Делев, Петър; Валери Кацунов; Пламен Митев; Евгения Калинова; Искра Баева; Боян Добрев (2006). "19. България при цар Иван Александър". История и цивилизация за 11-ти клас (in Bulgarian). Труд, Сирма.
- Дочев (Dochev), Константин (Konstantin) (1992). Монети и парично обръщение в Търново (XII–XIV век) (Coins and Monetary Circulation in Tarnovo (XII–XIV centuries)) (in Bulgarian). Велико Търново (Veliko Tarnovo).
- Дуйчев (Duychev), Иван (Ivan) (1972). Българско средновековие (Bulgarian Middle Ages) (in Bulgarian). София (Sofia): Наука и Изкуство (Nauka i Izkustvo).
- Златарски (Zlatarski), Васил (Vasil) (1972) [1940]. История на българската държава през Средните векове. Том III. Второ българско царство. България при Асеневци (1185–1280). (History of the Bulgarian state in the Middle Ages. Volume III. Second Bulgarian Empire. Bulgaria under the Asen Dynasty (1185–1280)) (in Bulgarian) (2 ed.). София (Sofia): Наука и изкуство (Nauka i izkustvo). Archived from the original on 7 April 2023.
- Георгиева (Georgieva), Цветана (Tsvetana); Генчев (Genchev), Николай (Nikolay) (1999). История на България XV–XIX век (History of Bulgaria XV–XIX centuries) (in Bulgarian). София (Sofia): Анубис (Anubis). ISBN 954-426-205-9.
- Коледаров (Koledarov), Петър (Petar) (1989). Политическа география на средновековната Българска държава, част 2 (1185–1396) (Political Geography of the Medieval Bulgarian State, Part II. From 1185 to 1396) (in Bulgarian). София (Sofia): Издателство на БАН (Bulgarian Academy of Sciences Press).
- Колектив (Collective) (1965). Латински извори за българската история (ГИБИ), том III (Latin Sources for Bulgarian History (LIBI), volume III) (in Bulgarian and Latin). София (Sofia): Издателство на БАН (Bulgarian Academy of Sciences Press). Archived from the original on 4 June 2023.
- Колектив (Collective) (1981). Латински извори за българската история (ГИБИ), том IV (Latin Sources for Bulgarian History (LIBI), volume IV) (in Bulgarian and Latin). София (Sofia): Издателство на БАН (Bulgarian Academy of Sciences Press). Archived from the original on 4 June 2023.
- Лишев (Lishev), Страшимир (Strashimir) (1970). Българският средновековен град (The Medieval Bulgarian City) (in Bulgarian). София (Sofia): Издателство на БАН (Bulgarian Academy of Sciences Press).
- Иречек (Jireček), Константин (Konstantin) (1978). "XXIII Завладяване на България от турците (Conquest of Bulgaria by the Turks)". In Петър Петров (Petar Petrov) (ed.). История на българите с поправки и добавки от самия автор (History of the Bulgarians with corrections and additions by the author) (in Bulgarian). София (Sofia): Издателство Наука и изкуство. Archived from the original on 26 November 2022.
- Николова (Nikolova), Бистра (Bistra) (2002). Православните църкви през Българското средновековие IX–XIV в. (The Orthodox churches during the Bulgarian Middle Ages 9th–14th century) (in Bulgarian). София (Sofia): Академично издателство "Марин Дринов" (Academic press "Marin Drinov"). ISBN 954-430-762-1.
- Павлов (Pavlov), Пламен (Plamen) (2008). Българското средновековие. Познато и непознато (The Bulgarian Middle Ages. Known and Unknown) (in Bulgarian). Велико Търново (Veliko Tarnovo): Абагар (Abagar). ISBN 978-954-427-796-3.
- Петров (Petrov), П. (P.); Гюзелев (Gyuzelev), Васил (Vasil) (1978). Христоматия по история на България. Том 2. Същинско средновековие XII–XIV век (Reader on the History of Bulgaria. Volume 2. High Middle Ages XII–XIV centuries) (in Bulgarian). София (Sofia): Издателство Наука и изкуство.
- Радушев (Radushev), Ангел (Angel); Жеков (Zhekov), Господин (Gospodin) (1999). Каталог на българските средновековни монети IX–XV век (Catalogue of the Medieval Bulgarian coins IX–XV centuries) (in Bulgarian). Агато (Anubis). ISBN 954-8761-45-9.
- Фоменко (Fomenko), Игорь Константинович (Igor K.) (2011). "Карты-реконструкции = Reconstruction maps". Образ мира на старинных портоланах. Причерноморье. Конец XIII – XVII [The Image of the World on Old Portolans. The Black Sea Littoral from the End of the 13th – the 17th Centuries] (in Russian). Moscow: "Индрик" (Indrik). ISBN 978-5-91674-145-2.
- Цончева (Tsoncheva), М. (M.) (1974). Търновска книжовна школа. 1371–1971 (Tarnovo Literary School. 1371–1971) (in Bulgarian). София (Sofia).
