= List of people of Cuman descent =

The Cumans, also known as "Polovtsians", were a Turkic nomadic people comprising the western branch of the Cuman–Kipchak confederation. Their homeland covered parts of present-day southern Russia and neighbouring countries, in the 10th to 13th century.

== People of Cuman descent ==
- Qutb-ud-din Aibak - founder of the Delhi sultanate.
- Khan Boniak/Bonyak/Boniek/Bongek/Maniak. Boniak was a khan during the time of Sharukan. He was called "the Mangy" by Russians. He led invasions, together with Togortac, on Kievan Rus’ in 1096, 1097, 1105, and 1107. In 1096 Boniak attacked Kiev, burned down the princely palace in Berestove, and plundered the Kiev Monastery of the Caves. In 1107 he was defeated by the Kievan Rus’ princes' forces near Lubny. He led the invasions, together with Togortac, on Kievan Rus. He is mentioned for the last time in the Primary Chronicle in 1167, when he was defeated by Prince Oleg I of Chernigov. Boniak is often represented as a sorcerer in Rus' folklore.
- Taz (meaning 'bald'), brother of Boniak. He perished at the battle on the Sula River, along with Sugr.
- Khan Köten Sutoiovych (Kuthen/Kotian/Kotony/Zayhan or Jonas), son of Khan Konchek. He is Mstislav Mstislavich's father-in-law. Köten was of the Terteroba clan. He participated in the power struggles between the princes of Kievan Rus' in 1202, 1225 and 1228. After the defeat by the Mongols in 1222, he convinced the princes of Kievan Rus' to forge an alliance against the Mongols. He fought in the war against the Mongols (allied with the Russians) in the Battle of Kalka River, where the Rus'-Cuman alliance was defeated. In 1238 he was again defeated by Batu Khan on the Astrakhan steppes. Afterwards, Köten led 40,000 "huts" (families) (around 70 - 80,000 people) to Hungary (to escape from the Mongols), where he was later assassinated. The Cumans then left Hungary, pillaging along the way and migrated to the Second Bulgarian Empire. Some of the Cumans were later asked to come back to Hungary and help rebuild it after Mongol devastation. He was possibly the most notable of Cumans (together with Baibars). Köten was from the Terteroba clan that ruled Cumania in the late 11th century, as well as in the mid-13th century.
- Khan Köten's daughter, married Mstislav Mstislavich, Prince of Halych (r. 1219–1228).
- Khan Köten's second daughter, married Narjot de Toucy. After her husband died, she became a nun.
- Khan Konchak (Konchek, Kumcheg - meaning 'trousers') Otrakovich, his daughter married Igor's son, prince Vladimir III Igorevich of Putivl. He was involved in wars and raids with the Russians (Prince Igor), along the Ros River, where the Cumans attacked towns belonging to the Olgovichi (the ruling dynasty of Chernigov). He defeated Igor Svyatoslavich, prince of the Principality of Novgorod-Seversk, the tale of which is immortalized in the Rus' epic The Tale of Igor's Campaign. He united the western and eastern Cuman-Kipchak tribes.
- Konchakovna (also known as Svoboda), daughter of Khan Konchek, married prince Vladimir III Igorevich of Putivl (son of Igor Svyatoslavich) in 1188.
- Yuri, son of Khan Konchek. His name may indicate his conversion to Christianity.
- Khan Kobyak/Kobiak/Kopyak/Köpek ("dog" in Turkish), one of the leaders of Crimea. He was involved in wars and raids against Prince Igor, along the Ros River, where the Cumans attacked towns belonging to the Olgovichi (the ruling dynasty of Chernigov). He also participated with Khan Konchak in an assault on Kievan Rus’. Kobiak, Khan Konchak and other notable were routed and captured on the Khorol River in 1183/1184. He had an alliance with Igor in his feud with the son of Rostislav I.
- IIziaslav Vladimirovich, son of prince Vladimir III Igorevich and Konchakovna (Svoboda). He was prince of Terebovl in 1210.
- Isac and Daniel, sons of Kobiak.
- Chilbuk: chieftain, captured Igor of Novgorod-Seversk
- Roman, son of Kza, chieftain, captured Vsevolod of Kursk.
- Khan Gzak/Gza/Kza/Koza, chieftain, father of Roman. Khan Gzak was a rival of Khan Konchek.He attacked Putyvl where Prince Igor Svyatoslavich's army is destroyed; the prince gets wounded and captured with his son and brother. This tale is immortalized in the Rus' epic The Tale of Igor's Campaign and in Alexander Borodin's opera Prince Igor.
- Kopti, chieftain, captured Vladimir.
- Eldechyuk: chieftain, captured Svyatoslav of Rilsk.
- Toksobich, Kolobich, Etebich, Tetrobich - Russian versions of Cuman-Kipchak chieftains captured in battle, may be any of the above forementioned or other individuals entirely. The Cuman-Kipchak base name would most likely be the equivalent of - Toks(o), Kolo, Ete, Tetr(o).
- Lavor/Ovlur/Vlur, possibly a kinsman, aided Igor in his escape.
- Sharokan/Sharohan/Sharukan, (Cuman-Kipchak base name Sharu/Sharo), chieftain, Konchak's grandfather, who had been defeated by the Russians in a great battle on the Sula River in 1107. Called "the Old" by Russians.
- Khan Ayepa, son of Osen, father in law of Yuri Dolgorukiy (a Russian Rurikid prince and founder of Moscow). His daughter married Yuri Dolgorukiy. Khan Ayepa attacked Volga Bulgaria, perhaps due to an instigation of his son in law. The Bulgars in turn poisoned Ayepa and the other princes, all of which died.
- Prince Andrei I of Vladimir (Andrey Bogolyubsky). He was the son of Yuri Dolgoruki, who proclaimed Andrei a prince in Vyshhorod (near Kiev). His mother was a Polovtsian/Cuman princess, khan Aepa's/Ayepa's daughter. Andrey is beatified as a saint in Russian Orthodox Church. He was known in the West as Scythian Caesar.
- Toglyy: Cuman chieftain during time of Igor's imprisonment.
- Sokal, Cuman chieftain who obtained a major victory against Rus' in 1061.
- Kutesk, headed the Cuman (Or rather Pecheneg) attack on Hungary in 1085-1086, coming into Hungary by a north-east route, possibly via Verecke pass. He may be synonymous with the Hungarian version of Cselgü.
- Boricius, Cuman chieftain in Hungary, of the 4th rank of Cuman political hierarchy.
- Jiajak Jaqeli, empress consort of Alexios II of Trebizond. Jiajak (meaning 'flower') was daughter of Beka I, the Cuman atabeg of Samtskhe. The Jaqelis held the Georgian feudal office of Eristavi, which could be "governor of a region" or an "army-commander".
- Etrek/Otrok/Atraka, son of Sharokan/Sharohan/Sharukan. Otrok withdrew to the north Caucasian steppes due to the aggressive policies of Vladimir II Monomakh, grand prince of Kievan Rus'. Thereafter, in 1118, 40,000 Cuman troops under Otrok entered the service of the Georgian king David IV of Georgia, where they helped to make Georgia the most powerful kingdom in the region.
- Princess Gurandukht, daughter of Khan Otrok of the Cumans. She married king David IV of Georgia in 1107. The marriage occurred years before the recruitment of around 40,000 Cuman-Kipchaks in the Georgian service. Gurandukht is a Persian name; her original Turkic name is unknown as are the details of her life. The chronicler of king David IV praises Gurandukht's virtues and points out that the marriage helped David to secure the transfer of the Cuman-Kipchak families as allies of the Georgian crown, which in turn helped to make Georgia the most powerful kingdom in the region.
- Vakhtang, born in 1118, son of King David IV of Georgia and the Cuman princess Gurandukht, daughter of Khan Otrok. He was involved in an attempted coup against Demetrius I of Georgia, his brother and heir apparent. Vakhtang was captured, blinded and cast in prison where he apparently died shortly afterwards.
- Sirchan, son of Sharokan/Sharohan/Sharukan.
- Eltut, brother to Konchak/Konchek, died when the Chernigovian-Cuman army was defeated in 1180.
- Sevinch, son of Khan Boniak/Maniak. Sevinch helped Yuri Dolgorukiy, grand prince of Kiev, in 1151, in his struggles against other princes in the south. According to the Rus sources, Sevinch expressed his desire to "plant his sword in the golden gate of Kiev as his illustrious father had done."
- Yurgi/Yuri, occidental name of Konchak/Konchek's son, died against the Mongols at the Battle of Kalka River. He and his father Khan Konchek tried to create a more cohesive force out of the many Cuman tribes. His Russian name may indicate his conversion to Christianity.
- Asalup, his daughter married Igor's grandfather, Oleg.
- Girgen, his granddaughter was Igor's stepmother.
- Zeyhan/Zehanus, possible murderer of Ladislas IV.
- Turtel/Tort-oyul, meaning "five sons" possible murderer of Ladislas IV.
- Menk/Manj/Mäŋ, meaning "birthmark", led Béla IV's troops in 1264 against Béla's own son, Duke Stephen.
- Begovars (r.: Bey-bars), Cuman chieftain who led the Cumans that helped King Béla IV of Hungary with his attack on the Kingdom of Galicia–Volhynia in 1229. It is plausible that he is identical with Bortz (also Boricius).
- Tortel/Tortul, one of the murderers of King Ladislaus IV in 1290. "Five" according to András Pálóczi-Horváth, "four" according to "Kinship in the Altaic word".
- Uzur: a member of the Great Council at Teteny which settled the provisions of the law of 1279 regarding Cuman settlement. In preparatory discussion for this, Cuman interests were represented by Uzur and Tolon.
- Tolon, meaning "full moon", participated with Uzur in the preparatory discussion for the Great Council at Teteny which settled the provisions of the law of 1279 regarding Cuman settlement.
- Alpra/Al-bura (meaning "tawny colored camel", supreme Cuman commander of the 1260s and 70s, who in 1273 King Charles of Sicily admonishes to stay loyal to the Hungarian crown after the death of King Stephen.
- Arbuz [meaning "watermelon" according to Palóczi and Rásonyi, a less accepted theory connects it to Turkic "arva-" (to cast a spell, to do magic); Kipchak "arba-" + deverbal (noun or adjective forming) suffix "-ış" or "-uş"], possible murderer of Ladislaus IV.
- Kemenche, meaning "little bow", possible murderer of Ladislas IV - assassination attempt on the king of Hungary; he was caught and executed.
- Kutlu Aslan (happy lion in Turkish) - involved in Kubasar's coup.
- Kitzes, chief of the Cumans that were in a war against the Byzantine Empire. He fought a battle against emperor Alexios I Komnenos with a body of 12,000 Cumans. The Cumans lost the battle; Alexios had the mountain passes sealed and either massacred or captured the Cuman forces who had refused to submit.
- Sytzigan (from Cuman-Turkic Sïčğan, "mouse"), Syrgiannes after baptism, son of a Cuman leader and member of an influential Cuman group that was present in the Byzantine court. Later he marries a member of the ruling Palaiologos family and before 1290 became Megas Domestikos (Commander-in-Chief of the Army), a title granted by Byzantine Emperor Andronikos II. Sytzigan's son, Syrgiannes Palaiologos was a Pinkernes and a friend of Andronikos III Palaiologos and John Kantakouzenos.
- Bortz (Burchi, Boricius), Hungary, prince of the Cumans that settled in Hungary. Under his leadership, he and 15,000 Cumans got baptized in 1227.
- Bachman Khan, he rallied the Cuman-Kipchak clans after a Mongol surprise attack in 1237 – they hid in the forests along the Dnieper River. Khan Bachman and his ally, the Alan leader Catchar and were eventually surrounded and captured by Budjek and Mangku/Möngke/Mangku Khan. Möngke Khan demanded he kneel before him. Khan Bachman refused and said “Do you think I am a camel?” Instead of asking for mercy, Bachman asked to die by Möngke’s own hand. Instead, Möngke had Budjek kill him - by cutting him in two, possibly as insult to injury. Khan Bachman’s death was a major blow to the Cuman-Kipchaks’ fate
- Sultan Baibars ("white bigcat-Siberian Tiger"/"leopard" in Turkic), fourth Sultan of Egypt from the Mamluk Bahri dynasty. He was one of the commanders of the Egyptian forces that inflicted a devastating defeat on the Seventh Crusade of King Louis IX of France. He also led the vanguard of the Egyptian army at the Battle of Ain Jalut in 1260,[2] which marked the second substantial defeat of the Mongol army, and is considered a turning point in history.
- Qalawun, Sultan of Egypt (Mamluk Sultanate).
- Quman, a noble Bulgar.
- Quman, a governor of Haleb (Aleppo), Syria.
- Seyhan, a Cuman chieftain and father of Queen Elizabeth the Cuman. Historians point out that a charter of her father-in-law, Béla IV refers to a Cuman chieftain Seyhan as his kinsman, implying that Seyhan was Elizabeth's father. His domains lay near the Tisza.
- Elizabeth the Cuman, queen of Hungary in 1272-1277, during the minority of her son, King Ladislaus IV of Hungary. She was queen consort and wife of King Stephen V of Hungary. A struggle took place between her and the noble opposition, which led to her imprisonment; but supporters freed her in 1274. Elizabeth was the daughter of Seyhan, a Cuman chieftain.
- Ladislaus IV of Hungary, "The Cuman", son of Elizabeth the Cuman and King Stephen V of Hungary. He was the King of Hungary.
- Anna of Hungary (1260–1281), daughter of Elizabeth the Cuman and King Stephen V of Hungary.
- Elizabeth of Hungary, Queen of Serbia was one of the older children of King Stephen V of Hungary and his wife Queen Elizabeth the Cuman. She first married Zavis Vítkovci, Lord of Rosenberg, Skalitz and Falkenstein and secondly Stefan Uroš II Milutin of Serbia.
- Andrew of Hungary (1268 – 1278), son of Elizabeth the Cuman and King Stephen V of Hungary. He was the Duke of Slavonia.
- Elizabeth of Sicily, Queen of Hungary (Trouble with Cumans).
- Catherine of Hungary, Queen of Serbia, second daughter of Elizabeth the Cuman and King Stephen V of Hungary. She became Queen of Serbia.
- Michael IX Palaiologos (17 April 1277 – 12 October 1320), son of Anna of Hungary.
- Tsar Ivan Asen I of the Second Bulgarian Empire, established the Second Bulgarian Empire, with the help of his Cuman allies. First emperor of the new empire. The Asen dynasty is of Cuman origin, as well as the Terter dynasty (which Köten was part of) and the Shishman dynasty.
- Boril of Bulgaria (Boril Kaliman), 1207–1218, Second Bulgarian Empire, descended from Cumans through the Asen dynasty of Bulgaria - of Cuman origin.
- Everyone from the Sratsimir dynasty, a medieval Bulgarian dynasty that ruled the Tsardom of Tarnovo, the Tsardom of Vidin, the Principality of Valona and Kanina, and the Despotate of Lovech. Paternally, they descended from the Asen dynasty (of Cuman origin), and maternally, they descended from the Shishman dynasty (of Cuman origin).
- Sratsimir, of the Sratsimir dynasty.
- Patriarch Joseph II of Constantinople, Patriarch of Constantinople 1416-1439, Sratsimir dynasty.
- Fruzhin, a 15th-century Bulgarian noble who fought actively against the Ottoman conquest of the Second Bulgarian Empire. He was a son of one of Tsar Ivan Shishman.
- John Komnenos Asen (1332 – 1363), of the Sratsimir dynasty.
- Alexander Komnenos Asen (1363 – 1372), of the Sratsimir dynasty.
- Komnena (1372 – 1395), of the Sratsimir dynasty.
- Helena of Bulgaria (1332 – 1356), of the Sratsimir dynasty.
- Tsar Peter IV of Bulgaria, 1186–1197, Second Bulgarian Empire.
- Tsar Ivan Asen II of the Second Bulgarian Empire, 1218–1241.
- Tsar Ivan Stephen Shishman, of the Second Bulgarian Empire, son of Michael III Shishman.
- Tsar Kaloyan, Second Bulgarian Empire, defeated the crusaders with the help of his Cumans, captured Baldwin.
- Tsar Kaliman I of Bulgaria (Kaliman Asen) of the Second Bulgarian Empire.
- Tsar Constantine Tikh of Bulgaria, 1257–1277.
- Tsar Michael Asen I of Bulgaria, Second Bulgarian Empire.
- Tsar Michael Asen II of Bulgaria, Second Bulgarian Empire.
- Tsar Michael Asen III of Bulgaria, Second Bulgarian Empire.
- Tsar Michael Asen IV of Bulgaria, Second Bulgarian Empire.
- Tsar Kaliman Asen II of Bulgaria, Second Bulgarian Empire.
- Tsar Mitso Asen of the Second Bulgarian Empire.
- Tsar Ivan Asen III of the Second Bulgarian Empire
- Tsar George Terter I of the Second Bulgarian Empire, descended from the Cuman Terteroba clan. Khan Köten was probably his relative or even direct ancestor.
- Tsar George Terter II of the Second Bulgarian Empire, descended from the Cuman Terteroba clan.
- Aldimir (Bulgarian: Алдимир) or Eltimir. A member of the Terter dynasty and a younger brother of Tsar George I Terter, Aldimir was an influential local ruler as the despot of Kran. Khan Köten was probably his relative or even direct ancestor. His name means "heated iron".
- Dobrotitsa, a Bulgarian noble, ruler of the de facto independent Principality of Karvuna and the Kaliakra fortress from 1354 to 1379–1386. He is considered a Bulgarian noble kindred of the Terter dynasty (from the Cuman Terteroba clan).
- Balik, Dobrotitsa's brother and a noble of the Second Bulgarian Empire. He increased the autonomy of his province and became despot of the Principality of Karvuna. During the Byzantine civil war of 1341–1347 he supported the regent Anna of Savoy against pretender John VI Kantakouzenos. Balik's death was in 1347, either due to an outbreak of the Black Death or being killed during a retaliation campaign led by Umur Beg, on behalf of John V Palaiologos, that destroyed Dobruja's seaports. He was succeeded by his brother, Dobrotitsa.
- Tsar Michael III Shishman of the Second Bulgarian Empire.
- Tsar Theodore Svetoslav of the Second Bulgarian Empire, son of George Terter I.
- Tsar Ivan Alexander of the Second Bulgarian Empire, descended of the Asen, Terter and Shishman dynasties. Was Tsar during the second golden age of Bulgaria (naphew of Michael Shishman).
- Ivan Shishman of Bulgaria (b. 1350/1351, ruled 1371–1395 in Tarnovo).
- Constantine II, 1396–1422, spent most of his life in exile. Most historians do not include him in the list of the Bulgarian monarchs.
- Ivan Sratsimir of Bulgaria (b. 1324/1325, ruled 1356–1397 in Vidin).
- Belaur of Vidin, 1336 (Shishman dynasty).
- Constantine II of Bulgaria (b. early 1370s, ruled 1397–1422 in Vidin and in exile).
- Darman and Kudelin - Bulgarians of Cuman origin.
- Queen Dorothea of Bosnia.
- The Cuman Tsaritsa of Bulgaria, Cuman noblewoman who subsequently married two Tsars Emperors of Bulgaria, Kaloyan of Bulgaria and Boril of Bulgaria.
- Shishman of Vidin.
- Thocomerius of Wallachia, father of Basarab I of Wallachia who founded the House of Basarab. László Rásonyi derives the name from a well-known Cuman and Tatar name, Toq-tämir (‘hardened steel’). His Cuman origins are not confirmed and remain a theory.
- Every ruler from the Wallachian House of Dănești, which was one of the two main lineages of the Wallachian noble family House of Basarab. They were descended from Dan I of Wallachia. The other lineage of the Basarabs is the House of Drăculești. Their Cuman lineage is not confirmed.
- The House of Drăculești were one of two major rival lines of Wallachian voivodes of the House of Basarab, the other being the Dănești. Their Cuman lineage is not confirmed.
- Syrgiannés/Sıçğan It is seen that some of the Cumans, who were on the way to prevent the Seljuk Turks expansion and were taken into Byzantine service after a Mongolian invasion, also served in the imperial palace and rose to high positions in time. As a matter of fact, Syrgiannés (Sytzigan: Sıçğan: Rat), who was the son of one of the Cuman begs, was baptized and married a woman from the Palaiologos family, and later received the title of Megas Domestic. The presence of his descendants in the Byzantine Empire continued for nearly 100 years. The last representative of this The Cuman Family, which was later assimilated into Byzantine Culture was also named Syrgiannés, just like the first member of the family. Syrgiannés, who was the governor of Macedonia and Thrace, was the elder emperor II. After participating in the struggles between Andronikos and his grandson that started in 1320, he fell out of favor and led a dull life until he was killed by the emperor's men in 1334.
- Anna Polovetskaya cuman father

== See also ==
- Cumans
