= Nogai Khan =

Mongol general and kingmaker (died 1299/1300)

Nogai
- Prince of Borjigin
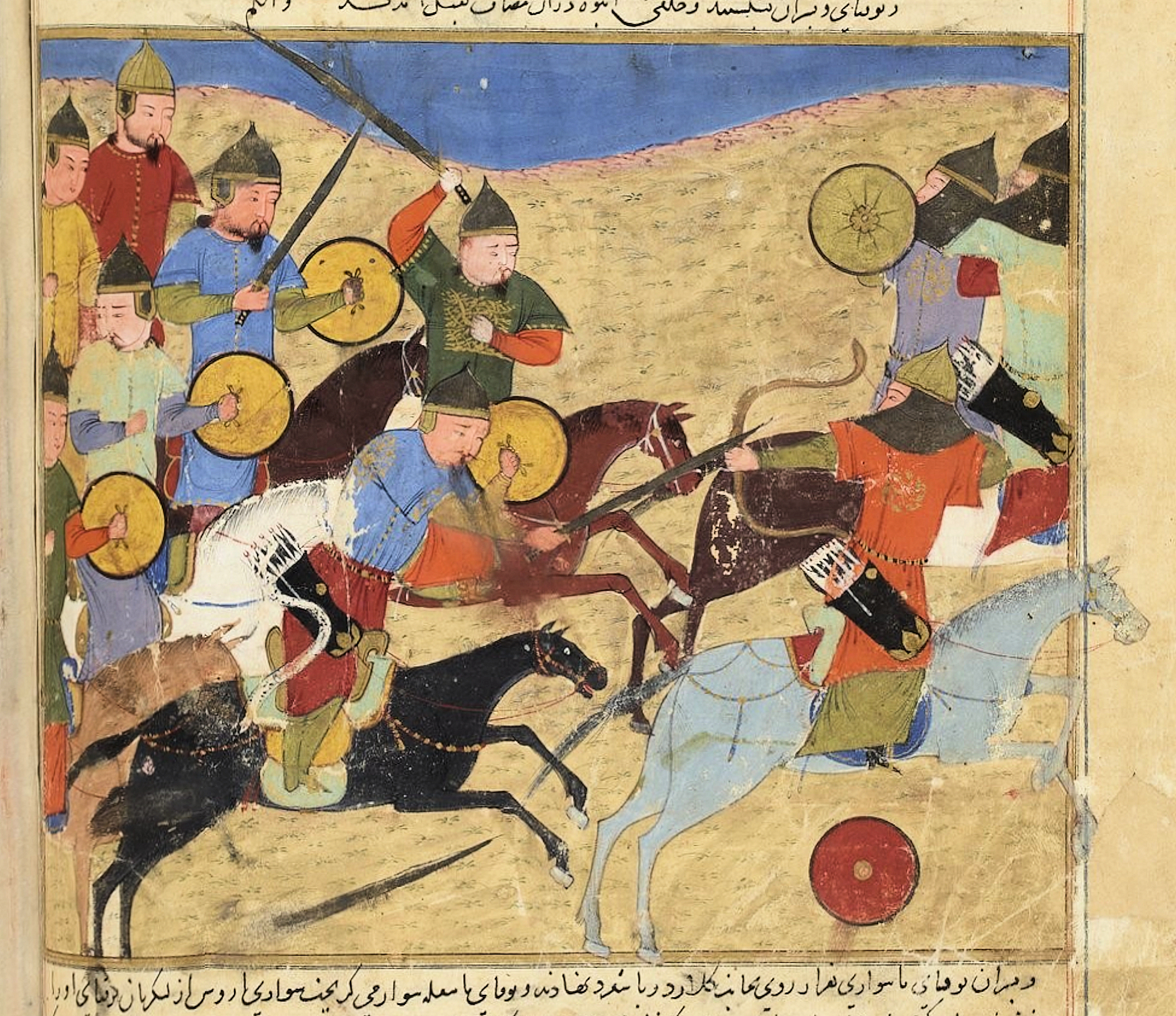
- Troops of Nogai Khan on the offensive, at the Battle between Toqta Khan and Nogai. Circa 1430 miniature
- Died: c. 1300
- Spouse: Euphrosyne Palaiologina; Alagh (Алаг)
- Issue: Chaka, Tsar of Bulgaria
- House: Borjigin
- Father: Tatar
- Religion: Tengrism, later Sunni Islam (in 1262/1263)
- Military career
- Allegiance: Golden Horde
- Branch: Golden Horde army
- Service years: 1250s – 1290s
- Rank: Army General
- Conflicts: Berke–Hulegu war; Mongol invasion of Europe; Second Mongol invasion of Hungary; Second Mongol invasion of Poland; Third Mongol invasion of Poland

Nogai, or Noğay (Kypchak and Turki: نوغای; also spelled Nogay, Nogaj, Nohai, Nokhai, Noqai, Ngoche, Noche, Kara Nokhai, and Isa Nogai; died 1299/1300) was a general and kingmaker of the Golden Horde. His great-grandfather was Jochi, son of Genghis Khan.

Though he never formally ruled the Golden Horde himself, he was effectively the co-ruler of the state alongside whatever khan was in power at the time and had unrestricted control over the portions west of the Dnieper. At his height, Nogai was one of the most powerful men in Europe and widely thought of as the Horde's true head. The Russian chroniclers gave him the title of tsar, while the Franciscan missionaries in the Crimea spoke of him as a co-emperor. Nogai was also a notable convert to Islam.

== Name ==
French historian Paul Pelliot wrote that Nokhai meant "dog". Although in the Mongolian language, "nokhoi" (in Mongolian script: ᠨᠣᠬᠠᠢ, nokhai) literally means a "dog", it does not necessarily mean a particularly negative and insulting name in its context, since people were called "dogs" among the Mongols at the time and sometimes presently as "nokhduud" as in "you dogs (guys/men/people)". Genghis Khan also called his capable generals "dogs of war" or "men of war". This probably came about because Mongols had a lot of dogs, which were very useful for people's lives in hunting and alerting them to danger. Thus dogs became a big part of nomadic life and also played a big part in their religion. According to British historian J. J. Saunders, the name "Dog" was used to distract the attention of evil spirits (presumably, they would not be interested in a canine). The Mongols sometimes referred to the wolf as a "steppe dog".

== Early life ==
Nogai was born to Tatar (or Tutar), a son of Terval, who was a son of Jochi. He would rule his grandfather's appanage after his father died. After the Mongol invasion of Europe, Batu Khan left Nogai with a tumen (10,000 warriors) in modern-day Moldavia and Romania as a frontier guard. He was a nephew of Berke Khan as well as Batu Khan and Orda Khan, and under his uncle, he became a powerful and ambitious warlord. In his later years, Berke began to delegate more and more responsibility to his promising nephew Nogai, and Nogai's first command appears, along with Talabuga, under famous Mongol general Burundai, as a young sub-commander during the second major Mongol raid against Poland, undertaken to pay for Berke's war against Hulegu. Here Nogai distinguished himself and plundered Sandomierz, Kraków and other cities.

Nogai's father Tatar died when he was serving under Hulegu (r. 1256–1265).

== Rise to power ==
=== Berke–Hulegu War ===
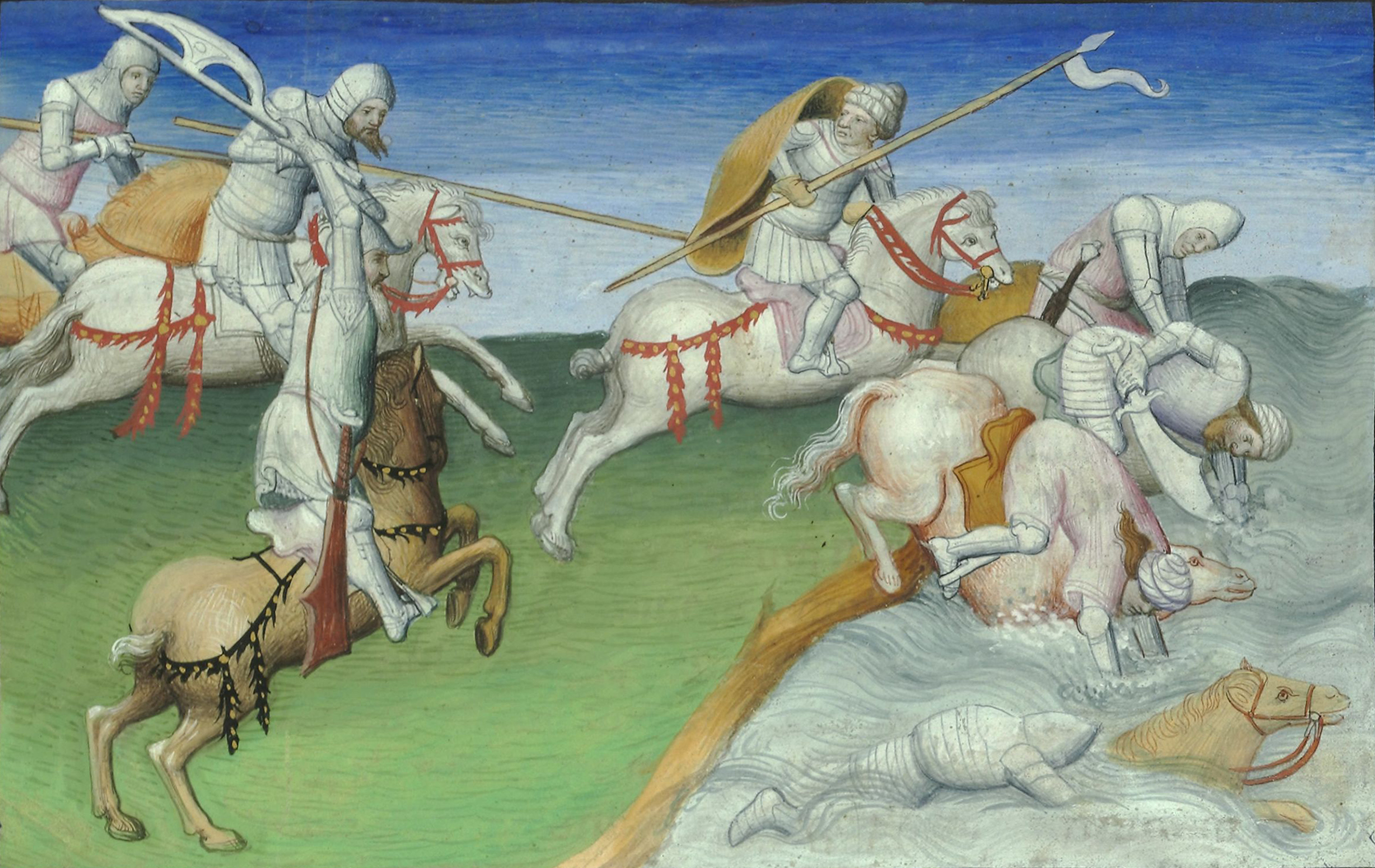
Nogai defeats Hulegu at the Battle of Terek in 1263.

In 1262, a civil war broke out between the Golden Horde and the Ilkhanate, with Berke and Hulegu supporting separate claimants for the title of khagan. Nogai Khan was given a high role in the army of the Golden Horde; Rashid Al-Din describes him as Berke's "commander-in-chief". He had a command of 30,000 men. He was first charged with raiding along the frontier into the territory of the Ilkhanate; Nogai made multiple reconnaissances in force into the Caucasus region, drawing Hulegu north with the bulk of his forces. He annihilated an advance guard under Shiramun, and raided as far as the Kur, but was himself repulsed near Shabran in December 1262, and forced to retreat. Nogai then took on the task of repelling Hulegu's attempted invasion, as the latter was emboldened; Hulegu marched north with his army to invade Berke's territory, attempting to envelope Nogai's army at the Terek, but found only an abandoned camp. While Hulegu's men were looting the camp, Nogai's troops surprised Hulegu's at the Terek River, cutting down a great many of them in an ambush. Hulegu rallied his men and a day-long battle ensued; the fighting was fierce, but the Golden Horde's initial advantage was too great. The Ilkhanate army was routed and many thousands of them were drowned while trying to flee, and the survivors fled back into Azerbaijan. This victory greatly enhanced Nogai's reputation in the Horde, and he was already a trusted lieutenant of Berke.

In August 1264, the war effectively ended when Kublai Khan was crowned khagan with the acknowledgement of Berke, Hulegu, and Chagatai. However the war was renewed between the Golden Horde and Ilkhanate in 1265. Nogai was given the task of leading an invasion of the Ilkhanate, now ruled by Hulegu's successor Abaqa Khan. He invaded Persia and plundered some areas before being met in battle by Abaqa on the Aksu. A fierce and severe battle ensued in which Nogai was personally injured (losing an eye) and his army was forced to retreat. Abaqa pursued Nogai's army across the Kur, hoping to wipe it out, but Abaqa was forced to withdraw when Berke arrived with reinforcements.

=== Invasion of Byzantine Thrace ===
According to J. J. Saunders, Nogai led 20,000 men across the Danube in 1265, where he routed the Byzantine forces before him and ravaged the cities of Thrace. However, Nicephorus Gregoras attributed the earlier raid to Mongol forces enlisted by the Bulgarian tsar, Konstantin Tikh, while Pachymeres described them as an autonomous Tatar band operating independently of the Golden Horde, suggesting the invasion was likely carried out by Bulgarian-allied mercenaries rather than by Nogai himself.

In 1266, Emperor Michael VIII Palaeologus, anxious to make an alliance, gave his illegitimate daughter, Euphrosyne Palaiologina, to Nogai as a wife. He gave much valuable fabric to the Golden Horde as tribute, and became an ally of the Horde, principally dealing with it through Nogai instead of the official khan. He also gifted Nogai pearls, jewels, and valuable garments, temporarily causing Nogai to abandon the animal skins he usually wore outside of battle. Nogai did however slyly ask if the jewels and clothes could ward off lightning bolts, prevent headache, or promote good health, before praising the practicality of the dog skins his people wore.

== De facto rule: 1266–1294 ==
Berke died sometime in 1266. Despite his influence, Nogai did not try to seize rule of the Golden Horde, settling for serving under Mengu-Timur Khan. However, he managed to exercise de facto control, with near-total control over the lands west of the Dnieper. In addition to his Turkic subjects, he ruled the Ruthenians of Galicia–Volhynia, the Ossetians, and part of the Vlachs, directly. He also undertook his own foreign policy, sending envoys to the Mamluk Sultanate, forming marriage alliances with Byzantium and the Il-Khanate, and raiding various European kingdoms.

=== Invasions of Bulgaria and Byzantium ===
In 1271 and 1274, Nogai led raids against Bulgaria and Byzantium. In the first raid, the Byzantine emperor Michael VIII avoided battle and offered his daughter as wife for Nogai. In Bulgaria in 1277, an anti-Mongol uprising led by Ivaylo of Bulgaria gained the support of many soldiers and nobles and defeated a column of raiding Mongols. In response, in 1278–79 Nogai personally led a force that defeated Bulgarian rebel forces, raided the country, and besieged Ivaylo in Silistra, however he withdrew after three months. Ivaylo subsequently escaped the Mongol blockade and led a Bulgarian force to victory over Nogai's Byzantine allies at Devina. In 1280 Ivaylo began to lose support among his followers who wanted to stop wars with Byzantium, sections of the Bulgarian nobility, and Mongol raiding parties. The Bulgarian nobility subsequently elected George Terter I as emperor, which prompted Ivaylo to appeal to Nogai make him emperor again. Nogai at first received Ivaylo warmly, but at the following feast, in which Ivaylo and Ivan Asen III were seated to Nogai's sides, Nogai pointed at Ivaylo and said "He is an enemy of my father, the Emperor Michael VIII, and does not deserve to live." Ivaylo was executed on the spot by Nogai's guards. Nogai considered executing Ivan as well, the second pretender to the Bulgarian throne, but his wife Euphrosyne requested he spare Ivan, and Nogai relented. Ivan was allowed to flee to Anatolia. Nogai made the new Bulgarian emperor George Terter his vassal. After George's flight to Constantinople, Nogai set his close associate Smilets on the Bulgarian throne, keeping Bulgaria a vassal of the Golden Horde.

In 1282, Nogai sent 4,000 Mongol soldiers to Constantinople, to help his father-in-law Emperor Michael suppress the rebels headed by John I Doukas of Thessaly. But Michael died and Andronikos II used the allied troops to fight against Serbia.

=== Invasion of Hungary ===
In the winter of 1285, Nogai and Talabuga invaded Hungary with Mongol and Cuman troops on two fronts with a considerable army. Nogai had been told of the perilous political situation in Hungary by fleeing Cuman warriors (King Ladislaus IV's nobles were practically rebelling against him, and Hungary had just been weakened by a Cuman rebellion they had recently defeated), and planned to capitalize on it by launching a vast campaign against the apparently weakened kingdom. The invasion plan was devised by Nogai, with two columns led by him and Talabuga. Talabuga's troops devastated Transylvania and raided as far as Pest, but the Hungarians' newly constructed fortification network gave them much trouble. The Mongol forces were unable to take any major stone castles or fortified cities and suffered from supply shortages, sallies by local Hungarian forces, and stiff resistance in any castle or town they assaulted. Eventually they were beaten by the Hungarian royal army under Ladislaus IV of Hungary near Pest, and the retreating Mongol forces were ambushed by the Székelys, losing much of their invading force.

Nogai was more successful than Talabuga, staying in Hungary into spring and retaining the bulk of his army, but still suffered several serious reverses at the hands of local Hungarian troops (primary Székelys, Saxons, and Vlachs). He also failed to capture any major fortifications, with the exception of the Saxon castle of Ban Mikod. Nogai's column never came into contact with the royal army, as his losses to the local Hungarian forces in the areas he operated in were sufficiently serious to convince him to retreat prematurely. His column was also ambushed by the Székelys on the return. Overall the campaign was a severe defeat for the Golden Horde and one of Nogai's biggest setbacks; there would be no major incursions into Hungary after it, only raiding along the frontier.

=== Ascension of Talabuga ===
Upon returning from their disastrous campaign in Hungary to the Horde's heartland in 1287, they found Tuda-Mengu Khan sunk in religious torpor. Later in the year, he relinquished the throne to his nephew, Talabuga. Eager to prove himself as a capable ruler and not a puppet of Nogai, and probably wanting to make up for his part of the loss in Hungary, Talabuga immediately launched an invasion against the Ilkhanate, attempting to seize the disputed territory of Azerbaijan. He failed, discrediting him and playing into the hands of his rival Nogai, who was still respected despite his own defeats in Transylvania. Nogai would remain a powerful ruler during Talabuga's brief term as khan of the Golden Horde.

=== Failure in Poland and Circassia and conflict with Talabuga ===
Nogai and Talabuga made a third raid against Poland in 1287/1288 but were defeated by a contingency of Eastern European armies.

Following the unsuccessful raid on Poland, Nogai and Talabuga made another expedition, this time into Circassia. There they pillaged and killed at will. However, on their return to their winter quarters, heavy snows caused Talabuga's army to get lost on the return and suffer greatly. Nogai's army made their way to winter quarters safe and sound. Talabuga blamed this on Nogai.

Nogai and Talabuga had never gotten along, and their quarrelling during the invasions of Poland and Circassia is held by 19th-century Russian historian Nikolay Karamzin to be a major reason for the heavy losses taken in those expeditions. In autumn of 1290, Talabuga, thinking Nogai was conspiring against him, decided to muster an army and march against his general. Nogai decided to feign ignorance, though he knew full well Talabuga's distaste for him; he also sent letters to Talabuga's mother, saying he had personal advice to give to the khan that he could only do alone, essentially requesting a formal meeting of princes. Talabuga's mother advised him to trust Nogai, and subsequently, Talabuga disbanded most of his forces and showed up for a meeting with Nogai with only a small retinue. According to Rashid Al-Din, Nogai received Talabuga warmly and feigned illness to appear more harmless.

However, Nogai was duplicitous; he had arrived at the designated meeting spot accompanied by a large group of soldiers and Tokhta, as well as three sons of Mengu-Timur. While Nogai and Talabuga met, Nogai's men sprung out in an ambush, quickly capturing Talabuga and his supporters; Nogai, with the help of protégés, then strangled Talabuga to death. After this, he turned to the young Tokhta and said: "Talabuga has usurped the throne of your father, and your brothers who are with him have agreed to arrest you and put you to death. I deliver them up to you, and you may do with them as you will." Tokhta subsequently had them killed. For his role in placing Tokhta on the throne, Nogai received the revenues of the Crimean trade cities. Nogai then beheaded many of the Mongol nobles who were supporters of Talabuga, in order to consolidate the rule of his supposed puppet khan. Tokhta was declared khan in early 1291.

== Conflict with Tokhta and death: 1294–1300 ==
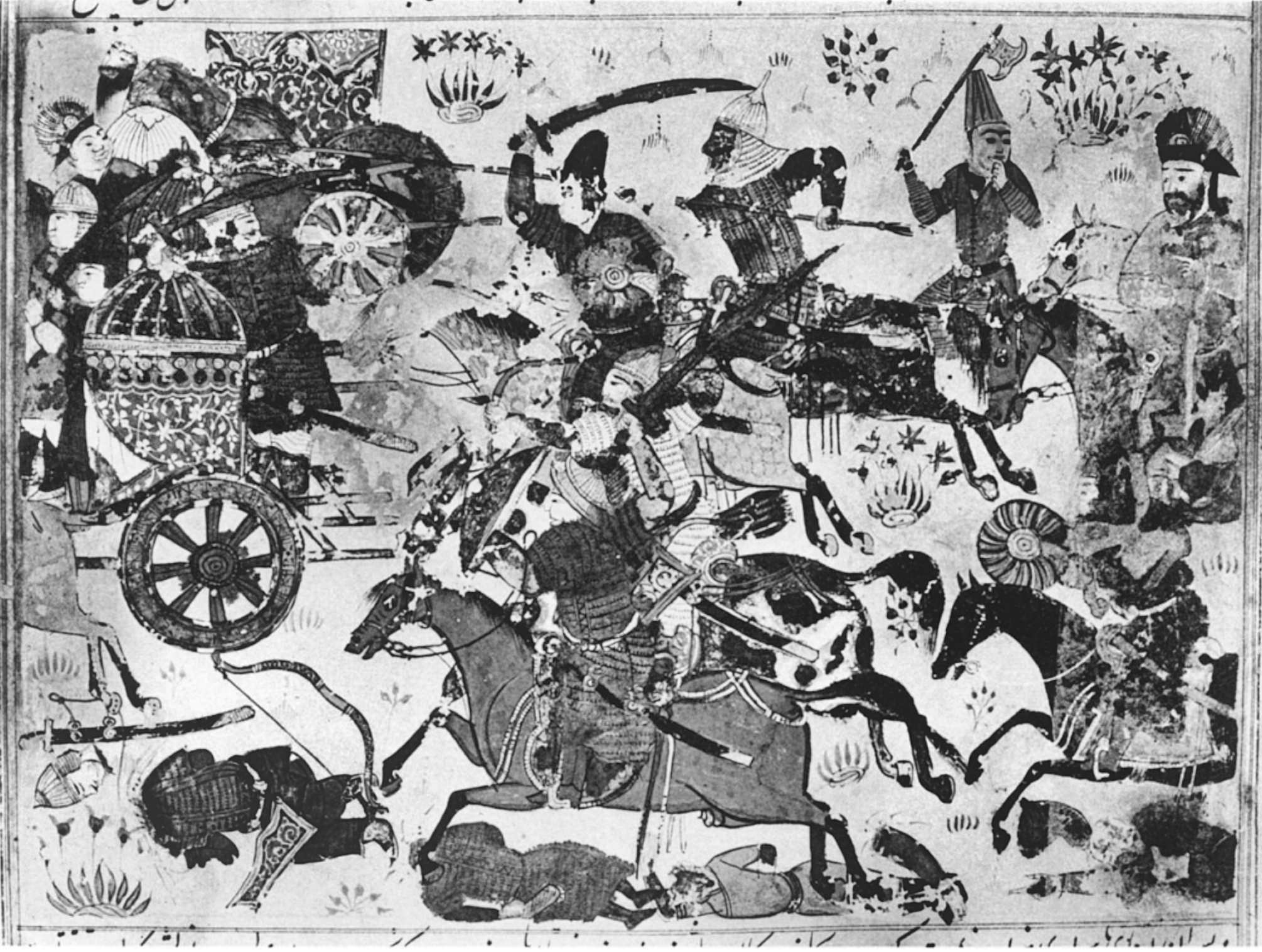
The battle between the armies of Toqta and Nogai in the year 698 (1298-99 CE) on the River Don, in which the former was defeated. Jami al-Tawarikh, late 14th century (Asiatic Society, D.31, Folio 44 recto)

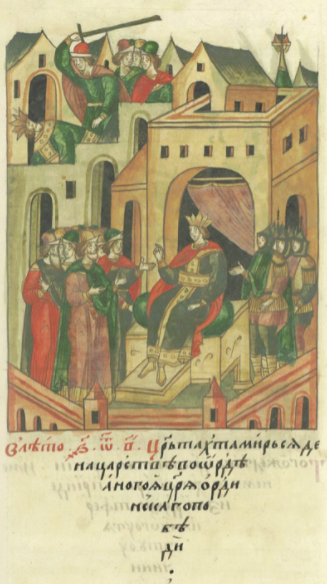
Tokhta ascending the throne of Golden Horde after killing Nogai Khan

However, Tokhta would prove a more headstrong ruler than either Tuda-Mengur or Talabuga. Nogai and Tokhta soon found themselves embroiled in a deadly rivalry; while they cooperated in raids against rebellious Russian principalities, they remained in competition; the Russian chroniclers gave Nogai the title of tsar as he was perceived to be the one in power. Tokhta's father-in-law and wife often complained that Nogai seemed to consider himself superior to Tokhta, and Nogai repeatedly rejected any demands Tokhta made of him to attend his court. They also disagreed over the policy of trading rights for the Genoese and Venetian cities in Crimea. Two years after Nogai installed Tokhta, their rivalry came to a head and Tokhta set out to gather his supporters for a war against Nogai.

=== Battle of Nerghi Plains ===
Tokhta, with more control over the eastern portions of the empire, managed to gather a massive force, larger than Nogai's but reportedly less able at arms owing to the experience of Nogai's men in their wars in Europe. Marco Polo, drawing from Mongol sources, states that Nogai assembled 15 tumens (150,000 men) and Tokhta assembled 20 tumens (200,000 men), but these numbers are likely exaggerated. The two rulers made camp ten miles from each other on the plain of Nerghi in 1297, halfway between Nogai's lands and Tokhta's. One day's rest later, a hard battle ensued lasting most of the day, in which Nogai and Tokhta both personally distinguished themselves in battle (despite the former's age). In the end, Nogai was victorious in spite of his numerical disadvantage. Reportedly, 60,000 of Tokhta's men were killed (nearly a third of his army), but Tokhta himself managed to escape.

=== Battle of Kagamlik ===
However, Tokhta was not yet finished. After a few years he managed to reform his army and raise a larger host with which he confronted Nogai deep within Nogai's own territory, at Kahamlyk (Kagamlik), near the Dnieper. Here in 1299 or 1300, Tokhta finally prevailed, with his army defeating Nogai's. Nogai's sons escaped the battle with 1,000 horsemen, while Nogai was found fleeing with 17 when he was wounded by a Russian soldier in the service of Tokhta. He said: "I am Nogai. Take me to Toqta, who is the Khan." The soldier killed Nogai and brought his head to Tokhta. This enraged Tokhta, angered that a Mongol prince's blood had been shed (he planned to execute Nogai in a bloodless manner in keeping with tradition), had the soldier put to death. Nogai's sons were hunted down and executed soon after.

Despite his power and prowess in battle, Nogai never attempted to seize the Golden Horde khanate for himself, preferring to act as a sort of kingmaker. He served under several Golden Horde Khans: Berke, Mengu-Timur, Tuda-Mengu, Talabuga, and Tokhta.

== Personality and character ==
Rashid Al-Din presents Nogai as both a capable general and as a wily old politician. He was content to remain a kingmaker and the power behind the throne, rather than seizing direct control of the Horde himself. Nogai self-consciously promoted Mongol ways, and took pride in his lineage. Despite this, his religious beliefs apparently followed his diplomatic needs; initially he was a devout Tengrist, like most of the Golden Horde, and remained one even after Berke's conversion to Islam. Later on, in a letter to Egypt in 1271, he claimed to have converted to Islam, and his name was included on a list of converts sent by Berke to the Mamluk Sultan Baibars in 1263. Yet in 1288 he presented Buddhist relics to the Il-Khan Arghun. One of Nogai's wives, Yailaq, regularly visited a Franciscan convent in Qirim (Staryy Krym) and was baptized a Catholic. After Toqta ascended the throne, Nogai married his daughter Qiyat to Yailaq (no relation to Nogai's wife), a Buddhist and son of the tribe commander Salji'udai. Nogai's daughter Qiyat, after her marriage, converted to Islam (Nogai had evidently not raised her as a Muslim).

Nogai's first wife was named Chubei, and his second was named Yailaq, along with the Byzantine princess Euphrosyne. Chubei was described by Rashid Al-Din as "clever and competent". Nogai had two sons by Chubei: Joge (the eldest) and Tige. He had one son named Torai by Yailaq. He also had a daughter named Quiyaq. He had another wife named Alaka with which he had another son, Chaka, who ruled as the tsar of Bulgaria from 1299 to 1300. He was also close friends with Mankus, a Byzantine merchant from Crimea. He arranged and held the marriage ceremony of Mankus's daughter Encona to Theodore Svetoslav of Bulgaria at his court, and his wife Euphrosyne became her god-mother.

== See also ==
- Nogais

== Sources ==
- Bor, Zh. Монгол хийгээд евроазийн дипломат шаштир Боть 2, 2003
- Christian, David (12 March 2018). A History of Russia, Central Asia and Mongolia, Volume II: Inner Eurasia from the Mongol Empire to Today, 1260 - 2000. John Wiley & Sons. ISBN 978-0-631-21038-2.
- Howorth, H.H. "History of the Mongols from the 9th to the 19th Century: Part 2. The So-Called Tartars of Russia and Central Asia. Division 1"
- Vásáry, István (2005). Cumans and Tatars: Oriental Military in the Pre-Ottoman Balkans, 1185–1365. Cambridge: Cambridge University Press. ISBN 9781139444088.
- Lane, George (25 January 2018). A Short History of the Mongols. Bloomsbury Publishing. ISBN 978-1-78673-339-9.
- Saunders, John Joseph (2001). The History of the Mongol Conquests. Routledge & K. Paul.
- Rashid Al-Din (1971). The Successors of Genghis Khan. Translated by John Andrew Boyle. Columbia University Press.
- Vernadsky, G. "Mongols and Russia", Yale University Press, Dec 1953
