= Theodora Palaiologina, Empress of Bulgaria =

Theodora Palaiologina

Empress consort of Bulgaria
- Tenure: 1308–1321; 1324–1330
- Born: Unknown; Byzantine Empire
- Spouse: Theodore Svetoslav; Michael Shishman
- House: Palaiologos
- Father: Michael IX Palaiologos
- Mother: Rita of Armenia

Theodora Palaiologina (Bulgarian: Теодора Палеологина, Greek: Θεοδώρα Παλαιολογίνα, fl. 1308–1330) was a Byzantine princess who became a Bulgarian empress as wife of the emperors Theodore Svetoslav from 1308 to his death in 1321, and Michael Shishman from 1324 to his fall in the Battle of Velbazhd on 28 July 1330.

She was a daughter of the Byzantine emperor Michael IX Palaiologos (r. 1295–1320), son and co-ruler of Andronikos II Palaiologos (r. 1282–1328), and Rita of Armenia who was a daughter of King Leo II of Armenia and Queen Keran. She was a sister of Byzantine emperor Andronikos III Palaiologos (r. 1328–1341).

== Marriage with Theodore Svetoslav ==
Theodore Svetoslav asked to marry her in the end of 1307 in order to end the successful war against the Byzantine Empire which started when he became emperor in 1300. Andronikos II had to agree and also abandon claims on the southern Black Sea towns such as Messembria and Anchialus, which remained within the borders of Bulgaria. The marriage was probably concluded in spring 1308. After the death of Theodore Svetoslav, she remained in Tarnovo. It seems that Theodora had good relations with her step-son and new emperor George II Terter (r. 1321–1322), who was a child of her predecessor Euphrosyne. She stayed in the capital after the early death of George II and the beginning of the rule of the despot of Vidin, Michael Shishman.

== Marriage with Michael Shishman ==
After a successful war with the Byzantines in 1324 the new emperor divorced with his first wife Anna Neda of Serbia and married Theodora. With that move he legitimized his authority and made closer relations with Andronikos III. In May 1327 the alliance was renewed and the contemporaries noted that the negotiations resembled a family meeting rather than being real diplomatic negotiations as Andronikos and his mother Maria (as Rita was known at the Byzantine court) asked Michael Shishman to bring Theodora. The close relationship, however, was also an excuse for the Bulgarian emperor to invade Byzantium in 1328. After the death of Michael Shishman in the battle of Velbazhd it was impossible for Theodora to stay in Tarnovo because after the battle Anna Neda and her son and new emperor Ivan Stephen (r. 1330–1331) returned from exile.

== Final years in Constantinople ==
After living in the country for almost a quarter of a century and being empress twice, Theodora left Bulgaria in the autumn of 1330 and moved to Constantinople. She was very close with the mother of John VI Kantakouzenos (r. 1341–1354), Theodora Palaiologina Angelina. She most likely lived with her mother who was a nun at that time and after her death, Theodora herself became a nun under the monastic name Theodosia. It is known that she had children by Michael Shishman and likely by Theodore Svetoslav, but their names and number is unknown.

== Sources ==
- Fine, John V. A. (1994) [1987]. The Late Medieval Balkans: A Critical Survey from the Late Twelfth Century to the Ottoman Conquest. Ann Arbor, Michigan: University of Michigan Press. ISBN 978-0-472-10079-8.

Theodora Palaiologina, Empress of Bulgaria Palaiologos Born: ? Died: ?
Royal titles
| Preceded by Euphrosyne | Empress consort of Bulgaria; 1308–1321 | Succeeded by Anna Neda |
| Preceded by Anna Neda | Empress consort of Bulgaria; 1324–1330 | Succeeded by Theodora |
