= Patriarch Athanasius of Constantinople =

Patriarch Athanasius of Constantinople may refer to:

- Athanasius I of Constantinople, Ecumenical Patriarch in 1289–1293 and 1303–1310
- Patriarch Athanasius II of Constantinople (r. 1450–1453)
