= Battle of Skafida =

Coordinates: 42°23′01″N 27°38′48″E

- Part of the Byzantine–Bulgarian wars
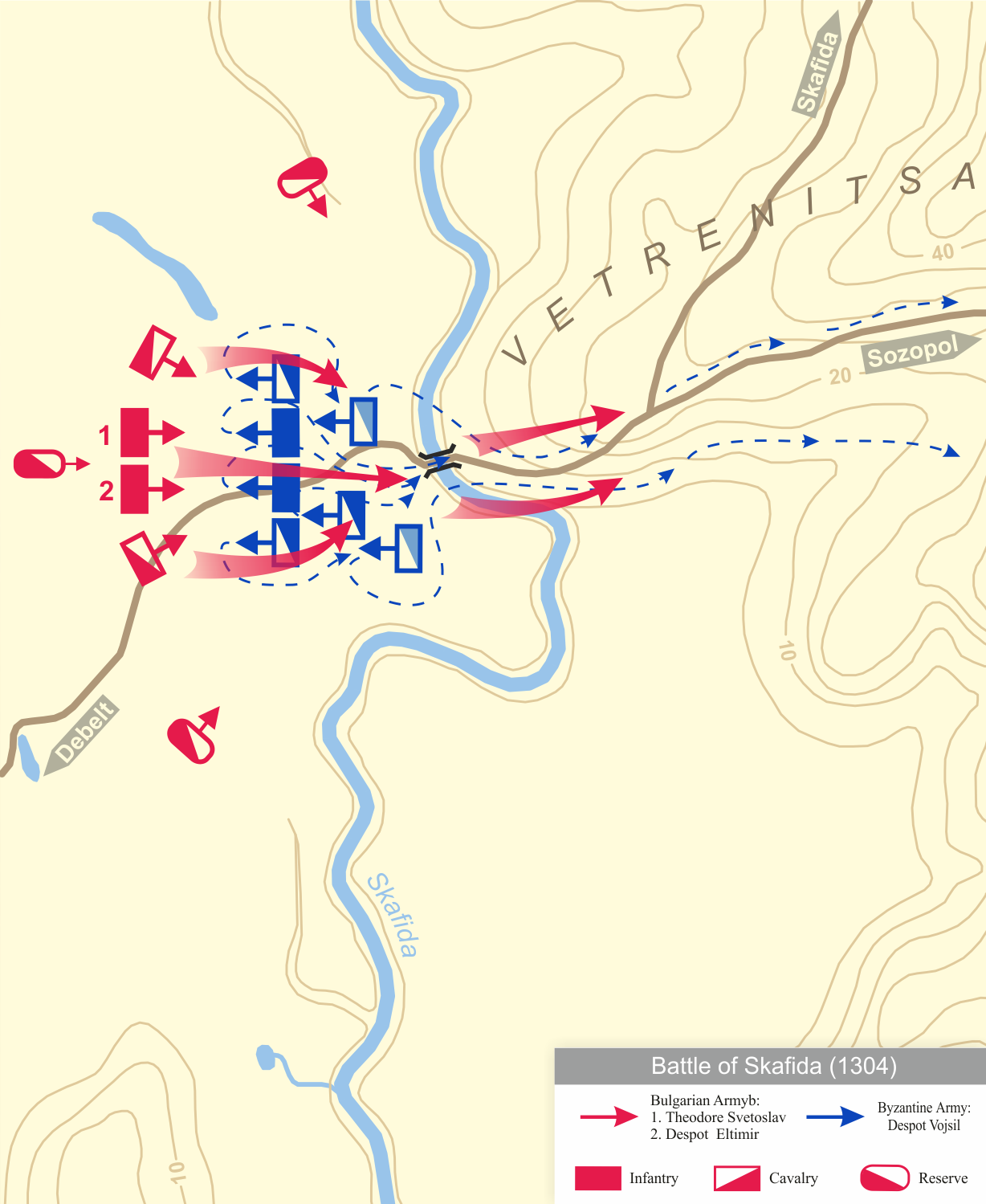
Date	1304
Location	river Skafida, near Sozopolis, Bulgarian Empire
Result	Bulgarian victory

Belligerents
Bulgarian Empire	Byzantine Empire

Commanders and leaders
Theodore Svetoslav; Aldimir	Michael IX Palaiologos

Casualties and losses
Light	Heavy

The Battle of Skafida (Bulgarian: Битка при Скафида) was an engagement between the Bulgarian Empire and the Byzantine Empire which occurred in 1304 near Poros (Burgas), modern Bulgaria. The outcome was Bulgarian victory.

As a result, the Bulgarian Empire overcame the crisis from the end of the 13th century, achieved internal stability and regained most of Thrace. For a time afterwards, Byzantium was not a serious threat to it.

== Origin of the conflict ==
When Theodore Svetoslav was crowned Emperor of Bulgaria in 1300, he sought revenge for the Tatar attacks on the state in the previous 20 years. The traitors were punished first, including Patriarch Joachim III, who was found guilty of helping the enemies of the crown. Then the tsar turned to Byzantium, which had inspired the Tatar invasions and had managed to conquer many Bulgarian fortresses in Thrace. In 1303, his army marched southwards and regained many towns. In the following year the Byzantines counter-attacked and the two armies met near the Skafida river.

== The battle ==
The Byzantines had an advantage in the beginning and managed to push the Bulgarians across the river. They were so infatuated with the chase of the retreating soldiers that they crowded on the bridge, which had been sabotaged before the battle by the Bulgarians, and broke down. The river was very deep at that place and many Byzantine soldiers panicked and drowned, which helped the Bulgarians snatch victory.

== Aftermath ==
After the victory, the Bulgarians captured many Byzantine soldiers and according to custom the ordinary people were released and only the nobles were held for ransom. The Bulgarian army continued its victorious campaign and the enemy could not stop them, although the Byzantine Emperor melted his personal treasure in order to recruit more soldiers. The Byzantines were forced to recognize the territorial gains of Theodore Svetoslav and he married the daughter of Michael IX, Theodora. A peace treaty was signed in 1307 that lasted until Theodore Svetoslav's death in 1321.
