= Michael Doukas Angelos Komnenos Palaiologos =

Michael Doukas Angelos Komnenos Palaiologos can refer to:

- Michael VIII Palaiologos
- Michael IX Palaiologos
