= Rita of Armenia =

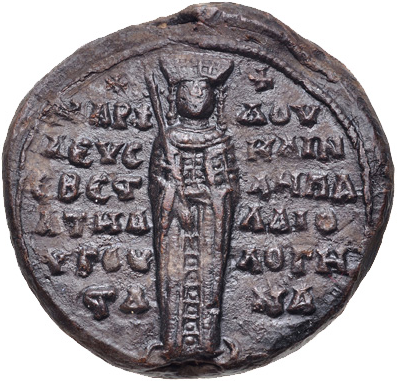
- Seal of Rita of Armenia (under the name Maria Doukaina Palaiologina)

Byzantine Empress consort
- Tenure: 16 January 1294 – 12 October 1320
- Born: 10/11 January 1278
- Died: July 1333 (aged 55)
- Spouse: Michael IX Palaiologos
- Issue: Andronikos III Palaiologos; Manuel Palaiologos, Despotes; Anna Palaiologina, Despoina of Epirus and Countess of Cephalonia; Theodora Palaiologina, Empress of Bulgaria
- Dynasty: Hethumid
- Father: Leo II of Armenia
- Mother: Keran

Rita of Armenia (Greek: Μαρία; 10/11 January 1278 – July 1333) was an Armenian Princess. She was a Byzantine Empress consort by marriage to Michael IX Palaiologos.

She was the daughter of King Leo II of Armenia and Queen Keran. She was the wife of Byzantine co-emperor Michael IX Palaiologos, making her a junior empress-consort of the Byzantine Empire. In 1317, she became the only empress upon the death of the senior empress, Irene of Montferrat. She was known as Maria in Constantinople.

== Life ==
A chronicle attributed to Hetoum II of Armenia is included in the collection known as Recueil des Historiens des Croisades. According to a passage recording her birth, Rita was the twin sister of Theophane.

The history of George Pachymeres records that Andronikos II Palaiologos began negotiations with Leo while seeking a potential wife for his son and junior co-ruler Michael IX Palaiologos. Leo offered him Rita, and the marriage took place on 16 January 1294. The bride was sixteen years old and the groom seventeen.

Rita assumed the name Maria upon her marriage.

=== Empress ===
Rita was the junior empress consort from 1294 to 1317. The senior was Irene of Montferrat, second wife of Andronikos II and stepmother to Michael IX. Since 1303, Andronikos II and Irene held separate courts. The senior emperor resided in Constantinople and the senior empress in Thessaloniki. Rita became the only empress when Irene died in 1317.

She remained so for three years. In 1320, however, the death of her second son resulted in tragedy. Prince Andronikos maintained a mistress but suspected her of infidelity. He assigned retainers of his to wait by her house and attack whoever tried to enter. The one who approached was Manuel during night time and the retainers failed to recognize him. The second prince died by order of his older brother.

The affair seriously affected the health of Michael IX who died on 12 October 1320. Both deaths strained the relationship between Andronikos II and Andronikos III. Grandfather and grandson started a civil war that would last until the victory of the younger man in 1328. Meanwhile, the widowed Rita retired to a monastery, where she assumed the name "Xene". She died there five years following the end of the war.

== Issue ==
- Andronikos III Palaiologos (25 March 1297 – 15 June 1341).
- Manuel Palaiologos, despotes (died 1320).
- Anna Palaiologina (died 1320), who married Thomas I Komnenos Doukas and then Nicholas Orsini.
- Theodora Palaiologina (died after 1330), who married Theodore Svetoslav of Bulgaria and then Michael Asen III of Bulgaria.

Rita of Armenia Hetoumids Born: 1278 Died: 1333
Royal titles
Preceded by Irene of Montferrat	Byzantine Empress consort 16 January 1294 – 12 October 1320 with Irene of Montferrat (1294–1317)	Succeeded by Irene of Brunswick
