= Euphrosyne Palaiologina (daughter of Michael VIII) =

Wife of Nogai Khan

- Spouse: Nogai Khan
- House: Palaiologos (illegitimate)
- Father: Michael VIII Palaiologos
- Mother: Diplovatatzina

Euphrosyne Palaiologina (Greek: Ευφροσύνη Παλαιολογίνα) was an illegitimate daughter of Byzantine Emperor Michael VIII Palaiologos and his mistress Diplovatatzina, who married Nogai Khan in order to form a Byzantine–Mongol alliance. She was named after goddess Euphrosyne, and was also known as Irene.

== Biography ==
In 1266, Emperor Michael VIII Palaiologos, anxious to make an alliance, gave his daughter Euphrosyne to Nogai Khan of the Golden Horde as a wife, after the latter had invaded Thrace a year earlier.

George Pachymeres reported that during the Uprising of Ivaylo, Euphrosyne contacted her family in Constantinople to inform them that Ivaylo had arrived in the Golden Horde. Consequently, Michael VIII sent his son-in-law to Nogai, the former Bulgarian king Ivan Asen III who was married to Euphrosyne's half-sister Irene Palaiologina. Divided between the two contenders for the Bulgarian crown, Nogai initially hesitated and delayed his decision. However, Euphrosyne sided with Ivan Asen III, and Ivaylo was killed during a feast attended by both contenders. Later on, Euphrosyne requested from her husband to spare Ivan Asen III, the second pretender to the Bulgarian throne, from execution, which allowed him to flee to Asia Minor.

Euphrosyne had arranged the marriage of Crimean merchant Pandoleon's daughter, Euphrosyne of Bulgaria, to Theodore Svetoslav, who lived as a hostage in the khan's court. Pandoleon was a close friend of Khan Nogai. Therefore, Pantaleon was honored to have his daughter baptized by Euphrosyne's name.

Euphrosyne kept acting for the interests of Constantinople, in which she supported Andronikos II Palaiologos. She also strengthened the position of Theodore Svetoslav, and went against Smiltsena Palaiologina who sought an alliance with Serbian King Stefan Milutin.

Khan Nogai was killed in 1299/1300 by the Mongols of Toqta in the battle of Kagamlik, near the Dnieper. The fate of Euphrosyne Palaeologina around these events is unknown. It is possible that she died before her husband, fell victim to power struggles in the Golden Horde after his death, or was sent back to Constantinople.

== Personal life ==
Euphrosyne and Nogai are not known to have had children.

Her sister Maria Palaiologina married Abaqa Khan of Ilkhanid Persia. She was the step-mother of Chaka.
