= Anna Palaiologina =

Anna Palaiologina (Greek: Ἅννα Παλαιολογίνα) may refer to:

- Anna of Hungary (c. 1260–1281), Byzantine empress-consort, 1273–1281
- Anna Komnene Palaiologina (c. 1260–c.1300), daughter of Michael VIII, wife of Demetrios Doukas Komnenos Koutroules
- Anna of Savoy (1306–1365), Byzantine empress-consort, 1326–1341
- Anna Palaiologina (daughter of Michael IX) (died 1320), queen-consort of Epirus, ca. 1307–1320
- Anna Palaiologina (daughter of Andronikos Angelos Palaiologos) (died after 1363), queen-consort of Epirus, ca. 1323–1338
- Anna of Moscow (1393–1417), Byzantine empress-consort, 1414–1417
- Anna Palaiologina Notaras (died 1507), daughter of Loukas Notaras
