= Euphrosyne of Bulgaria =

Bulgarian empress consort

Euphrosyne

Empress consort of Bulgaria
- Tenure: 1300–1308
- Died: before 1308
- Spouse: Theodore Svetoslav
- Father: Manux

Euphrosyne (died before 1308) was Bulgarian empress consort (tsarina), first wife of tzar Theodore Svetoslav of Bulgaria.

The date of her birth is unknown. She was the daughter and heiress of the rich Manux (Mankus), who was a son of Pandoleon, a Byzantine merchant from Crimea and a close friend of Nogai Khan, the effective leader of the Mongol Golden Horde. George Pachymeres records that the birth name of Euphrosyne was Encona or Enconen but later she adopted the name of her god-mother Euphrosyne Palaiologina, the Byzantine wife of Nogai Khan, who was herself an illegitimate daughter of Emperor Michael VIII Palaiologos.

Euphrosyne married Theodore Svetoslav of Bulgaria at the court of Nogai Khan, to where he was sent by his father as hostage in about 1289. Perhaps in connection with the same events, Theodore Svetoslav's sister, Elena, married Nogai's son Chaka. During part of his exile, Theodore Svetoslav became impoverished and sought to improve his fortunes by marrying the rich Euphrosyne. The marriage was arranged by Euphrosene Palaiologina in order to improve the position of Svetoslav in the Mongolian court and to gain support for Svetoslav against her cousin Smiltsena Palaiologina, who ruled in Tarnovo as regent of Ivan II, son of the late Tsar Smilets.

The husband of Euphrosyne left obscurity in 1298 or 1299, when he, accompanied by his brother-in-law Chaka, invaded Bulgaria. The regency for Ivan II fled Tarnovo in 1299, and the gold of Theodore Svetoslav's wife convinced the Bulgarian nobility to open the city gate and to accept Chaka as ruler. However, the armies of the new khan of the Golden Horde Toqta entered Bulgaria in pursuit of his enemy Chaka, and Theodore Svetoslav promptly organized a plot, deposing Chaka and having him strangled in prison in 1300. Theodore Svetoslav now became emperor of Bulgaria and sent Chaka's severed head as a present to Toqta, who withdrew his armies from the country.

After the ascension of Theodor Svetoslav, Euphrosyne was proclaimed as the new empress consort (tsarina) of Bulgaria. According to the Bulgaria historian Plamen Pavlov, at this time Euphrosyne was the first crowned woman in Medieval Europe, who belonged to the third estate.

The date of her death is unknown, but in 1308 Theodore married the Byzantine princess Theodora Palaiologina.

The memory of Euphrosyne is honored in the Synodic of Bulgarian Church (Obituary of Borill):

For Euphrosyne, the pious tsarina of tsar Svetoslav, may her memory live forever.

== Family ==
Euphrosyne and Theodore Svetoslav had at least one child, the future tsar George II of Bulgaria.

== Sources ==
- Pavlov, Plamen (2006). Българските царици [Bulgarian queens] (in Bulgarian). Велико Търново: ДАР-РХ. ISBN 954-9489-04-3.

Euphrosyne of Bulgaria Terter Born: ? Died: ?
Royal titles
Preceded by Elena, wife of Chaka	Empress consort of Bulgaria; 1299–1308	Succeeded by Theodora Palaiologina
