= Michael IX Palaiologos =

Byzantine emperor from 1294 to 1320

- Emperor and Autocrat of the Romans
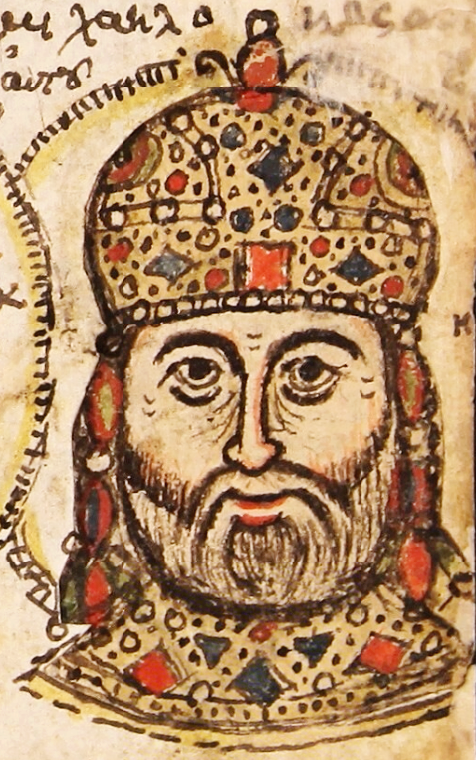
- 15th-century portrait from a 15th-century codex containing a copy of the Extracts of History by Joannes Zonaras

Byzantine emperor
- Reign: 21 May 1294 – 12 October 1320
- Coronation: 21 May 1294, Hagia Sophia
- Predecessor: Andronikos II (alone)
- Successor: Andronikos II (alone); Andronikos III (in Macedonia)
- Co-emperor: Andronikos II
- Proclamation: 1281 (as co-emperor)
- Born: 17 April 1277; Constantinople (now Istanbul, Turkey)
- Died: 12 October 1320 (aged 43); Thessaloniki, Greece
- Spouse: Rita of Armenia (m. 1294)
- Issue: Andronikos III Palaiologos; Manuel Palaiologos, Despotes; Anna Palaiologina, Despoina of Epirus and Countess of Cephalonia; Theodora Palaiologina, Empress of Bulgaria
Names
- Michael Doukas Angelos Komnenos Palaiologos; Byzantine Greek: Μιχαὴλ Δούκας Ἄγγελος Κομνηνὸς Παλαιολόγος
- Dynasty: Palaiologos
- Father: Andronikos II Palaiologos
- Mother: Anna of Hungary

Michael IX Palaiologos or Palaeologus (Byzantine Greek: Μιχαὴλ Δούκας Ἄγγελος Κομνηνὸς Παλαιολόγος, romanized: Mikhaḗl Doúkās Ángelos Komnēnós Palaiológos; 17 April 1277 – 12 October 1320) was Byzantine emperor together with his father, Andronikos II Palaiologos, from 1294 until his death. Andronikos II and Michael IX ruled as equal co-rulers, both using the title autokrator.

A man of impeccable morals and a good helper to his father, he was also known as a brave and energetic soldier, willing to make personal sacrifices to pay or encourage his troops; the Catalan military chronicler Ramon Muntaner said about him: "Emperor Michael was one of the bravest knights in the world". Despite his military prestige, he suffered several defeats, for unclear reasons: his inability as a commander, the deplorable state of the Byzantine army or just simply bad luck.

His premature death at age 43 was attributed in part to grief over the accidental murder of his younger son Manuel Palaiologos by retainers of his older son and later co-emperor Andronikos III Palaiologos.

In the memory of the Byzantines, Michael IX remained "the most pious lord" and "a true emperor in name and deeds".

== Birth and early years ==
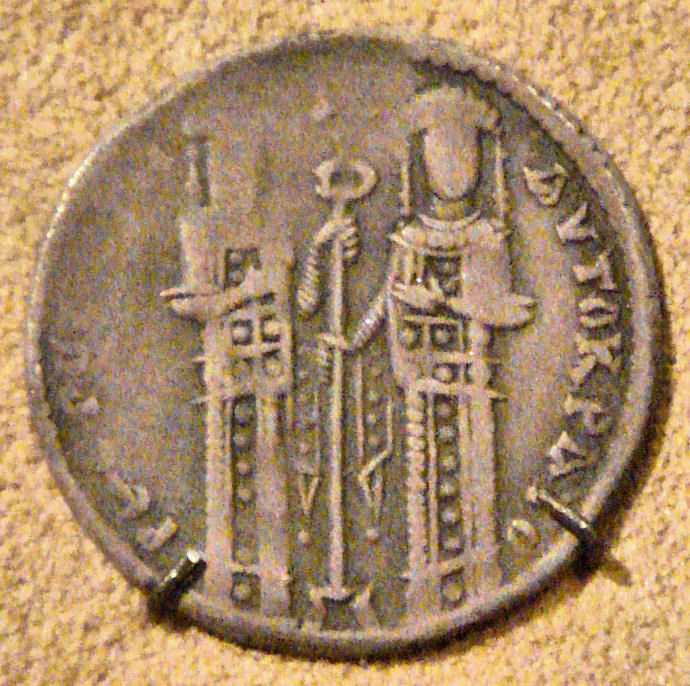
Michael IX and Andronikos II (Silver basilikon).

Michael IX was the eldest son of the Byzantine Emperor Andronikos II Palaiologos and his first wife Anna, daughter of King Stephen V of Hungary. He was born at noon on Easter Sunday (17 April) of 1277, which was recognized by the people as a miracle. The Emperor doted on his firstborn son, which became a great consolation for him after the untimely death of his beloved wife Anna in 1281. Michael IX had only one younger full-brother, Constantine, who was born sometime between 1278 and 1281.

Andronikos II declared Michael IX an emperor shortly before the death of Michael VIII in 1282, and after his son became an adult, he confirmed his authority. On 21 May 1294 at Hagia Sophia, Michael IX was crowned by Patriarch John XII of Constantinople. In subsequent years, Andronikos II entrusted his son with the conduct of wars against internal and external enemies.

== Military activity ==
=== Clash at Magnesia (1302) ===
In early spring of 1302, Michael IX made his first campaign against the Ottoman Empire, which he was very proud of in advance, for he had long wanted (as the historian George Pachymeres reports) to get a chance to prove himself in battle. Under his command, up to 16,000 soldiers were collected, 10,000 of whom were a detachment of mercenary Alans; the latter, however, performed their duty badly and plundered both the Turkish population and the Greek with equal zeal. Michael IX camped at the fortress of Magnesia ad Sipylum in Asia Minor (modern day Manisa, Turkey), not far from Smyrna, where in ancient times a great battle between the Roman Republic and the Seleucid Empire had taken place. Seeing the low morale of his people, Michael IX didn't dare to start the battle first, since the Turks managed to take all advantageous positions —the peaks of the surrounding mountains and shelters in the forests— and at the very first collision he would have easily repulsed the onslaught of Greek militia and light Alanian cavalry. Another reason why the young emperor gave his enemies the opportunity to attack first was the problems in his own army. Wayward mercenaries didn't want to carry out his orders, and, according to Nicephorus Gregoras

...often without any order they went out to prey and themselves devastated Roman possessions even more than obvious enemies.

Meanwhile, the Turks chose the moment and descended from the mountains. Michael IX ordered to prepare for battle, but no one listened to him — the timid soldiers didn't want to start the battle and thought only about flight, as was recalled by Nicephorus Gregoras:

Ours did not wait for the first attack of the enemies and, having withdrawn from there, walked with a quiet step, having barbarians in their rear, who followed them and camped in the closest distance from them. Ours did not even see how great the number of enemies; cowardice happened to them, what happens to drunkards: drunkards see not what it really is, but imagine that it is something else ... Before the enemies have time to attack them, they themselves are already running away from their cowardice ... The Emperor, seeing that the Massagets (that is, the Alans) fled and unable to resist the barbarians with a small number of soldiers, locked himself in the hardest fortress, Magnesia, and limited himself to just observing how it would end. The Massagetae reach the Hellespont itself, devastating all the fields of Christians, and from there they move to Europe.

After defeat and a short stay in the fortress of Magnesia, Michael IX retreated to Pergamum and then went to Adramyttium, where he met the New Year of 1303, and by the summer he was in the city of Cyzicus. He still didn't give up his attempts to gather a new army to replace the disintegrated old one and to improve the situation. But by that time the Turks had already seized the area along the lower reaches of the Sangarios River and defeated another Greek army in the town of Bapheus, near Nicomedia (27 July 1302). It was becoming clear to everyone that the Byzantines had lost the war. To top it all off, Michael IX fell seriously ill; having reached the Pegai fortress, he could not continue and went to bed. Many felt that his days were numbered; dying, he sadly watched as the conquerors divided the Byzantine lands that they had captured to the very coast of the Aegean Sea. A year later, the Turkish commander Aydin captured the city of Ephesus (24 October 1304) and, briefly, the island of Rhodes.

Michael IX was ill during the last months of 1303. His health recovered only by January 1304, so that he was finally able to leave the fortress and return to Constantinople with his wife Rita, who, after learning about his illness, hurried to Pegai and was devotedly at the side of her husband during all his illness.

=== Battle of Skafida (1304) ===
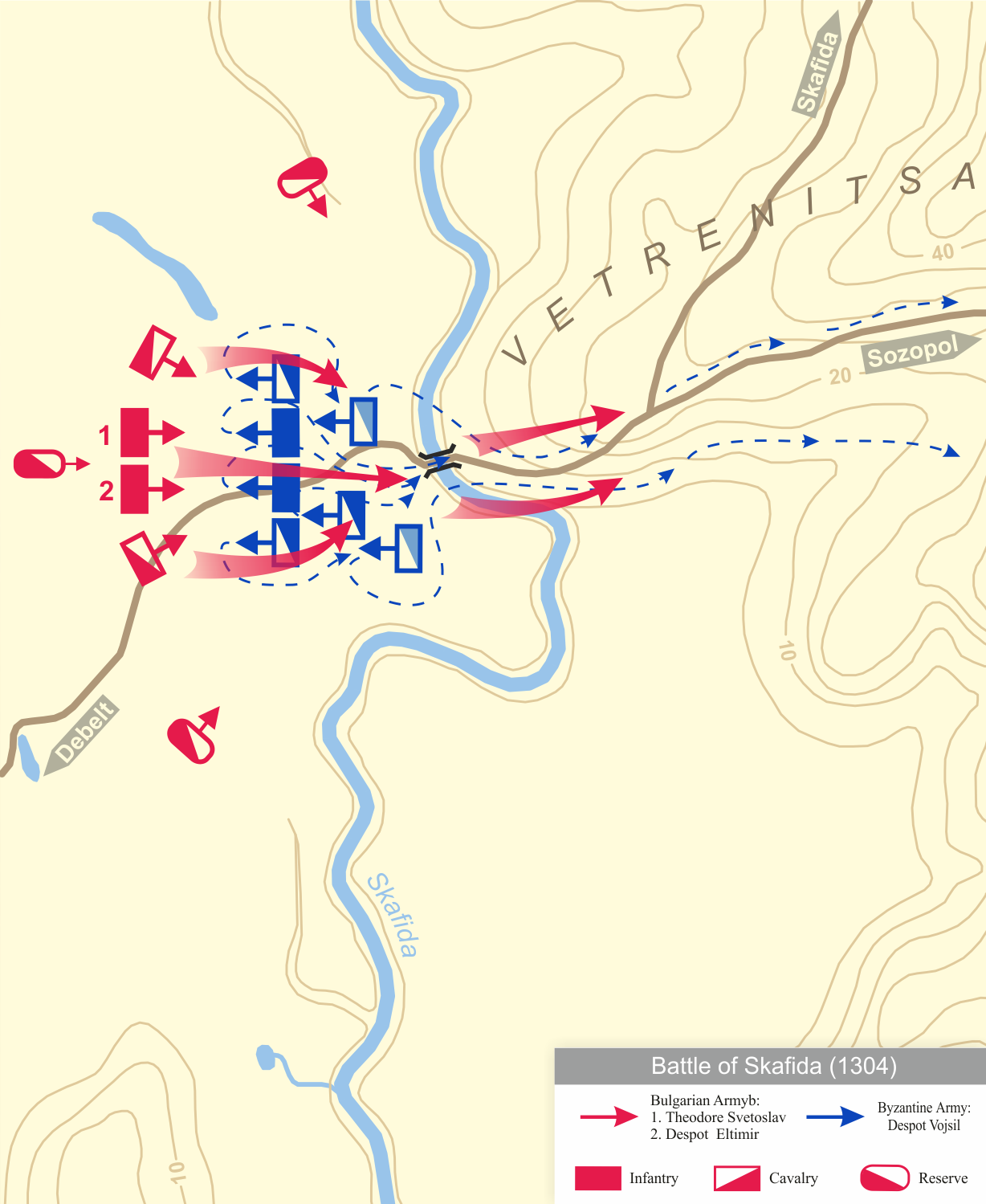
Battle of Skafida.

During 1303–1304 Tsar Theodore Svetoslav of Bulgaria invaded Eastern Thrace. Michael IX at this time was engaged in a war with the rebellious Catalan Company (see below), whose leader, Roger de Flor, refused to fight the Bulgarians if Michael IX and his father didn't pay him the agreed sum of money. In order to prevent the unification of the Catalans and Bulgarians, Michael IX had to oppose the latter, sharing authority over the army with the experienced commander Michael Glaber, who, however, fell seriously ill by the decisive battle and was removed from military affairs. By that time, the Bulgarians had already managed to conquer the fortresses of Kopsis, Kryn, Meglij, Vereya, Diavena, Ichera, Mokren, Sliven, Sotir, Pyrgitsion, Diampol, Ktenia, Debelt, Rusokastro, Lardea, Markeli, Aytos, Mesembria, Anchialos, Pyrgos, Apolonia and Ahtopol, all along the southern Black Sea coast. However, subsequent events were initially favorable for the Byzantine Empire.

Michael IX defeated the enemies in several skirmishes, after which many fortresses captured by the Bulgarians surrendered to him without a fight. His successes made an impression in Constantinople, where Patriarch Athanasius I, during a sermon, said a word of praise about Michael IX and his victories. There is also a panegyric in which an unknown poet extols the victories of the Byzantine army at that time.

In early autumn 1304 the Byzantines counter-attacked and the two armies met near Skafida river. At the beginning of the battle, Michael IX, who fought bravely in the forefront, had an advantage over the enemy. He forced the Bulgarians to retreat along the road to Apolonia, but he was unable to keep his own soldiers heated up in pursuit. Between the Byzantines and the fleeing Bulgarians, there was the deep and very turbulent Skafida river, with the only bridge across which was damaged by the Bulgarians before the battle. When the Byzantine soldiers in a large crowd tried to cross the bridge, it collapsed. Many of the soldiers drowned, the rest began to panic. At that moment, the Bulgarians returned to the bridge and decided the outcome of the battle, snatching victory from the enemies.

Several hundred Byzantines were captured. To ransom the captives and recruit a new army, Emperor Andronikos II and his son were forced to sell their own jewelry. With varying degrees of success, hostilities continued for several more years until 1307, when a peace that was clearly unfavorable for the Byzantine Empire was concluded, which remained for the next 15 years; as part of the agreement, Michael IX had to give his daughter Theodora in marriage to the Bulgarian Tsar Theodore Svetoslav, his successful enemy.

=== Battle of Apros (1305) ===
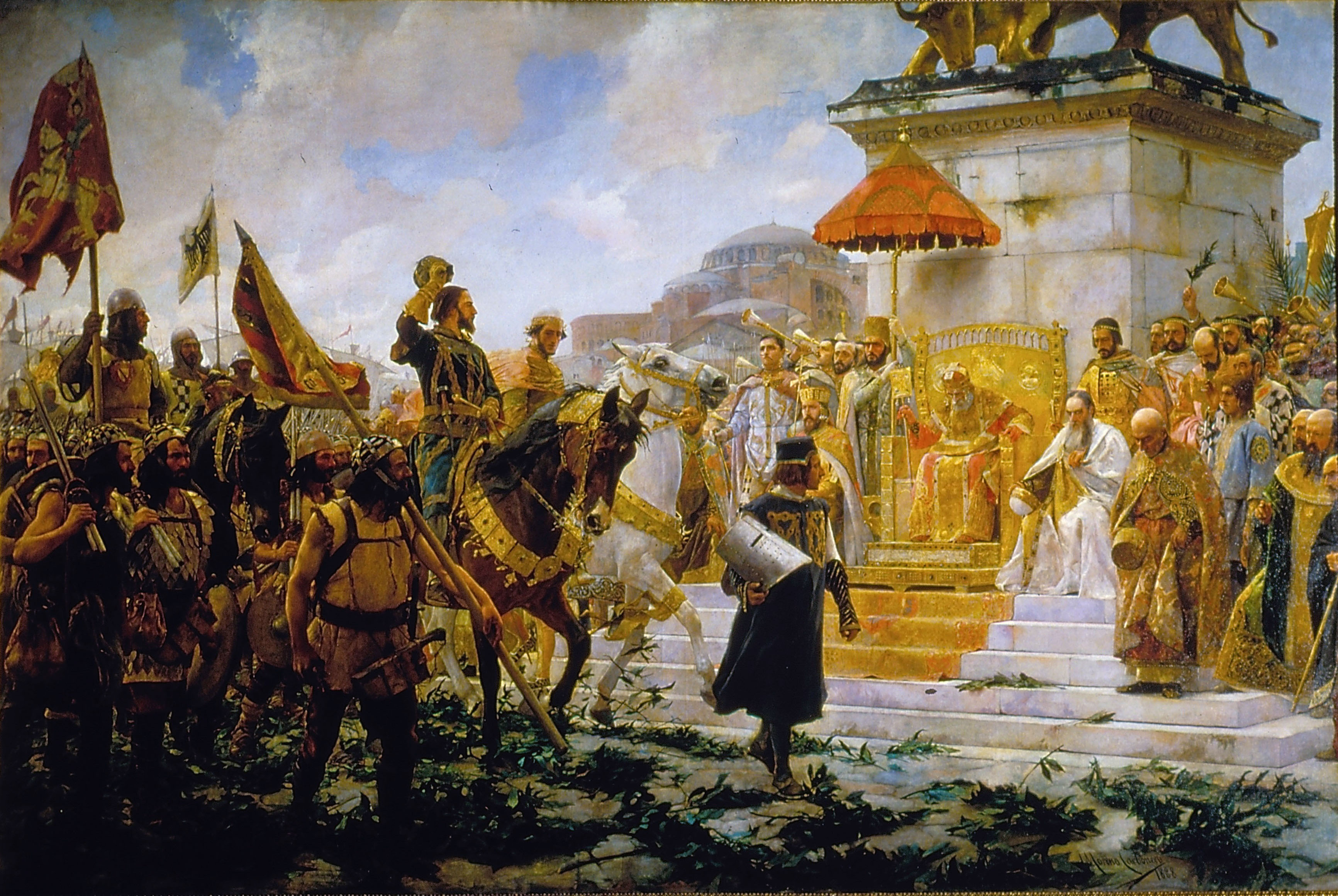
Entry of Roger de Flor in Constantinople by José Moreno Carbonero, 1888. Palacio del Senado, Spain.

In the spring of 1305 Michael IX, on his father's instructions, conducted negotiations in Adrianople with the rebellious Catalan condottieri Roger de Flor. According to Nicephorus Gregoras, Roger tried to play a dishonest game: he plundered Greek settlements, made sure that he was given ownership of all of Anatolia with the islands and incomes with the right to distribute fiefs to his vassals and maintain a personal army, and demanded from the Byzantine emperors a salary for his soldiers in the amount of 100,000 gold and extorted another 300,000. (For comparison: during the "War of the Two Andronikos" Andronikos the Younger needed only 45,000 gold to maintain his army):

...leaving the other soldiers in the fortress of Gallipoli, with 200 others, chosen ones, [he decided] to go to Emperor Michael, who was then with an army in Thrace, and demand from him the annual salary due to him with his retinue, and if necessary, then and threaten him. When he did this, the Emperor flared up with anger, which, however, had long been hiding in Roger's soul for a long time, and the soldiers who surrounded the Emperor in large numbers, drawing their swords, immediately hacked Roger and, along with him, some of his companions, near the Imperial headquarters. But most of them fled and hastened to notify the Catalans who were in Gallipoli about the incident.

According to other sources, the Catalan condottieri was insidiously killed in a palace in Adrianople during a night drinking with the Byzantine commanders by an Alan teenager named Hyrkon, whose father had been killed by Roger de Flor a few weeks earlier. Ramon Muntaner, unlike Nicephorus Gregoras, speaks only of the three Catalans who survived and names them by name, adding that before the massacre, Michael IX envied Roger de Flor because of his impressive victories over the Turks. It's also known that Michael IX and Roger de Flor were in conflict with each other: so, back in 1303, de Flor with his people arrived in Pegai, where the sick Michael IX was, but he ordered not to let the Catalans into the fortress and refused to accept their leader. It is unclear, however, whether Michael IX was guilty of the murder, or whether everything happened spontaneously and without preparation. In favor of the latter, was that the Catalans and Byzantines drank almost the entire week before the fatal incident happened (30 April 1305). However, for the several thousand angry Catalans who remained in Gallipoli, the details of the massacre didn't matter. Their new leaders, the "megadux" Berenguer VI de Entenza and the brave warrior Bernat de Rocafort, like monarchs of an independent power, sent a proud embassy to Constantinople declaring war, as demanded by knightly etiquette. Andronikos II, who did not want war, had to make excuses before two seekers of glory and asking him to believe that de Flor was not killed by his order. But his opponents didn't want to listen to anything. 5,000 Catalans, angry with the Byzantines, united with a Turkish detachment of 500 warriors, fortified in Gallipoli, instantly cutting off all the Greek townspeople, and began to raid Thrace, plundering it day and night. Rocafort took the fortresses of Rodosto and Panido: their population was killed or sold into slavery. Other leaders of the mercenaries settled in Gallipoli — Ramon Muntaner, the future historiographer of the "great campaign", and Fernando Jimenez, who later went over with his detachment to the Byzantines. Since their insolence at that time seemed completely unbearable, Michael IX, taking all the Thracian and Macedonian regiments, the Alan auxiliary cavalry and also adding to them about 1,000 Turcopoles (baptized Turks), led by their commander Melekh, approached the Apros fortress (ancient Theodosiopolis), the plain east of which was occupied by the enemy. In total, under his leadership, about 14,000 soldiers were collected (according to other sources 40,000) against 5 or 6,000 Catalans and several hundred Turks:

Several days later, some of the inspectors came with the news that the enemies were close. The Emperor stood up and ordered the army to arm itself, and the leaders and commanders to line up and prepare for battle phalanxes with their closest commanders. Seeing that the enemies lined up in three phalanxes, they themselves did the same. The Turcopoles with the Massagets (Alans) made up the left wing, on the right were selected horsemen from the Thracians and Macedonians, and in the middle the rest, a very large part of the cavalry, together with the infantry. The Emperor, circling the ranks, encouraged the soldiers to courageously attack. With sunrise, the enemies came up and lined up opposite, having Turks on both wings, and Catalan heavily armed phalanxes in the middle because of their sluggishness.

But as soon as the signal for battle was given, the Catalans rushed into battle with the cry "Aragon! Aragon! Saint George!", as the memorable defeat at Magnesia was repeated. The Turcopoles and Alans suddenly left the battlefield. Such a surprise took all the courage from the Byzantines. Michael IX, seeing that the ranks of his soldiers were mingled, with tears turned to them, begging them to stand firm. But they didn't listen to him at all and rushed to run without looking back. Only about a hundred knights remained with the emperor. Most of the infantry was badly battered by the Catalans, who rushed to pursue the Byzantines.

In the middle of such desperate situation, Michael IX carried himself with great courage:

Seeing that things had come to a desperate situation, and that most of the infantry had been mercilessly hacked and trampled, the Emperor found it quite decent at this time not to spare himself for his subjects and, having rushed into obvious danger, thereby shaming the treacherous soldiers. Therefore, turning to those around him (there were very few of them), he said: Gentlemen! Now is the time when death is better than life, and life is worse than death. Having said this and summoning divine help, he rushes with them to the enemies and kills some of them who came to hand, tears the phalanx and thereby causes considerable confusion in the enemy army. The arrows rained down on him as on the horse, but he remained intact. When his horse fell, he found himself in danger of being surrounded by enemies, and perhaps it would have come to such a misfortune if one of those who were with him, out of love for his sovereign, he did not sacrifice his life for him, giving him his horse. Through this, the Emperor was saved from the danger that was already hanging over him; and the one who gave him his horse fell under the enemy's horses and lost his life.

Michael IX retreated to Didymoteicho, where he met Andronikos II, who gave his son a long and severe reprimand, since he unnecessarily exposed himself to mortal risk. At the same time, the co-Emperor became the object of brutal attacks from his stepmother the Empress Irene (born Yolanda of Montferrato), who hated him, since he was the heir in detriment of her sons. As for the victorious Catalans, for the next two years they freely plundered Thrace, then devastated Macedonia and, finally, left to seek glory in Thessaly and central Greece.

The state of affairs in Asia, where the Turks managed to cut the line of communication between Nicomedia and Nicaea (1307), was not the best either.

=== Turkish fortress (1314) ===
After the Catalans left in 1314 Thrace, in turn, began to be devastated by the Ottoman Turks. At one time, they accompanied the Catalans, who ravaged Macedonia and Central Greece with fire and sword, and now with their share of the booty were returning home. The Turks asked permission to pass through the Byzantine regions, which they were allowed, but Andronikos II, amazed by the amount of booty and the small number of Turks, decided, without stopping to talk about friendship and alliance, to suddenly hit them and take away all the booty. The plan failed due to the negligence of the Byzantine generals, who acted too slowly and openly. The Turks, once were revealed the intentions of the Byzantines, without hesitation, attacked the nearest fortress, fortified it and, having received help from Asia, began to plunder the country.

Michael IX had to gather an army (they collected everyone they could, including ordinary peasants who made up most of the Byzantine army) and lay siege to the fortress. The Byzantines were confident of their success, since they far outnumbered their enemies: the Turks were only 1,300 cavalry and 800 infantry, but as soon as the Turkish horsemen appeared, led by their chief named Halil, the peasants suddenly fled. Then, little by little, the rest of the Byzantine soldiers began to scatter. When Michael IX tried to put the army in order, there was absolutely no one who could listen to him. In despair, he himself, in tears, took to flight, trembling with impotent rage and thinking that all this was God's clear punishment for old and new sins. The adversaries captured many Byzantine nobles, the imperial treasury, crown (the so-called calipra) and tent; sneering at the defeated Emperor, the Turkish chief Halil placed the crown of the Byzantine Basileus on his own head.

The young talented military leader Philes Palaeologus saved the situation, asking the Emperors for permission to independently recruit troops and commanders to fight the Turks. Having selected a small detachment of the most combat-ready and brave, Philes, a warrior weak in body but strong in spirit, near the river Xirogypsus successfully destroyed 1,200 Ottomans who were returning to the fortress with booty and Greek captives, and after the arrival of reinforcements from the Genoese allied to Constantinople with small losses forced the fortress to surrender.

=== Michael IX as unsuccessful commander ===
Alanian, Turkish, Catalan, Serbian mercenary detachments and at times simple peasant militias were the only warriors at the head of which Michael IX had to repulse the enemy. The fact is that the military organization of the Byzantine Empire by that time was actually destroyed after the initiatives carried out by Andronikos II.

Andronikos II, a purely civilian man, considered it unreasonably expensive (taking into account the impoverishment of the treasury) and inexpedient (taking into account the greatly reduced empire within the borders) the maintenance of a regular national army. In theory, her role could be handled by a professional detachment of mercenaries, which (again in theory) was much cheaper to maintain. Andronikos II and his advisers didn't confine themselves to mere arguments. Their own armed forces were soon disbanded, and instead of them, mercenaries were entrusted to guard the borders of the Byzantine Empire. But the commanders were unable to curb cowardice, greed and rebelliousness in their new soldiers, turning into open rebellion and disobedience in a number of cases, which strongly questioned the empire's ability to repel enemies and ultimately led to its destruction.

Obedient to his father, Michael IX turned out to be not the person who could radically change the existing system and win victories, commanding the peasant militia and the multi-tribal mercenary rabble, with whom even an outstanding commander could hardly cope and achieve much. It is curious that Philes Palaeologus, the only Byzantine military leader who achieved victory under Michael IX, began by completely refusing to deal with mercenaries and peasant "warriors". Therefore, Michael IX was hardly to blame for his own military failures: they seem to be a natural consequence of the suicidal military transformations carried out in the Byzantine Empire at that time.

== Private life ==
=== Betrothals and marriage. Issue ===
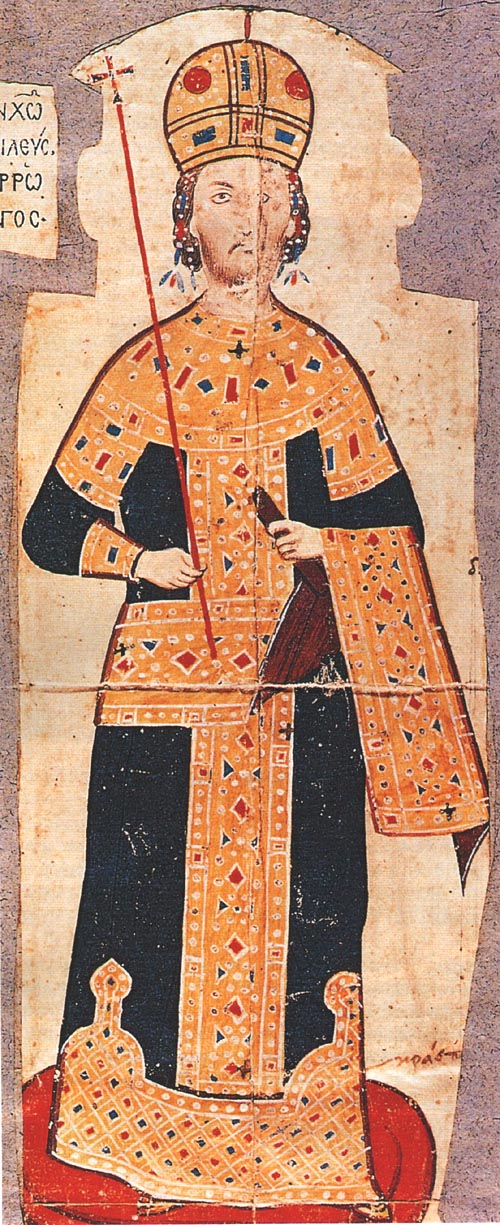
Andronikos III Palaiologos, 14th-century miniature.

In 1288 Michael IX was betrothed with Catherine of Courtenay, titular Latin Empress of Constantinople. The marriage was proposed by Andronikos II in the hope of reducing the threat of restoring the power of the Latins in the Byzantine Empire and reconciling with both the Holy See and the European monarchs, who frightened Constantinople with a new Crusade; however, after several years of fruitless negotiations and the decisive objection from the French king, the purposed union was abandoned by 1295, when Michael IX was already married.

In addition to Catherine of Courtenay, Andronikos II considered a number of other possibles brides for his eldest son: marriage proposals from Constantinople went to the Sicilian and Cypriot courts. At one time everyone thought that Michael IX would become the husband of Yolande of Aragon (sister of King Frederick III of Sicily), but this was also not destined to come true. In addition, Nikephoros I Komnenos Doukas, Despot of Epirus proposed his daughter Thamar as a bride for Michael IX, but the matter did not go beyond words.

Finally, Andronikos II sent an embassy to Levon II, King of Armenia; although the ambassadors were captured by pirates, the Emperor was not deterred, and very soon he sent a new embassy mission, led by Theodore Metochites and Patriarch John XII, to ask the hand of the Armenian princess Rita. The ambassadors returned with the young princess, and on their return to Constantinople, on 16 January 1294 at Hagia Sophia, the marriage between Michael IX and Rita (renamed Maria upon her wedding) took place. At that time, both groom and bride are 16-years-old. They had four children, two sons and two daughters:

- Andronikos III Palaiologos (25 March 1297 — 15 June 1341), who became Emperor after dethroning his grandfather in 1328.
- Manuel Palaiologos (died 1320). He was killed by soldiers of his older brother, who had allegedly mistaken him as a rival for the affections of a girl whom young Andronikos III was courting.
- Anna Palaiologina (died 1320), who married firstly in 1307 with Thomas I Komnenos Doukas, Despot of Epirus, and secondly in 1318 with Nicholas Orsini, Count Palatine of Cephalonia and Zakynthos and Despot of Epirus.
- Theodora Palaiologina (died aft. 1330), who married firstly in 1308 with Tsar Theodore Svetoslav of Bulgaria and secondly in 1324 with Tsar Michael Asen III of Bulgaria.

=== Relationship with stepmother ===
After the death of his first wife Anna of Hungary in 1281, Andronikos II entered into a new marriage in 1284, choosing as his wife the 10-year-old Yolanda of Montferrato, who was renamed Irene [Eirene] upon her wedding (as was customary for foreign princess with strange names in the Byzantine fashion); Michael IX and his brother Constantine were only a few years younger than their stepmother. As it turned out later, this girl became in an ambitious and intriguing woman. From her marriage with Andronikos II, Irene had seven children, of whom only survive four, three sons —John Palaiologos (born in 1286), Theodore Palaiologos (born in 1291) and Demetrios Palaiologos (born in 1297)— and a daughter —Simonis Palaiologina (born in 1294), later wife of King Stefan Uroš II Milutin of Serbia—, so she didn't like the prospect that her stepson Michael IX, to the detriment of the interests of her own children, would inherit the entire Empire after his father's death. Over time, Irene was possessed by a deep hatred against her stepson and an obsessive desire to bring her children to the throne:

The Empress...didn't cease, day and night alone, to bother him [that is, Andronikos II], so that he did one of two things: either deprived Emperor Michael of the royal power and divided it between her sons, or gave each of them a special part and allocated a special share of their power. When the Emperor said that it was impossible to violate the laws of the state bequeathed and approved by many centuries, the Empress was angry and annoyed her husband in different ways: she was yearning and said that she didn't want to live if she did not see the royal signs on her sons during her lifetime; then she pretended not to think about her children, and kept herself unapproachable, as if enticing her spouse to buy her charms at the cost of fulfilling her views relative to her sons. Since this happened often...the Emperor finally lost his patience...in conclusion, he hated her very bed...

After one of the quarrels with her husband, Irene, along with her sons, had to leave Constantinople and retire to Thessaloniki. The conflict between Irene and Michael IX ended only after the death of the Empress in 1317, who, however, before her death had time to disgrace herself and become famous for her unworthy behavior, like her attempts to "wash dirty linen in public" and tell everyone intimate and shameful details of her married life to everyone she met.

== Death ==
In October 1319, Michael IX was appointed by his father to govern Thessalonica, where, according to Nicephorus Gregoras, he had to try to put an end to the enmity between the Thessalians and the Pelasgians, which had lasted for many years. He humbly accepted his father's will and, together with his wife Rita-Maria, went to live in this city, despite the well-known prophecy at that time, according to which Michael IX was destined to die in Thessalonica, and which, as they say, worried him greatly.

Michael IX died on 12 October 1320 in the city of Thessalonica; reportedly, the cause of his death was because he couldn't stand the news of the successive deaths of his daughter Anna and son Manuel, who was mistakenly killed by soldiers of his older brother Andronikos III:

When the Despot Manuel died of the wound he had received, and the rumor of this reached Emperor Michael, who was living in Thessaloniki; then —what to say?— it struck his heart deeper than any arrow, so that, suppressed by obsessive thoughts of an unfortunate adventure, he underwent a terrible illness, which, after a little, brought him to the grave.

According to a Byzantine chronicler whose name has been lost to time, Michael IX was buried in the same place where he died — in Thessalonica.

== Michael and the Church ==
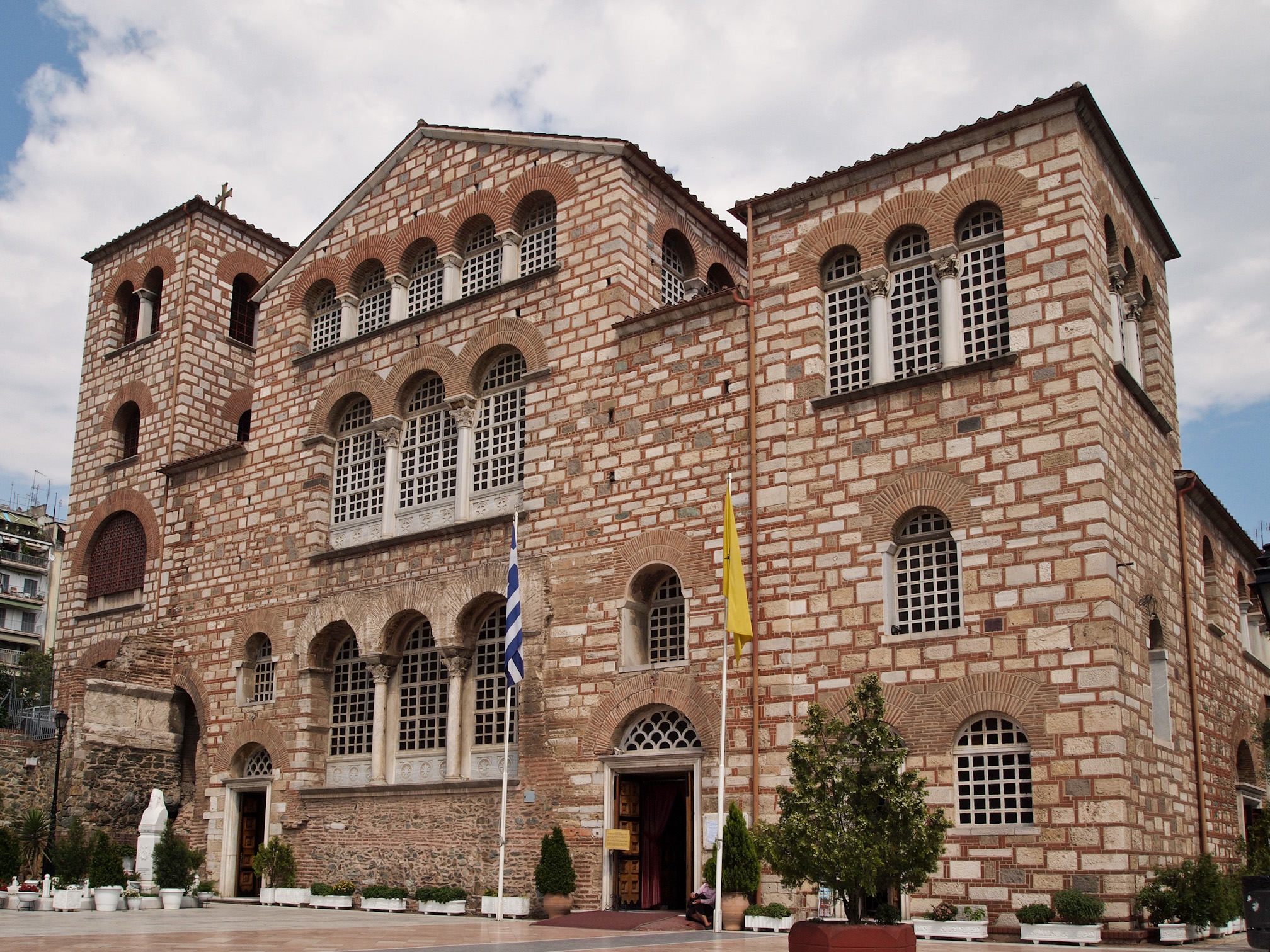
Hagios Demetrios at Thessalonica, destroyed in 1185 and rebuilt by Michael IX.

Michael IX was also known for his piety and devotion to the Church. In the last period of his life in Thessalonica, he ordered the restoration of the Hagios Demetrios (church dedicated to Saint Demetrius, the patron saint of Thessaloniki) after being almost completely destroyed by the Normans in 1185. In particular, under his leadership, the vaults were re-painted, the roof made and the temple columns renovated.

Over the years, he issued a large number of church decrees —known as chrysobull (Golden seal)—. Of greatest interest are his chrysobull of Iviron (1310) and Hilandar (March 1305) monasteries —by that time plundered by the Catalans after the memorable defeat at Apros— and the Brontochion Monastery (November 1318). According to these documents, the monks of these monasteries were exempted from many duties and taxes, including the delivery of food and drinks to the state. In the chrysobull of Iviron Monastery, Michael IX defined his role in the country and society as "Patron saint of subjects in the interests of the common good".

== Notes ==
Michael IX Palaiologos Palaiologos dynasty Born: 17 April 1277 Died: 12 October 1320[aged 43]
Preceded by Andronikos II Palaiologos	Byzantine Emperor; 1294–1320 with Andronikos II Palaiologos (1272–1328)	Succeeded by Andronikos II Palaiologos and Andronikos III Palaiologos
