= John XII of Constantinople =

Ecumenical Patriarch of Constantinople from 1294 to 1303

- Ecumenical Patriarch of Constantinople
- Church: Church of Constantinople
- In office: 1 January 1294 – 21 June 1303
- Predecessor: Athanasius I of Constantinople
- Successor: Athanasius I of Constantinople

Personal details
- Born: Sozopolis (now Sozopol, Bulgaria)
- Died: After 1308 Sozopolis (now Sozopol, Bulgaria)
- Denomination: Eastern Orthodoxy

John XII of Constantinople (Greek: Ἰωάννης; died after 1308) was the Ecumenical Patriarch of Constantinople from 1294 to 1303. John XII was born in Sozopolis on the western Black Sea coast (now Sozopol, Bulgaria). Prior to becoming patriarch, he was known as Kosmas.

== Notes and references ==
Eastern Orthodox Church titles
| Preceded by Athanasius I | Ecumenical Patriarch of Constantinople; 1294 – 1303 | Succeeded by Athanasius I (2) |
