= John Joseph Saunders =

British historian (1910–1972)

John Joseph Saunders (17 June 1910 – 25 November 1972) was a British historian whose work focused on medieval Islamic and Asian history.

Born in Alphington, Devon, he was educated at Exeter University. He was a lecturer at the University of Canterbury in New Zealand. Geoffrey Rice wrote of him:

John Saunders was an only child, and books were his best companions from an early age. He also displayed artistic ability with pen and ink drawing, having something of a gift for cartoons and caricature. At school at Mount Radford in Exeter he showed particular aptitude for languages, literature and history. One of the masters who noticed his potential, Theodore Vine, became a lifelong friend. John Saunders was too shy to make friends easily, but all his life he was a faithful correspondent, sustaining his friendships over long distances and periods of time. ... John Saunders died on 25 November 1972, shortly after his return to New Zealand. Saunders's reputation as an outstanding university teacher is well attested from many sources, and generations of Canterbury graduates remember him with affection and admiration.

His main works (sometimes signed J. J. Saunders) include:

- A History of Medieval Islam (1961)
- Aspects of the Crusades (1962)
- The Muslim World on the Eve of Europe's Expansion (1966)
- The History of the Mongol Conquests (1971)
- Muslims and Mongols: Essays on Medieval Asia (1977)
