= Terteroba =

Cuman-Kipchak tribe

The Terter or Terteroba (Bulgarian and Russian: Тертер-оба, Тертровичи) was a Cuman–Kipchak tribe or clan that took refuge in Hungary and then Bulgaria in the mid-13th century and may have produced the Terter dynasty that eventually ruled Bulgaria.

According to Pritsak, Terter is derived from a tributary of the Kura River in the Southern Caucasus. Peter Golden considers this a conjecture which, while possible, does not seem to be in keeping with most other Cuman-Kipchak names in which geographical referents are usually absent. The Qangli may be an exception. In the Russian annals, they were known as Ter'trobiči. In Arabic, they may have been called Durut. Golden etymologizes terter < teriter < terit- "to sweat".

It has been claimed that khan Köten (fl. 1223–39) belonged to the Terter. During the Mongol invasion, the surviving Cuman–Kipchak tribes sought refuge in the Kingdom of Hungary (1238). These adopted Christianity in return for protection. According to Hungarian sources, these tribes included the Chertan, Ulasoba, Burcoba (Burčeviči), Kolaba (Kolabiči) and Terteroba, the latter which was Köten's family.

According to Plamen Pavlov the Terter dynasty was a branch of the Terteroba who had settled in Bulgaria as part of the second wave of Cuman migration, coming from the Kingdom of Hungary after 1241.
