= Athanasius I of Constantinople =

Ecumenical Patriarch of Constantinople from 1289 to 1293 and from 1303 to 1309

Saint Athanasius I of Constantinople
- Ecumenical Patriarch of Constantinople
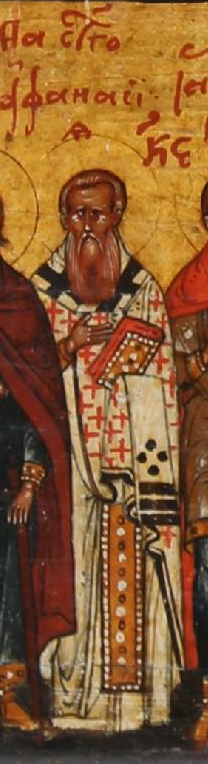
- Church: Church of Constantinople
- In office: 14 October 1289 – 16 October 1293; 23 June 1303 – September 1309
- Predecessor: Gregory II of Constantinople, John XII of Constantinople
- Successor: John XII of Constantinople, Nephon I of Constantinople

Personal details
- Born: c. 1230 Adrianople (modern-day Edirne, Turkey)
- Died: 28 October 1311 Constantinople
- Denomination: Eastern Orthodoxy

Athanasius I of Constantinople (Greek: Ἀθανάσιος; c. 1230 – 28 October 1311) was the Ecumenical Patriarch of Constantinople for two terms, from 1289 to 1293 and from 1303 to 1311. He was born in Adrianople and died in Constantinople.

He joined a monastery at Thessalonica and took the name Acacius; he went on to become a hermit at Mount Patra, before being ordained as a priest. He then spent ten years at Mount Galanteia.

Chosen by the emperor Andronikos II Palaiologos as patriarch, he opposed the reunion of the Greek and Roman Churches and introduced an ecclesiastic reform that evoked opposition within the clergy. He resigned in 1293 and was restored in 1303 with popular support. The pro-Union clerical faction forced him into retirement in September 1309.

He is commemorated as a saint in the Orthodox Church with his feast day observed annually on 28 October.

== Bibliography ==
- Afentoulidou-Leitgeb, Eirini; Die Hymnen des Theoktistos Studites auf Athanasios I von Konstantinopel, Einleitung, Edition, Kommentar (Wien, Verlag der Österreichischen Akademie der Wissenschaften, 2008) (Wiener Byzantinische Studien, 27).
- Boojamra, John L.; "Athanasios of Constantinople - A Study of Byzantine Reactions to Latin Religious Infiltration", Church History, 48 (1979), 27–48.
- Boojamra, John L.; Church Reform in the late Byzantine Empire - A study of the patriarchate of Athanasius of Constantinople, 1289–1293, 1303–1309 (Brookline, MA, Hellenic College Press, 1980).
- Boojamra, John L.; The Church and Social Reform - The policies of the Patriarch Athanasios of Constantinople, (New York, Fordham University Press, 1993). ISBN 9780823213351
- Mitsiou, Ekaterini; "Das Doppelkloster des Patriarchen Athanasios I - in Konstantinopel - Historisch-prosopographische und wirtschaftliche Beobachtungen", Jahrbuch der Österreichischen Byzantinistik, 58 (2008).
- Pavlikianov, Cyril (2001). The Medieval Aristocracy on Mount Athos - Philological and Documentary Evidence for the Activity of Byzantine, Georgian and Slav Aristocrats and Eminent Churchmen in the Monasteries of Mount Athos from the 10th to the 15th Century. Sofia: Center for Slavo-Byzantine Studies.
- Alice-Mary Talbot, "The Patriarch Athanasius (1289–1293; 1303–1309) and the Church", Dumbarton Oaks Papers, 27 (1973), 11–28.
- Alice-Mary Talbot (ed., tr. and comm.), The Correspondence of Athanasius I, Patriarch of Constantinople - Letters to the Emperor Andronicus II, members of the imperial family, and officials (Washington, Dumbarton Oaks Center for Byzantine Studies, 1975).
- Alice-Mary Talbot, Faith healing in late Byzantium - The posthumous miracles of the Patriarch Athanasios I of Constantinople by Theoktistos the Stoudite, (Brookline, MA, Hellenic College Press, 1983) (Archbishop Iakovos library of ecclesiastical and historical sources, 8).

Eastern Orthodox Church titles
Preceded by Gregory II	Ecumenical Patriarch of Constantinople; 1289 – 1293	Succeeded by John XII
Preceded by John XII	Ecumenical Patriarch of Constantinople; 1303 – 1309	Succeeded by Nephon I
