= George II of Bulgaria =

Tsar of Bulgaria from 1322 to 1323

George Terter II
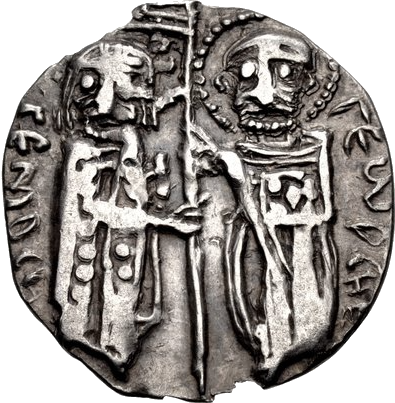
- Coin of George Terter II

Tsar of Bulgaria
- Reign: 1322–1323
- Predecessor: Theodore Svetoslav
- Successor: Michael Shishman
- Died: 1323
- House: Terter
- Father: Theodore Svetoslav
- Mother: Euphrosyne

Georgi Terter II (Bulgarian: Георги Тертер II; died 1323) reigned as tsar of Bulgaria between 1322 and 1323. The exact date of his birth is unknown, but he was born not long before 1307.

== Life ==
George Terter II was the son of Theodore Svetoslav and Euphrosyne, and was named after his paternal grandfather George Terter I. It is possible that he was associated as co-emperor by his father in 1321, but the sources are unclear. After his father's death in 1322, he became actively involved in the civil war in the Byzantine Empire, in which the throne was being contested between Andronikos II Palaiologos and his grandson Andronikos III Palaiologos. Taking advantage of the situation, George Terter II invaded Byzantine Thrace and, encountering little, if any, resistance, conquered the major city of Philippopolis (Plovdiv) and part of the surrounding area in 1322. A Bulgarian garrison was installed under the command of a general named Ivan the Russian, and a court scribe praised George Terter II as a "possessor of the Bulgarian and the Greek sceptre". A new campaign later the same year brought the subjugation of several fortresses around Adrianople, but the Bulgarians were now turned back and defeated by Andronikos III. The Byzantine emperor was preparing for an invasion of Bulgaria, when he heard the news that George Terter II had died, apparently of natural causes.

George Terter II died as a young man and did not have any known offspring. He was succeeded by his distant cousin Michael Asen III, now commonly called Michael Shishman.

Preceded by Theodore Svetoslav	Tsar of Bulgaria; 1322–1323	Succeeded by Michael Shishman
