= Theodore Svetoslav of Bulgaria =

Tsar of Bulgaria from 1300 to 1322

Theodore Svetoslav
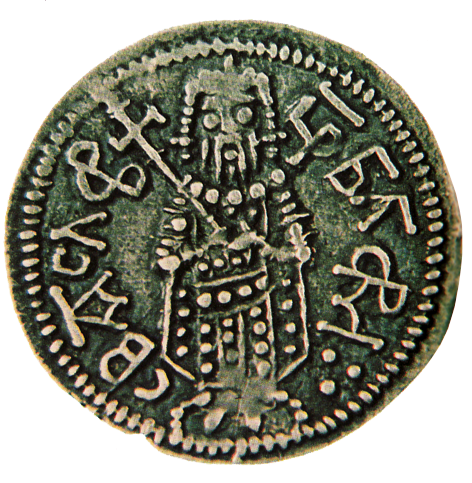

Tsar of Bulgaria
- Reign: 1300–1322
- Predecessor: Chaka
- Successor: George Terter II
- Died: 1322
- Spouse: Euphrosyne; Theodora Palaiologina
- Issue: George Terter II
- House: Terter
- Father: George Terter I
- Mother: Maria Terter
- Religion: Christianity

Theodore Svetoslav (Bulgarian: Тодор Светослав, Todor Svetoslav and also Теодор Светослав, Teodor Svetoslav) ruled as emperor (tsar) of Bulgaria from 1300 to 1322. The date of his birth is unknown. He captured northeast fortresses and expanded the territory of the Bulgarian Empire.

Apart from his external and economic successes, Theodore Svetoslav dealt with the separatists among the nobility including his uncle. He persecuted the traitors who he thought were responsible for the Mongol interference and even the Patriarch, Joachim III, was executed.

== Early life ==
Theodore Svetoslav was the son of George Terter I by his first wife, Maria. Given the rarity of the name Svetoslav in Bulgaria and its ample use among the Rjurikid princes, Plamen Pavlov has proposed that Maria was the daughter of Jakov Svetoslav by his wife, an unnamed granddaughter of Ivan Asen II. Soon after the accession of Ivan Asen III in 1279, his father divorced his mother in order to marry the sister of the new emperor. Maria and Theodore Svetoslav were sent to the Byzantine Empire as hostages and settled in Nicaea.

The accession of George Terter I to the throne in 1280 did not alter matters, but, in 1281, Theodore Svetoslav was betrothed (in absentia) to a daughter of the sebastokratōr John I Doukas of Thessaly, as part of a diplomatic alliance. The young bride-to-be arrived in Tărnovo but never met her intended husband.

In 1284, George Terter I concluded a new treaty with Andronikos II Palaiologos, and retrieved his first wife, while Theodore Svetoslav at first remained a hostage. The same treaty required the breaking off of the alliance with Thessaly and Theodore Svetoslav's intended bride was also sent to Byzantium. It was only in 1285 that the Patriarch of Bulgaria Joakim III arrived in Constantinople and arranged for the release of Theodore Svetoslav, who was now supposed to marry a daughter of the high court official John Synadenos. It is unknown if this marriage ever materialized.

== Political activities ==
In Bulgaria, Theodore Svetoslav was associated as co-emperor by his father, who issued coins representing them side by side. He was later sent to the Golden Horde. Theodore Svetoslav's unnamed sister married Nogai's son Chaka. During part of his exile, Theodore Svetoslav became impoverished and sought to improve his fortunes by marrying the rich Euphrosyne, the god-daughter of Nogai's wife Euphrosyne Palaiologina, who was herself an illegitimate daughter of Emperor Michael VIII Palaiologos.

Theodore Svetoslav left obscurity in 1298 or 1299 when he accompanied his brother-in-law Chaka in an invasion of Bulgaria. The regency for Ivan II fled Tărnovo in 1299, and Theodore Svetoslav helped convince the Bulgarian nobility to accept Chaka as ruler. However, the armies of the khan of the Golden Horde Toqta entered Bulgaria in pursuit of his enemy Chaka, and Theodore Svetoslav promptly organized a plot, deposing Chaka and having him strangled in prison in 1300. Theodore Svetoslav now became emperor of Bulgaria and sent Chaka's severed head as a present to Toqta, who withdrew his armies from the country.

A more recent interpretation of these events portrays Theodore Svetoslav as ascending to the Bulgarian throne in 1299 with Chaka being his de facto suzerain and not ruler or co-ruler of Bulgaria. Such a relationship would have been more acceptable for the Bulgarian nobility to agree to, as it had existed between previous Bulgarian emperors and Chaka's father Nogai. Moreover, Chaka's political ambitions lied within the Golden Horde and not Bulgaria, which is what prompted Toqta to invade and ultimately led to Chaka's death at the orders of Emperor Theodore Svetoslav.

== Emperor of Bulgaria ==
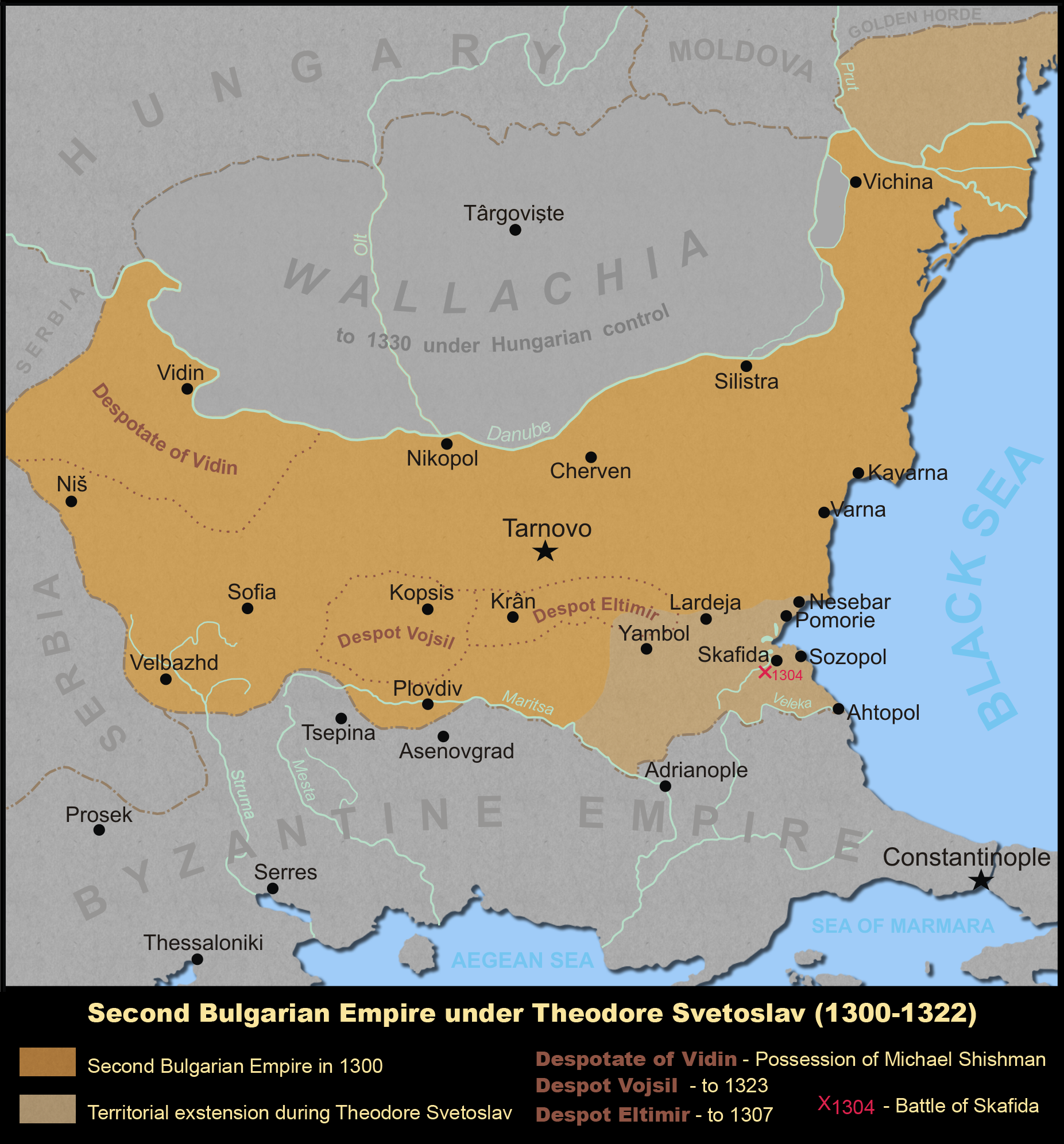
Second Bulgarian Empire under Theodore Svetoslav

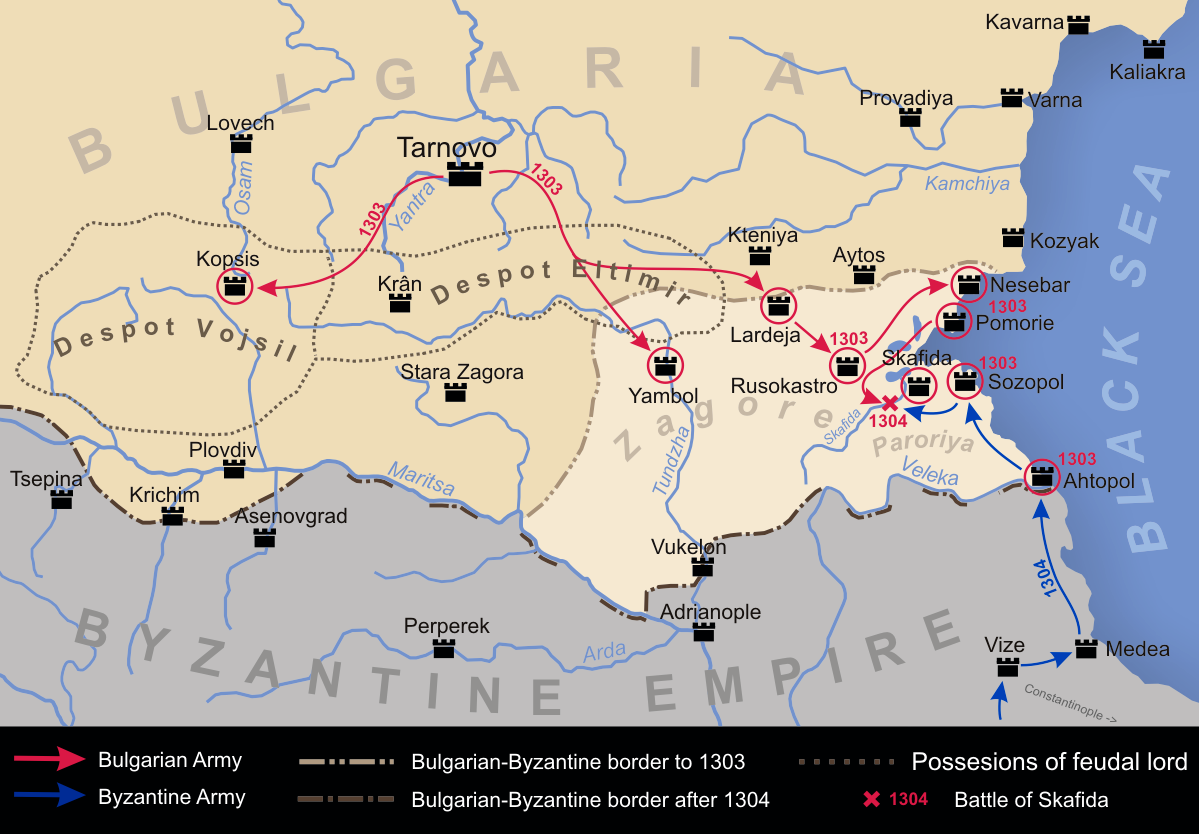
Military campaign of Theodore Svetoslav (1303-1304)

The reign of Theodore Svetoslav is connected with the internal stabilization and pacification of the country, the end of Mongol control of Tarnovo, and the recovery of portions of Thrace lost to the Byzantine Empire since the wars against Ivaylo of Bulgaria.

Theodore Svetoslav pursued a ruthless course of action, punishing all who stood in his way, including his former benefactor, Patriarch Joachim III, who was accused of treason and executed. In the face of the new emperor's brutality, some noble factions sought to replace him with other claimants to the throne, backed by Andronikos II. A new claimant appeared in the person of the sebastokratōr Radoslav Voïsil or Vojsil, from Sredna Gora, a brother of the former emperor Smilets, who was defeated, and captured by Theodore Svetoslav's uncle, the despotēs Aldimir (Eltimir), at Krăn in about 1301. Another pretender was the former emperor Michael Asen II, who unsuccessfully tried to advance into Bulgaria with a Byzantine army in about 1302. Theodore Svetoslav exchanged thirteen high-ranking Byzantine officers captured on Radoslav's defeat for his father George Terter I, whom he settled in a life of luxury in an unidentified city.

=== Expansion ===
As a consequence of his victories, Theodore Svetoslav felt secure enough to move on to the offensive by 1303 and captured the fortresses of northeastern Thrace, including Mesembria (Nesebăr), Anchialos (Pomorie), Sozopolis (Sozopol), and Agathopolis (Ahtopol) in 1304. The Byzantine counterattack failed at the battle of Skafida near Poros (Burgas), where the Co-emperor Michael IX Palaiologos was turned to flight. Nevertheless, the war continued, with Michael IX and Theodore Svetoslav taking turns pillaging each other's lands. In the following 1305 Theodore Svetoslav's uncle Aldimir appears to have entered into negotiations with the Byzantines, and Theodore Svetoslav annexed his uncle's lands. In 1306 Theodore Svetoslav gained the services of the rebellious Alan mercenaries to the Byzantines, whom he settled in Bulgaria, and made unsuccessful overtures to the mercenaries of the Catalan Company, who had also rebelled against their Byzantine employers. The war ended with a peace treaty in 1307, cemented with a marriage between the widowed Theodore Svetoslav and Theodora, a daughter of the Co-emperor Michael IX Palaiologos.

A copper coin of Theodore Svetoslav.

Until the end of his life, Theodore Svetoslav remained at peace with his neighbors. His reassertion of central control over outlying provinces such as Vidin was probably peaceful, and the sparsely documented recovery of the banate of Severin from the Kingdom of Hungary must have been achieved during the dynastic struggles in that country. In 1318 the Serbian King Stefan Uroš II Milutin visited Tărnovo, in spite of his earlier alliance with Andronikos II and his divorce from Theodore Svetoslav's sister Anna.

The only possible sign of new hostilities are two Mongol raids into Byzantine Thrace in 1320 and 1321, but these were probably executed with Bulgarian cooperation and are connected with the beginning of the civil war between Andronikos II Palaiologos and his grandson Andronikos III Palaiologos. In fact, Theodore Svetoslav sent military support to his brother-in-law Andronikos III, allegedly hoping to ensnare and capture his ally.

After a surprisingly successful reign (given the misadventures of his youth), Theodore Svetoslav died in early 1322 and was succeeded by his son George Terter II.

== Family ==
By his first wife Euphrosyne (Efrosina), Theodore Svetoslav had one son, George Terter II, who succeeded as emperor of Bulgaria from 1322 to 1323. It is not known if he had children by his second wife Theodora Palaiologina, daughter of Emperor Michael IX Palaiologos.

== Legacy ==
Terter Peak on Greenwich Island in the South Shetland Islands, Antarctica is named for Tsar Theodore Svetoslav of Bulgaria.

Theodore Svetoslav's seal is depicted on the reverse of the Bulgarian 2 levs banknote, issued in 1999 and 2005.

== Sources ==
- John V.A. Fine, Jr., The Late Medieval Balkans, A Critical Survey from the Late Twelfth Century to the Ottoman Conquest, Ann Arbor (1987)

Preceded by Chaka	Tsar of Bulgaria; 1300–1322	Succeeded by George Terter II
