= Marina Smilets of Bulgaria =

Marina Smilets
- Despotissa of Kran
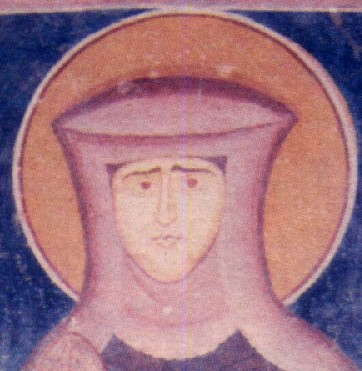
- Born: before 1292; Bulgaria
- Died: 7 April 1355; Serbian Empire
- Burial: Skopje
- Spouse: Aldimir
- Issue: Ivan Dragushin
- House: Smilets dynasty Palaiologos; Terter dynasty
- Father: Smilets of Bulgaria
- Mother: Smiltsena Palaiologina

Marina Smilets (Bulgarian: Марина Смилец, before 1292 – 7 April 1355) was the eldest daughter of tsar Smilets of Bulgaria and his Byzantine wife, tentatively called Smiltsena Palaiologina.

== Family ==
The date and the place of Marina's birth are unknown, but she was born before her father's ascension on the Bulgarian throne in 1292, maybe in his official residence in Kran. Marina's mother was the daughter of Constantine Palaiologos (half-brother of Michael VIII). In the histories she was called Smiltsena (Bulgarian: Смилцена; the wife of Smilets), without a name being given. Marina was the elder sister of tsar Ivan II of Bulgaria and Teodora, queen-consort of Serbia. Marina was maternal aunt of Emperor Stefan Dušan.

== Despotissa of Kran ==
Tsar Smilets died in 1298 and Ivan II of Bulgaria succeeded him as emperor in Tarnovo. The new tsar was a child, and the government was in the hands of the widowed empress Smiltsena. Marina's mother apparently defeated Smilets' brothers Radoslav and Voysil, who sought refuge in the Byzantine Empire and entered into Byzantine service. To meet this threat and the invasion of the Mongol prince Chaka, Smiltsena sought an alliance with Aldimir (Eltimir), the brother of the former ruler George Terter I. Aldimir was accordingly married to Marina and, if this had not happened earlier, was given the title of despotēs and invested with an extensive landholding around Kran. As his wife, Marina was granted the title of despotissa of Kran.

Despina Marina gave birth to a son, called Ivan Dragushin.

The regents of Ivan II were unable to strengthen their position, and abandoned Tarnovo to Chaka, who installed himself as emperor in 1299. Smiltsena and Ivan II settled in the possessions of Aldimir and Marina, where they may have remained until the accession of Aldimir's nephew Theodore Svetoslav to the throne in 1300. Aldimir entered into an alliance with Theodore Svetoslav and his own possessions around Kran were enlarged. As result Aldemir maybe asked Marina's family to leave Kran and they fled to Constantinople.

== Exile ==
In 1305 Aldemir appears to have entered into negotiations with the Byzantines, and Theodore annexed his uncle's lands. Marina may have had a strong influence over the policy of her husband and, after Aldimir's subjugation by the Tsar, she and Ivan Dragushin fled to Constantinople.

After 1321, Marina and her son relocated to the Kingdom of Serbia, where the power was seized by King Stefan Dečanski, who was married to Marina's sister Theodora. Marina was treated with high respect by Dečanski and his son, Stefan Dušan, who was her nephew. In Serbia, Marina and her son were land in Polog. Later she retired to a monastery under the monastic name Maria.

Marina was portrayed along with a boy, а grandson of her, in the church of Kavadarci in Pološko Monastery.

Marina Smilets survived her son and died on 7 April 1355. She was buried in Skopie.

== Sources ==
- Pavlov, Plamen, "Търновските царици". ДАР-РХ, 2006.
