= Ivan Dragushin =

Bulgarian lord

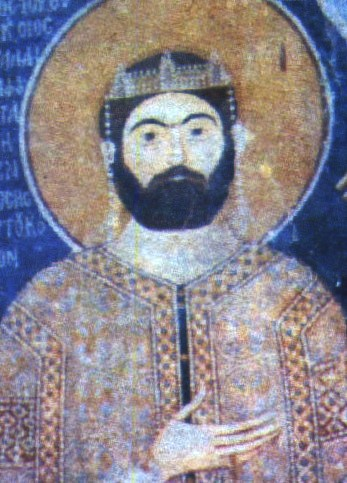
- Spouse: Anna
- Issue: a son
- Father: Aldimir
- Mother: Marina Smilets of Bulgaria

Ivan Dragushin (Bulgarian: Иван Драгушин) was a Bulgarian nobleman, son of despot Aldimir from the Terter dynasty of the Second Bulgarian Empire.

Ivanʻs mother was Marina Smilets, the daughter of tsar Smilets of Bulgaria, whilst Ivan's father was Aldimir, a younger brother of Tsar George I Terter. Aldimir was an influential local ruler as the despot of Kran. Marinaʻs sister was Teodora of Bulgaria, Queen of Serbia, the first wife of Stefan Uroš III Dečanski.

Aldimir may have been murdered around 1305, as no activity of his is mentioned in later sources. His widow Marina and his son Ivan Dragushin managed to escape to Kingdom of Serbia, where Marina's sister, Theodora, was married to the prince Stefan Dečanski. Having become a Serbian subject, Ivan Dragushin was installed by his first cousin King Stephen Dušan as a local ruler in the region of Macedonia. Donor's portraits of Marina and Ivan Dragushin exist in the Pološko Monastery near Kavadarci, where Ivan Dragushin was buried before 1340. It is known Ivan and his wife Anna had a son, who is depicted with Marina in the church.
