= Terter dynasty =

Bulgarian aristocratic dynasty of Cuman origin

Terter Тертеровци
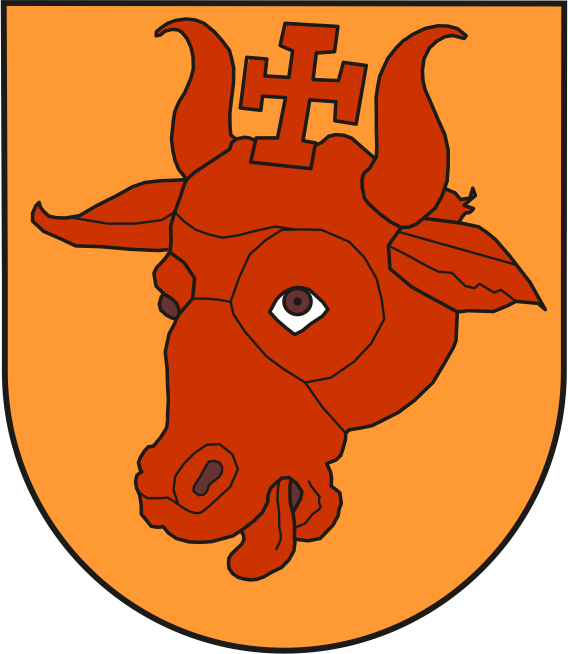
- Parent house: Terteroba
- Founded: 1280
- Founder: Prince Aldimir
- Current head: Extinct
- Titles: Knyaz, Tsar
- Dissolution: 1323

The House of Terter (Bulgarian: Тертер), also Terterids or Terterovtsi (Тертеровци), was a Bulgarian noble and royal house of Cuman origin, a branch of the Cuman noble dynasty of Terteroba, that ruled the Second Bulgarian Empire between 1280 and 1292, as well as between 1300 and 1323.

== History ==
Family tree of the Terter dynasty.

=== Origin ===
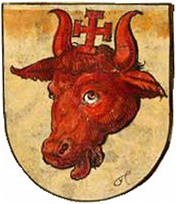
The Terter coat of arms as it appears in a 16th century codex

The Terterids were originally of Cuman origin (from the Cuman-Kipchak confederation), according to Plamen Pavlov they were a branch of the Cuman noble dynasty of Terteroba who had settled in Bulgaria as part of the second wave of Cuman migration, coming from the Kingdom of Hungary after 1241. The Terteroba had ruled the Cuman-Kipchak confederation in the late 11th century, as well as in the mid-13th century under Khan Köten.

=== Monarchy ===
The earliest representatives of the dynasty in Bulgaria were the despotēs Aldimir (Eltimir) and his older brother George Terter who was crowned emperor of Bulgaria as George I of Bulgaria (1280-1292), marrying the Bulgarian Maria. After his reign, Bulgaria was under the de facto control of the Golden Horde, with Nogai Khan nominating the next ruler, Smilets (1292-1298), who was of another noble family, and was briefly succeeded by his son Ivan II (1298-1299). In 1299–1300, Bulgaria was controlled by the Mongol Chaka. Chaka was deposed by George Terter's son, Theodore Svetoslav of Bulgaria (1300-1321), beginning the second reign of the Terterids, which also spanned that of his son, George II of Bulgaria.

The Terter dynasty was succeeded by the Shishman noble dynasty of Vidin, also of partial Cuman origin.

== Members ==
- Aldimir (Eltimir)
  - Ivan Dragushin
- George I of Bulgaria (ruled 1280-1292)
  - Theodore Svetoslav of Bulgaria (ruled 1300-1321)
    - George II of Bulgaria
  - Anna, wife of Stefan Uroš II Milutin of Serbia
  - Elena, wife of Chaka
