= Joachim III =

Joachim III may refer to:

- Joachim III Frederick, Elector of Brandenburg (1546–1608)
- Patriarch Joachim III of Constantinople (1834–1912)
- Joachim III of Bulgaria, Patriarch of Bulgarian Orthodox Church 1282 - 1300
