= Patriarch Joachim III =

Patriarch Joachim III may refer to:

- Joachim III of Bulgaria, Patriarch of Bulgaria c. 1282–1300
- Joachim III of Constantinople, Ecumenical Patriarch of Constantinople in 1878–1884 and 1901–1912
