= Aldimir =

Bulgarian despot and local lord

- Despot of Kran
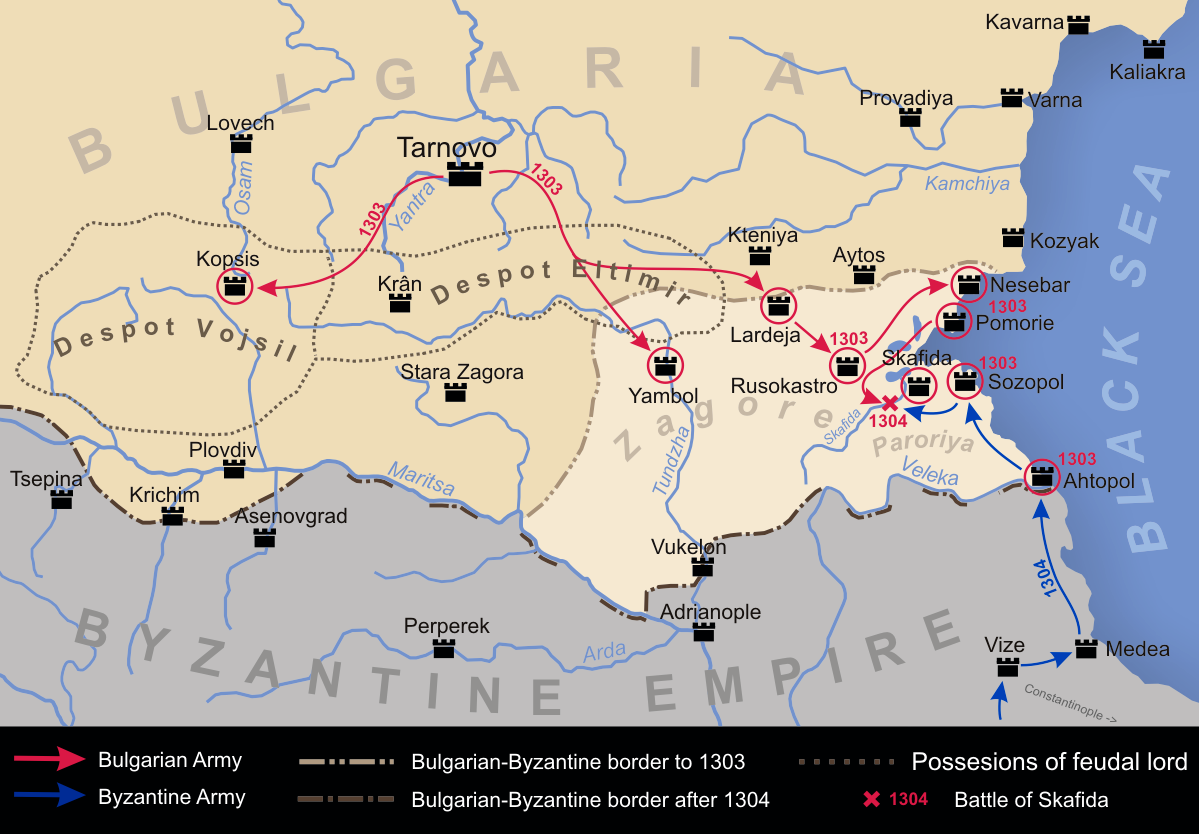
- Map of Theodore Svetoslav's military campaigns also showing Aldimir's lands
- Died: 1305 or later
- Noble family: Terter dynasty
- Spouse: Marina Smilets of Bulgaria
- Issue: Ivan Dragushin

Aldimir (Bulgarian: Алдимир) or Eltimir (Note: While Aldimir is mentioned in Medieval Greek sources solely as Ἐλτιμηρῆς, Eltimiris, his original name Aldimir has been established thanks to the discovery of his son Ivan Dragushin's epitaph.) (Елтимир) (fl. 1280–1305) was a Bulgarian noble of the 13th–14th century. A member of the Terter dynasty and a younger brother of Tsar George I Terter, Aldimir was an influential local ruler as the despot of Kran. Aldimir rose to that position under his brother George, though as Smilets assumed the throne he was forced into exile. At the turn of the 14th century, Aldimir returned to Bulgaria as an ally of the regent widowed consort Smiltsena. He did not oppose the accession of his nephew Theodore Svetoslav and even assisted him in ousting his contenders. However, he was promptly eliminated by Theodore Svetoslav when he betrayed him to ally with the Byzantines.

== Under George I and Smiltsena ==
Just like his brother George, Aldimir was of Cuman origin. Bulgarian historian Plamen Pavlov is of the opinion that Aldimir and George's ancestors had sought refuge in Bulgaria after 1241, when they left the Kingdom of Hungary amidst sedition. The brothers must have originated from the Cuman royal dynasty Terteroba, and the ruler Köten was probably their relative or even direct ancestor. Pavlov also interprets Aldimir's name as originating from the Cuman-language expression for "heated iron".

Aldimir rose in importance with the accession of his older brother George (r. 1280–1292) to the Bulgarian throne in 1280. He must have been conferred the high noble title of despot during George's reign, and American historian John Fine believes Aldimir was granted his appanage at that time. Pavlov, however, conjectures that Aldimir's domain dates to 1298, long after George's reign.

Unlike the neighbouring principality of Smilets at Kopsis, Aldimir remained loyal to the Bulgarian government and ensured that his domain retained its ties to the capital Tarnovo. Fine describes Aldimir's lands as spanning the region from modern Sliven in the east to Kazanlak or Karlovo in the west, just south of the Balkan Mountains. His capital was the fortress of Kran in the Rose Valley.

After George's abdication in 1292, Aldimir had to flee into exile. He may have followed his brother as a refugee in the Byzantine Empire, though he certainly settled in the Golden Horde not long thereafter. Perhaps with Tatar approval, Aldimir returned to Bulgaria in 1298, after the reign of Smilets (r. 1292–1298) was over and the empire was in the hands of the child Tsar Ivan II and his mother, the widow of Smilets tentatively known as Smiltsena. Aldimir pledged his loyalty to Smiltsena, who either granted him the domain south of the Balkan Mountains or restored him to his former appanage. To consolidate that union, Aldimir married Smiltsena's daughter, the princess Marina, possibly in late 1298.

With Aldimir's appointment as despot of Kran, Smiltsena ensured that his lands were better protected from Smilets' brothers Radoslav and Voysil who, as émigrés in Byzantium, held aspirations for the Bulgarian throne or at least their former domains. During Smiltsena's regency, Aldimir was one of the most influential people in Bulgaria; indeed, Byzantine statesman Theodore Metochites refers to the "Scythian [i.e. Cuman] venturer", as he calls Aldimir, as the queen's right-hand man. Aldimir's leading position leaves little doubt that he was involved in the fruitless anti-Byzantine negotiations between Bulgaria and Serbia in 1299. Pavlov even goes as far as to suggest that the proposed anti-Byzantine union was the brainchild of Aldimir.

== Under Theodore Svetoslav ==
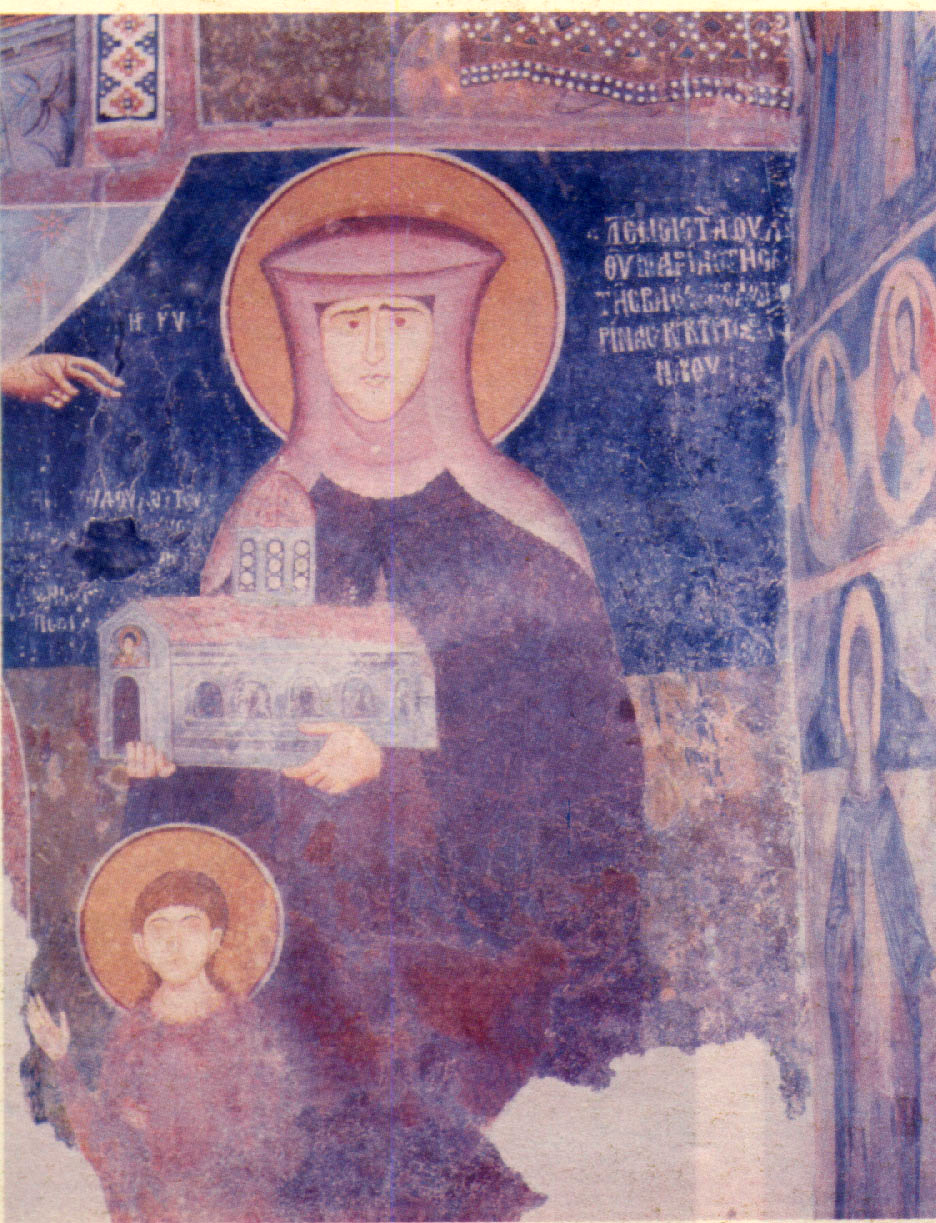
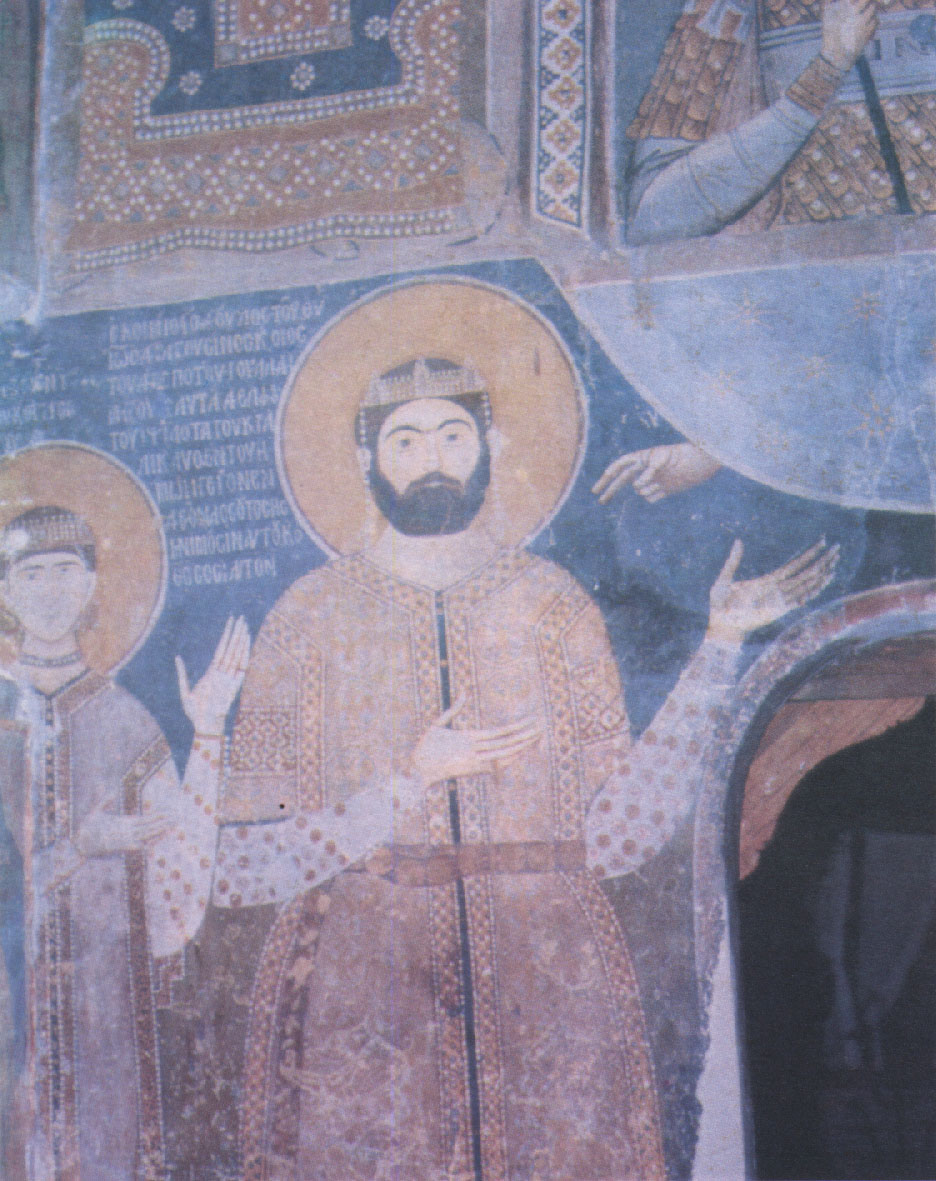
Portraits of Aldimir's wife Marina Smilets of Bulgaria (left) and son Ivan Dragushin (right) from the Pološko Monastery

In 1299, George's son and Aldimir's nephew Theodore Svetoslav (r. 1300–1322), the legitimate successor to the Bulgarian throne, invaded Bulgaria along with Tatar troops. The news of that invasion was enough to force Smiltsena and Ivan to flee to the despotate of Kran even before Theodore Svetoslav's troops had reached the capital. Aldimir gave refuge to Smiltsena and Ivan, though he was clearly not opposed to his newly crowned nephew. In 1300, Smilets' brother sebastokrator Radoslav headed a Byzantine-supported campaign against Aldimir en route to the capital. However, the attack had disastrous consequences to Radoslav. He was captured by Aldimir, blinded and forced back to Thessaloniki, while his Byzantine generals were sent as captives to Theodore Svetoslav. With this act, Aldimir pledged his allegiance to Theodore Svetoslav, who rewarded him with an extension to his appanage. The despotate of Kran was enlarged to the east to include the fortresses of Yambol and Lardea near today's Karnobat.

While Aldimir was nominally loyal to Theodore Svetoslav, the presence of Smiltsena and Ivan at his court would have been seen by the Bulgarian emperor as a threat. In addition, Aldimir perhaps harboured a desire to accede to the throne himself. After Theodore Svetoslav's victory over Byzantium at Skafida in 1304, the Byzantines approached Aldimir with a proposal for an anti-Bulgarian alliance. Aldimir initially remained adamant and was hostile to the Byzantine forces which entered his domain in 1305. However, by the end of that year Aldimir had switched sides to the Byzantines, as Theodore Svetoslav took back the fortresses that he had granted to Aldimir. Shortly thereafter, Theodore Svetoslav restored his direct power over Kran by reconquering and annexing the appanage.

Aldimir may have been murdered during this campaign, as no activity of his is mentioned in later sources. His widow Marina and his son Ivan Dragushin managed to escape to Serbia, where Marina's sister, Theodora, was married to the prince Stephen Dečanski. Having become a Serbian subject, Ivan Dragushin was installed by his first cousin King Stephen Dušan as a local ruler in the region of Macedonia. Donor's portraits of Marina and Ivan Dragushin exist in the Pološko Monastery near Kavadarci, where Ivan Dragushin was buried before 1340.

== Sources ==
- Fine, John Van Antwerp (1994). The Late Medieval Balkans: A Critical Survey from the Late Twelfth Century to the Ottoman Conquest. University of Michigan Press. pp. 175–184. ISBN 978-0-472-08260-5.
- Андреев, Йордан; Лазаров, Иван; Павлов, Пламен (1999). Кой кой е в средновековна България [Who is Who in Medieval Bulgaria] (in Bulgarian). Петър Берон. ISBN 978-954-402-047-7.
- Андреев, Йордан; Пантев, Андрей (2004). Българските ханове и царе [Bulgarian Khans and Tsars] (in Bulgarian). Велико Търново: Абагар. ISBN 978-954-427-216-6.
- Павлов, Пламен (2005). ""Авантюристът-скит" Алдимир и Теодор Светослав" [The "Scythian Venturer" Aldimir and Theodore Svetoslav]. Бунтари и авантюристи в средновековна България [Rebels and Venturers in Medieval Bulgaria] (in Bulgarian). Варна: LiterNet. ISBN 954-304-152-0.
