= Dunavtsi (disambiguation) =

Dunavtsi or Dounavtsi (in Bulgarian: Дунавци) may refer to:

- Dunavtsi - a city in Vidin Municipality, Vidin Province, Bulgaria
- Dunavtsi, Stara Zagora Province - a village in Kazanlak Municipality, Stara Zagora Province, Bulgaria
- Dunavtsi, Veliko Tarnovo Province - a village in Veliko Tarnovo Municipality, Veliko Tarnovo Province, Bulgaria
