= Smilets dynasty =

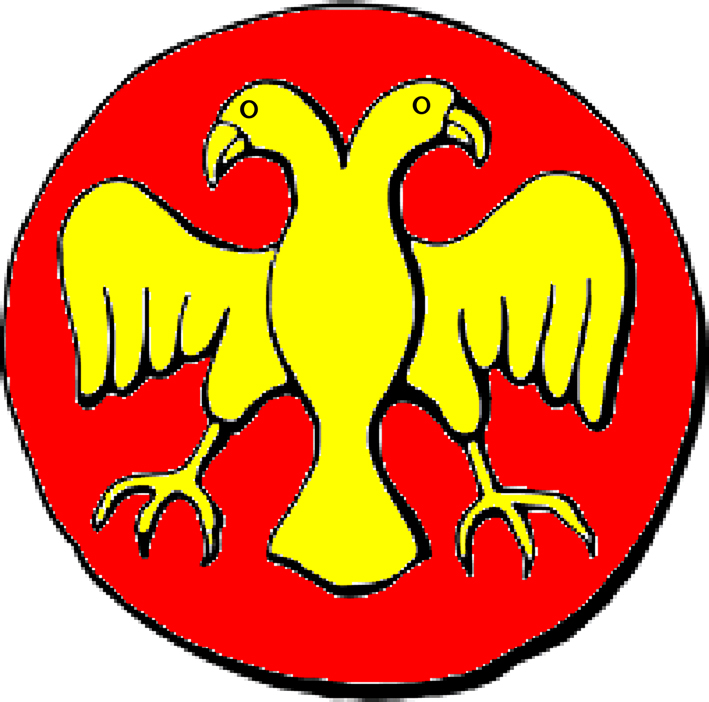
Coat of arms of the House of Smilets, ruling family of the Second Bulgarian Empire

The House of Smilets (Bulgarian: Смилец) was an imperial house of the Second Bulgarian Empire. Founded by Tsar Smilets of Bulgaria in 1292, the dynasty was short-lived, ending under Smilets' son Ivan II of Bulgaria in 1299.

== Notable members ==
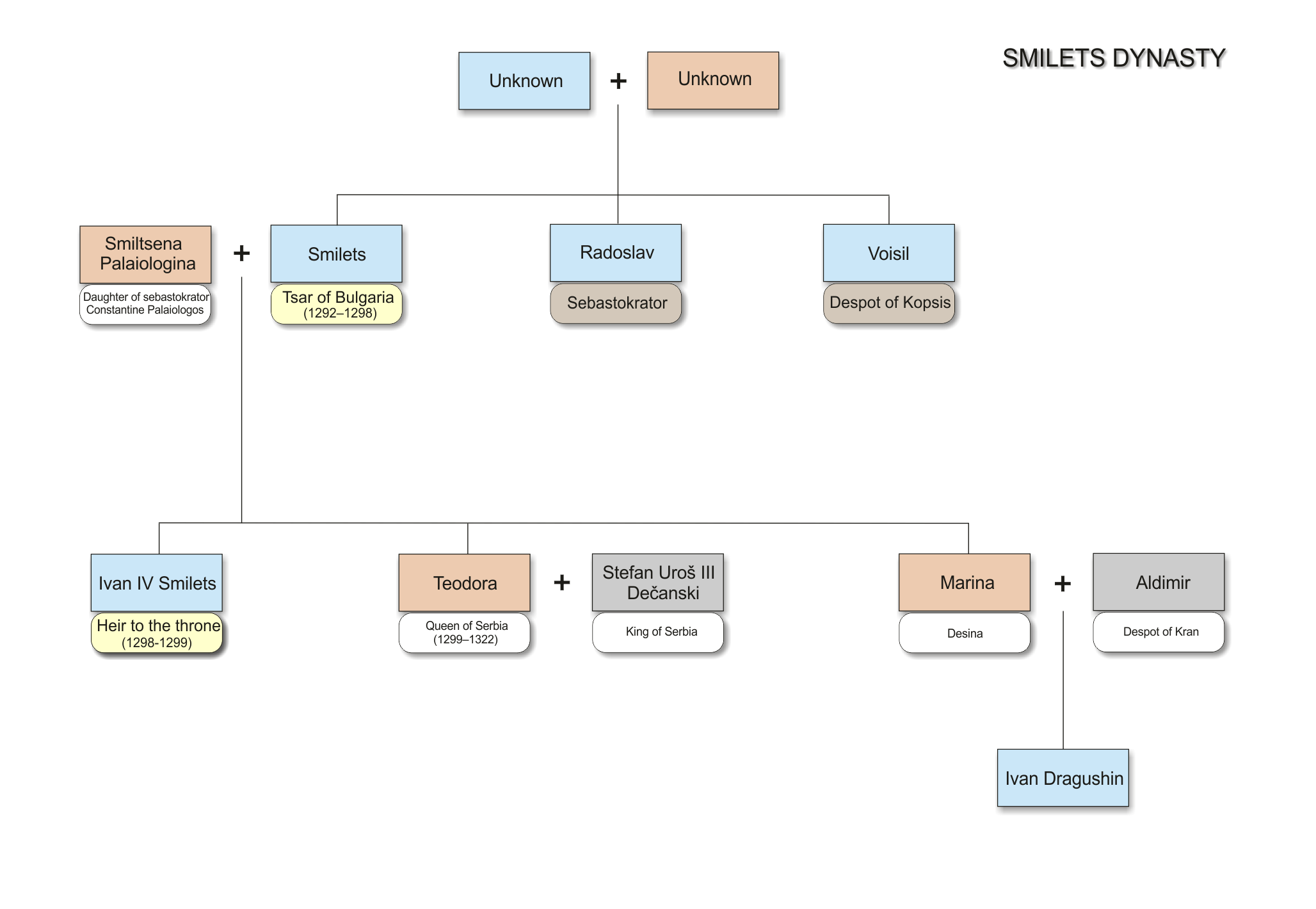
Genealogical tree of the Smilets dynasty of Bulgaria

- Smilets of Bulgaria – his parentage is unknown, but he was of noble birth and had two brothers
- Smiltsena Palaiologina – niece of Byzantine Emperor Michael VIII Palaiologos and wife of Smilets
- Marina Smilets of Bulgaria – daughter of Smilets and his wife, Smiltsena
- Teodora of Bulgaria, Queen of Serbia – daughter of Smilets and his wife, Smiltsena
- Ivan II of Bulgaria – the son of Smilets and Smiltsena, who later reigned as Tsar Ivan II of Bulgaria. With his death, the former ruling House of Smilets became exintct.
