= Smiltsena Palaiologina =

Smiltsena

Empress consort of Bulgaria
- Spouse: Smilets of Bulgaria
- Issue: Marina Smilets of Bulgaria; Teodora of Bulgaria, Queen of Serbia; Ivan II of Bulgaria
- Father: Constantine Palaiologos
- Mother: Irene Komnene Laskarina Branaina

Smiltsena (Bulgarian: Смилцена) was the niece of Byzantine Emperor Michael VIII Palaiologos, and empress-consort (tsaritsa) of Tsar Smilets of Bulgaria.

== Empress consort of Bulgaria ==
Smiltsena was the daughter of sebastocrator Constantine Palaiologos, who was a half-brother of Emperor Michael VIII Palaiologos, and his wife Irene Komnene Laskarina Branaina. In the histories she was called just Smiltsena (Bulgarian: жената на Смилец, lit. 'the wife of Smilets'), without a name being given.

Smilets ascended the throne of Bulgaria in 1292 and the new tsaritsa moved from her husband's provincial residence into the royal palace in Tarnovo.

== Regent of Bulgaria ==
Her husband died in 1298 and was succeeded by their son Ivan II and Smiltsena took over the government as tsarina-regent because Ivan was still a child at the time. The widowed empress apparently defeated Smilets' brothers Radoslav and Voysil (Vojsil), who sought refuge in the Byzantine Empire and entered into Byzantine service. To meet this threat and the invasion of the Mongol prince Chaka, Smiltsena sought an alliance with Aldimir (Eltimir), the brother of the former ruler George Terter I, who had been deposed by her husband. Aldimir was accordingly married to Smiltsena's daughter Marina and, if this had not happened earlier, the widowed empress granted him the title of despotēs and invested him with a large dominion around Kran.

In 1299 Smiltsena attempted unsuccessfully to make an alliance with Serbian King Stefan Milutin to the exclusion of the latter's projected alignment with the Byzantine Emperor Andronikos II Palaiologos. She arranged a marriage between her daughter Theodora and Stefan Dečanski of Serbia, the eldest son of Milutin, and even made a proposal of marriage to him, offering him Bulgaria as dowry, but was refused.

Smiltsena was unable to strengthen her position and abandoned Tarnovo to Chaka, who installed himself as emperor in 1299.

== Later life ==
Smiltsena, Ivan II and their retinue settled in the possessions of Aldimir, where they may have remained even after the accession of Aldimir's nephew Theodore Svetoslav to the throne in 1300. Soon Aldimir entered into an alliance with Theodore Svetoslav and his own possessions around Kran were enlarged. As result Smiltsena and Ivan II were asked to leave Kran and they fled to Constantinople, where they were welcomed into the Byzantine court. In the Byzantine capital Smiltsena continued to play an active role in politics. In 1305 Aldemir appears to have entered into negotiations with the Byzantines against his nephew and Smiltsena was negotiating with the Byzantine government in Constantinople on behalf of either Aldimir or her son, but with Aldimir's subjugation by Theodore Svetoslav in the same year, she disappears into obscurity.

== Family ==
She married Smilets, who is credited with being descended "from the noblest family of the Bulgarians". The family held extensive lands between the Balkan Mountains and the Sredna Gora. They had three children:

- Marina (died 7 April 1355)
- Theodora (died 22 December 1320)
- Ivan

== Sources ==
- Pavlov, Plamen (2006). Българските царици [Bulgarian queens] (in Bulgarian). Велико Търново: ДАР-РХ. ISBN 954-9489-04-3.

Smiltsena Palaiologina Palaiologos Born: ? Died: ?
Royal titles
Preceded by Maria	Empress consort of Bulgaria; 1292–1298	Succeeded by Elena
