= Dorotheus of Bulgaria =

Patriarch of Bulgaria from 1300 to 1315

- Patriarch of Bulgaria
- Church: Bulgarian Orthodox Church
- Installed: 1300
- Term ended: c. 1315
- Predecessor: Joachim III
- Successor: Romanus

Personal details
- Denomination: Eastern Orthodox Church

Dorotheus (Bulgarian: Доротей) was a Patriarch of the Bulgarian Orthodox Church in the beginning of the 14th century. His name is known only from the medieval Book of Boril where he is listed as the seventh Patriarch presiding over the Bulgarian Church from Tarnovo, the capital of the Bulgarian Empire. Dorotheus led the Bulgarian Church during the reign of Emperor Theodore Svetoslav (r. 1300–1321), who had his predecessor Patriarch Joachim III executed for treason in 1300.

== Sources ==
- Андреев (Andreev), Йордан (Jordan); Лазаров (Lazarov), Иван (Ivan); Павлов (Pavlov), Пламен (Plamen) (2012). Кой кой е в средновековна България [Who is Who in Medieval Bulgaria] (in Bulgarian). Изток Запад (Iztok Zapad). ISBN 978-619-152-012-1.

Titles of Chalcedonian Christianity
Preceded by Joachim III	Patriarch of Bulgaria; 1300–c. 1315	Succeeded by Romanus
