= Kara-Kishek =

- Born: 13th century Golden Horde
- Died: After 1325; Europe
- Family: Borjigin
- Father: Chaka
- Mother: Mongol concubine
- Occupation: Mercenary commander in Vidin

Kara-Kishek or Qara-Kesek (Bulgarian: Кара-Кишек; fl. 1302–1325) was a Mongol nobleman, the son of Chaka, himself the son of Golden Horde kingmaker Nogai Khan.

The new khan, Toqta, defeated and murdered Nogai and Chaka in 1299–1300.

In 1302, Kara-Kishek and his two relatives Dzherik-Temir (Джерик-Темир) and Yol-Kutlu (Юлукутлу) fled with 3,000 horsemen to Shishman of Vidin. Shishman, a Cuman and previous subject to Nogai Khan, gave refuge to them and they still lived in Vidin at the time of Egyptian chronicler Baybar (died 1325). Kara-Kishek and the horsemen raided alongside Shishman, and these Tatar mercenaries were important in the victories of Shishman and his son, Bulgarian emperor Michael Shishman (r. 1323–1330).

== See also ==
- Kara-Kisek-oglan (Кара-Кисек-оглан)

== Sources ==
- Lazarov, Ivan (1992). Документи за политическата история на средновековна България: XII-XIV в. Изд. къща "Аста".
- Petrov, Viktor (2021), Татарите на Кара-Кишек и ролята им за военнополитическия възход на Шишмановци (1302–1330 г.) [The Tatars of Qara-Kesek and their Role for the Military and Political Rise of the Shishmanids (1302–1330)], pp. 28-
- Vásáry, István (2005). Cumans and Tatars: Oriental Military in the Pre-Ottoman Balkans, 1185–1365. Cambridge University Press. ISBN 978-0-521-83756-9.
