= Kazanlak Municipality =

Coordinates: 42°37′N 25°24′E

Kazanlak Municipality Община Казанлък
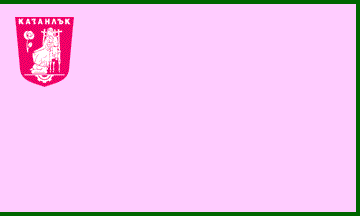
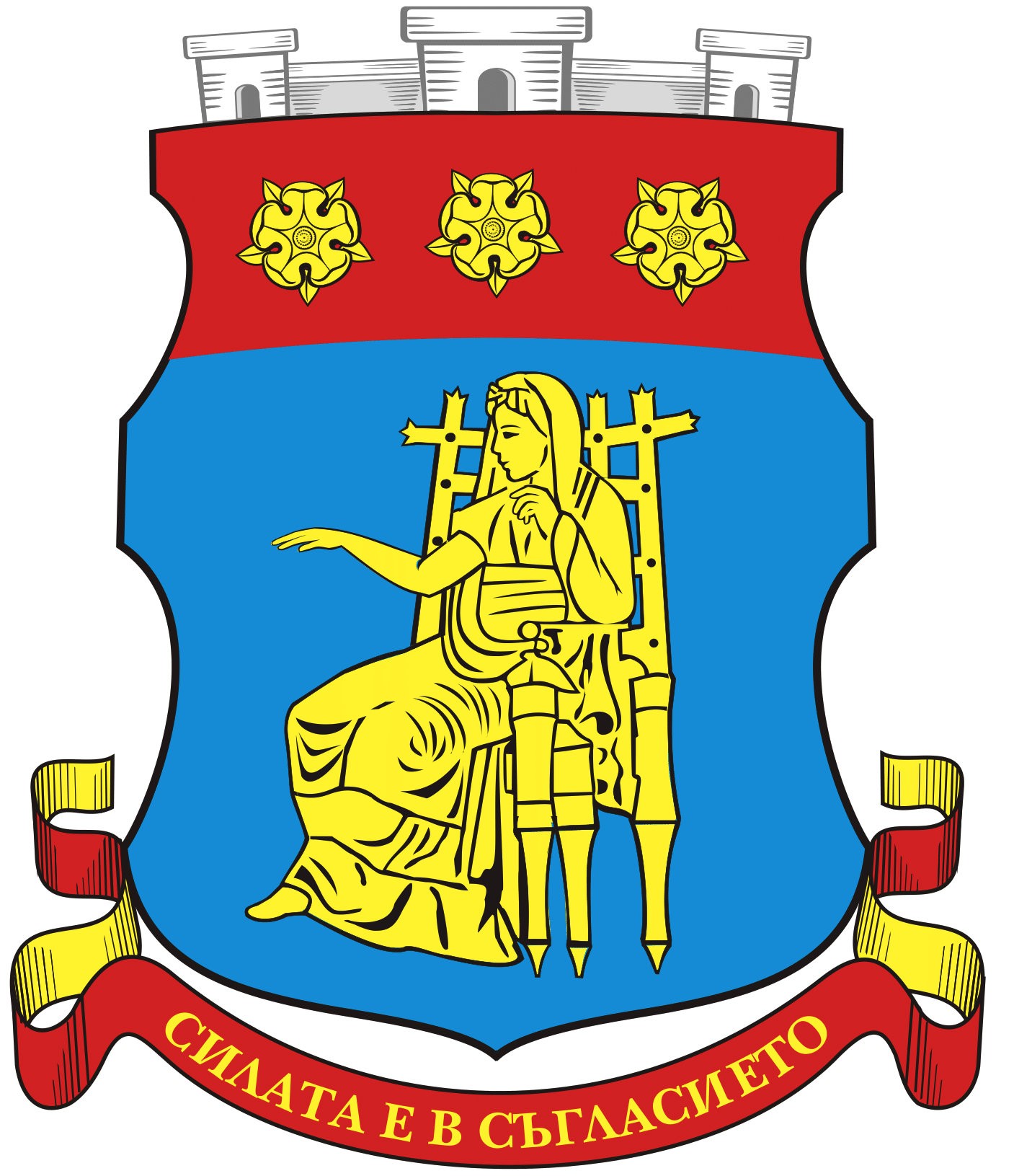
- Flag Coat of arms

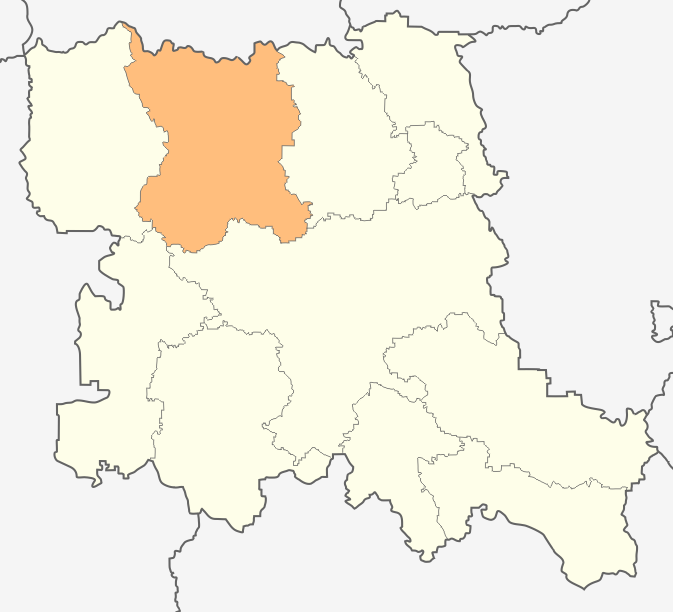
- Country: Bulgaria
- Province: Stara Zagora Province
- Seat: Kazanlak

Area
  - Total: 634.781 km^{2} (245.090 sq mi)

Population (2024)
  - Total: 66,169
  - Density: 104.24/km^{2} (269.98/sq mi)
- Website: www.kazanlak.bg

Kazanlak Municipality (Bulgarian: Община Казанлък) is a municipality in central Bulgaria, part of Stara Zagora Province. Its administrative seat is the town of Kazanlak, which lies in the centre of the country between the Stara Planina and the Sredna Gora mountain ranges, 194 km east of Sofia and 185 km west of Burgas.

== Geography ==
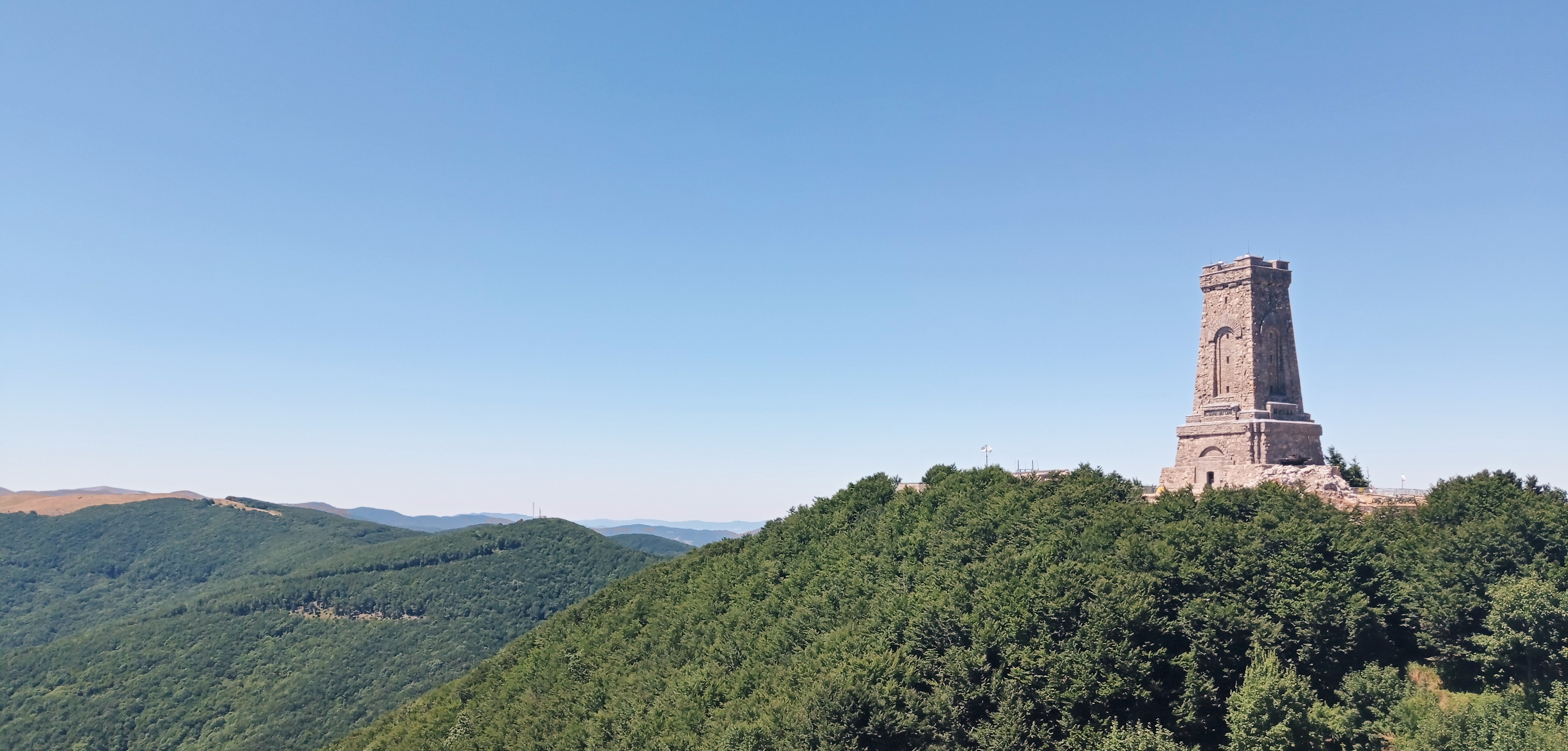
Shipka Monument in the Balkan Mountains

The municipality lies in the northern part of Stara Zagora Province. With an area of 634.781 km² it is the second largest of the eleven municipalities of the province, accounting for 12.31% of its territory. It borders Maglizh Municipality to the east, Stara Zagora Municipality to the south, Bratya Daskalovi Municipality to the south-west, Pavel Banya Municipality to the west, and Gabrovo and Tryavna municipalities (in Gabrovo Province) to the north.

The northern third of the municipal territory is occupied by the southern slopes of the Shipka Mountain, part of the central Balkan Mountains. The highest point of the municipality is the Shipchenski Ispolin peak at 1,523.4 m, situated about 5 km south-west of the Shipka Pass. South of the Shipka Mountain stretch the central parts of the Kazanlak Valley, where elevations range from 320 to 400 m; the lowest point of the municipality, 307 m, lies east of the village of Razhena, on the bed of the Tundzha river on the boundary with Maglizh Municipality.

The relief of the central plain is largely level, with an average elevation of 400 to 450 m above sea level, and three of the medium-high peaks of the central Balkan Mountains rise close by: Ispolin (1,524 m), Shipka (1,326 m) and Buzludzha (1,441 m).

== Administrative subdivisions ==
The administrative centre is the town of Kazanlak, which is also the second largest population centre in Stara Zagora Province. The municipality also includes the towns of Kran and Shipka, the latter being the smallest town in the province with a population of 1,233.

Apart from the three towns, there are 17 villages, the largest one being Koprinka, with a population of 2,492.

- Buzovgrad
- Cherganovo
- Dolno Izvorovo
- Dunavtsi
- Enina
- Golyamo Dryanovo
- Gorno Cherkovishte
- Gorno Izvorovo
- Hadzhidimitrovo
- Kanchevo
- Kazanlak
- Koprinka
- Kran
- Ovoshtnik
- Razhena
- Rozovo
- Sheynovo
- Shipka
- Srednogorovo
- Yasenovo

== Demographics ==
According to the 2021 census, the population of Kazanlak Municipality was 66,169. The population density at 7 September 2021 was 103.8 inhabitants per km². Between the censuses of 2011 and 2021, the population of the municipality decreased by 5,899 people, or 9.5%, while between 2002 and 2021 the total decline reached 14,951 inhabitants. According to data from the National Statistical Institute, the population in 2023 stood at 64,041 people, with 544 births registered that year and a mechanical (migration) increase of -22 people.

The town of Kazanlak alone accounts for the majority of the municipal population, with 42,208 residents at the time of the 2021 census. By the end of 2024, the population of the town had fallen further to 41,537 according to the National Statistical Institute.

== Economy ==
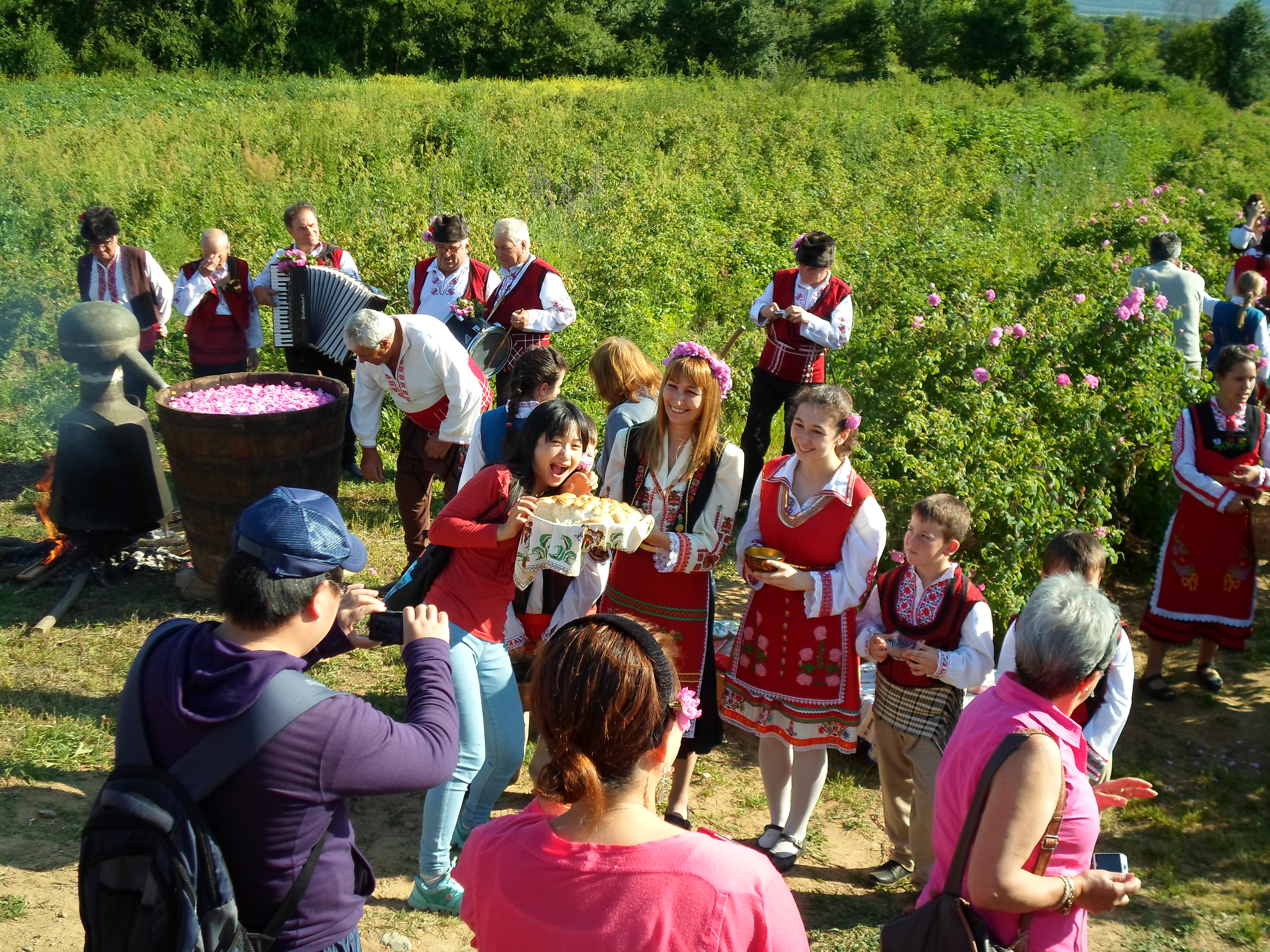
oil-bearing rose picking in Rozovo

Kazanlak Municipality is the main economic hub of the Kazanlak Valley and the second largest economy in Stara Zagora Province. Its administrative centre, Kazanlak, has a well-developed armament and mechanical engineering sector and is also a centre of the textile industry.

Agriculture also plays a significant role in the local economy. The climatic conditions and soils, like elsewhere in the Rose Valley, are particularly favourable for the cultivation of the oil-bearing rose, mint, lavender, basil, marigold, fruit and forage crops. Kazanlak is the centre of a rose-growing region with centuries-old traditions in the extraction of rose oil and other essential oils, and the Kazanlak oil-bearing rose and rose oil are emblems of Bulgaria. Some of the country's largest sour-cherry and cherry orchards are also located in the municipality.

== Transport ==
A 24.3 km section of railway line No. 3 Sofia–Karlovo–Burgas, operated by the Bulgarian State Railways, crosses the municipality from west to east. Six roads of the Republican road network run wholly or partly through the territory, with a total length of 100.8 km after deducting a 6.6 km duplicated section east of the town of Kazanlak. These include a 31.1 km section of the first class I-5 road Ruse–Veliko Tarnovo–Stara Zagora–Haskovo–Makaza, a 21.1 km stretch of the first class I-6 road Gyueshevo–Sofia–Karlovo–Burgas, the first 9 km section of the second class II-56 road Shipka–Brezovo–Plovdiv, the first 21.3 km of the third class III-608, the whole 12.3 km length of the third class III-5005, and the whole 7.6 km length of the third class III-5601 road.

== Tourism and protected areas ==
Tourism in Kazanlak Municipality has well-established traditions, with excellent prospects for further development based on the proximity of the Central Balkan National Park, the unique archaeological monuments from the time of the Thracians, the Kazanlak oil-bearing rose and the Rose Festival. Nine major Thracian tombs are located in the area around Kazanlak, two of which are of global importance and attract visitors from Bulgaria and abroad: the Thracian Tomb of Kazanlak and the tomb discovered in 1993.

For the protection of the rich biodiversity of the municipality, three categories of protected areas have been declared: two reserves, one natural landmark and one protected locality. The Kamenshtitsa Reserve covers 10,184 decares of forest in the lands of the village of Enina and was declared with the aim of preserving characteristic ecosystems of Hungarian oak, protecting mixed broadleaved forests aged 60 to 170 years (Hungarian oak, beech, hornbeam, sycamore, manna ash, oriental hornbeam, ash) as well as habitats of rare and protected plants and animals.

== Government ==
The municipality is part of the South-East Planning Region (NUTS 2 level), which is composed of the provinces of Burgas, Sliven, Stara Zagora and Yambol. As of 2024, the mayor of Kazanlak Municipality is Galina Stoyanova.

== Gallery ==
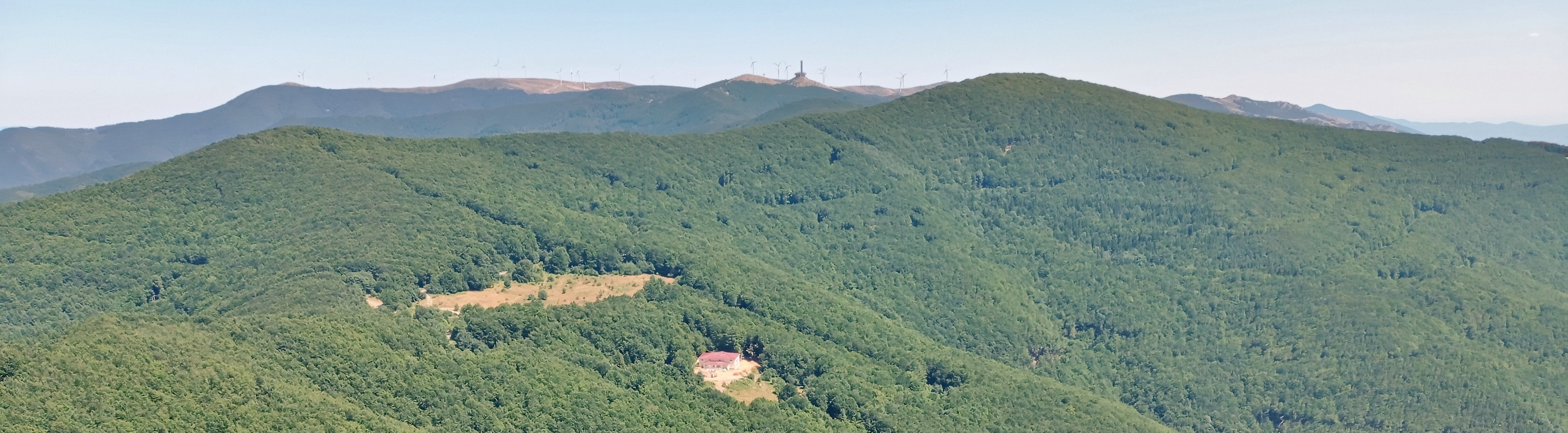
A view to the Buzludzha monument, Balkan Mountains

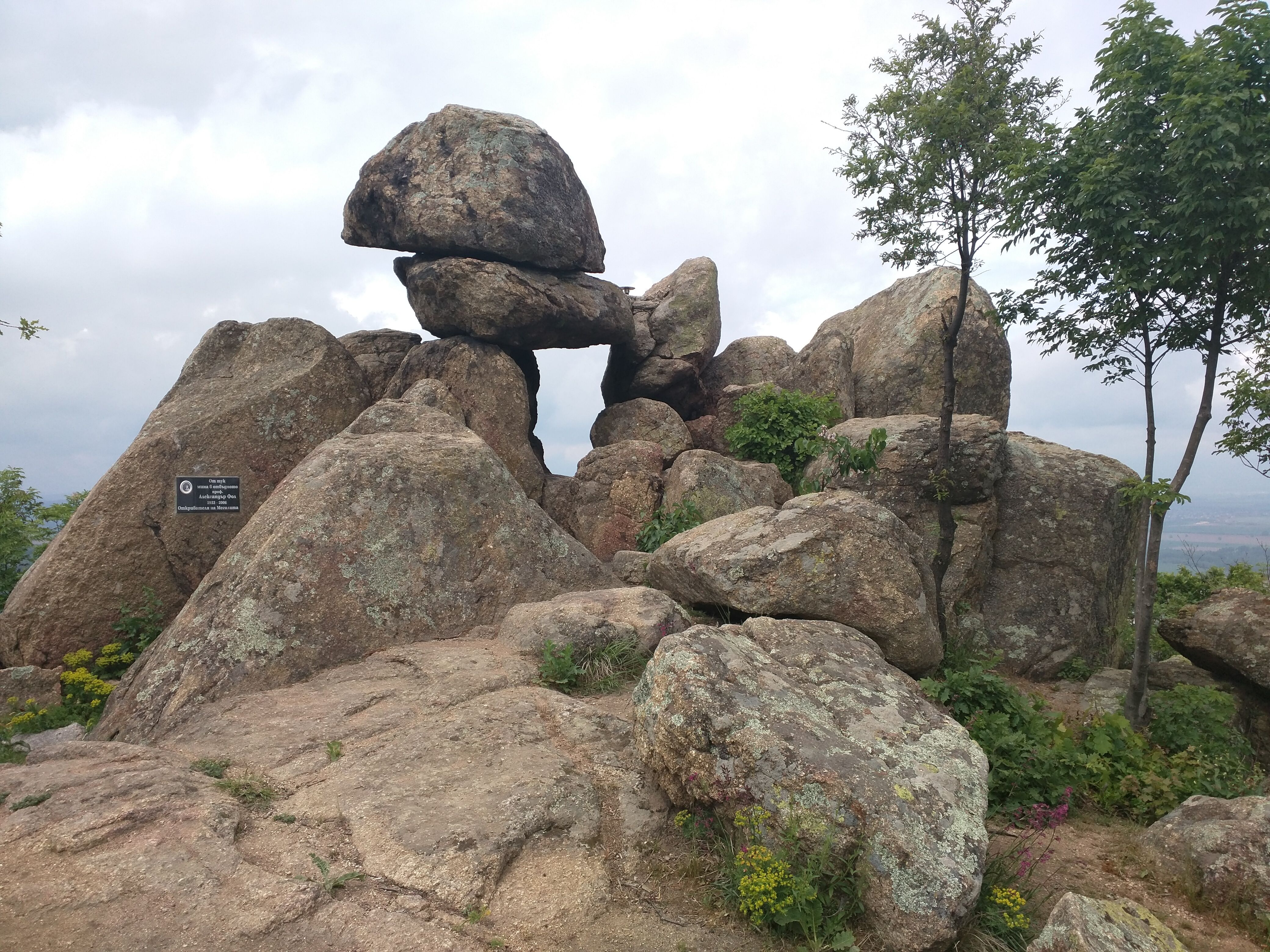
Buzovgrad megalith

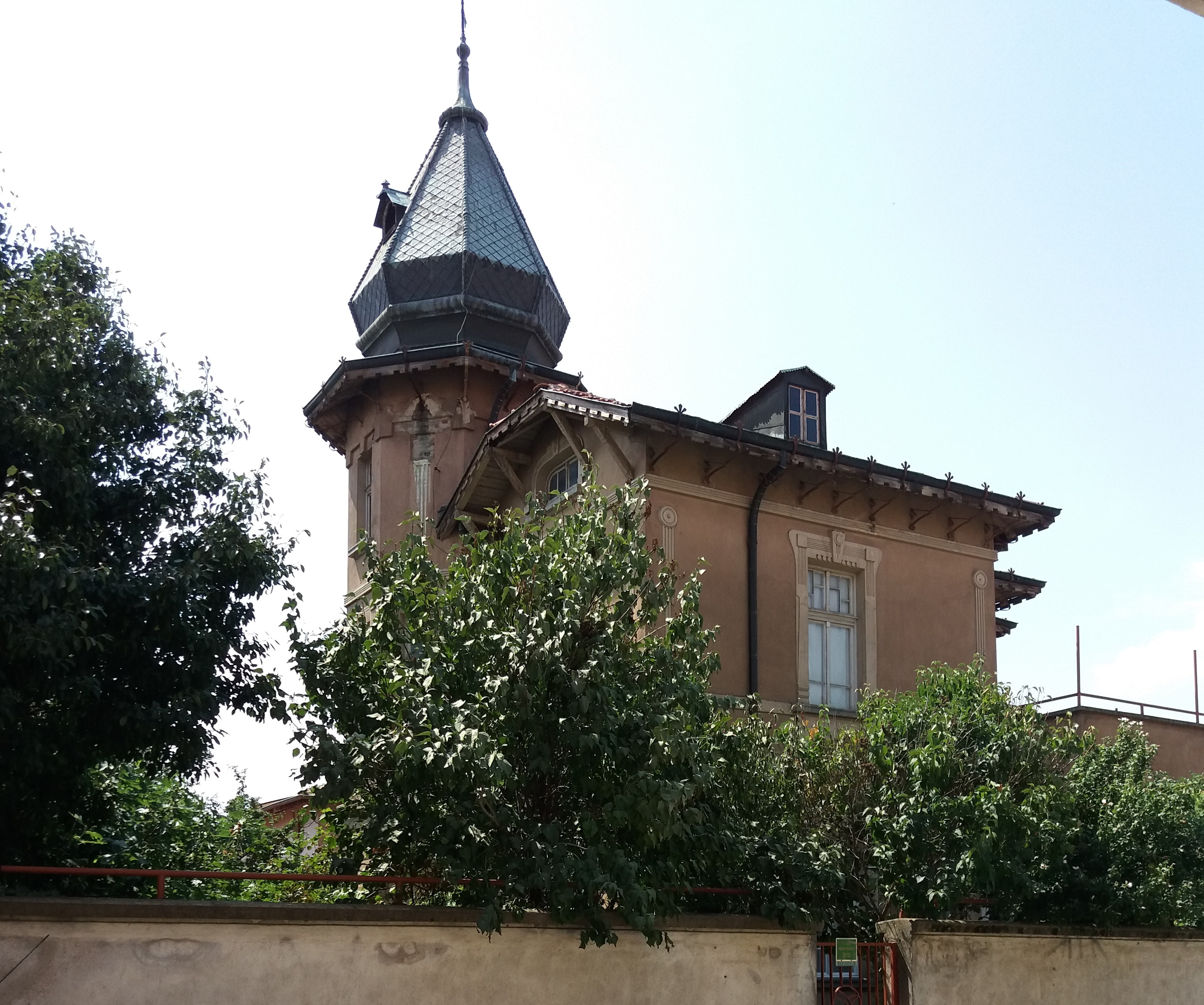
A historical house in Kazanlak

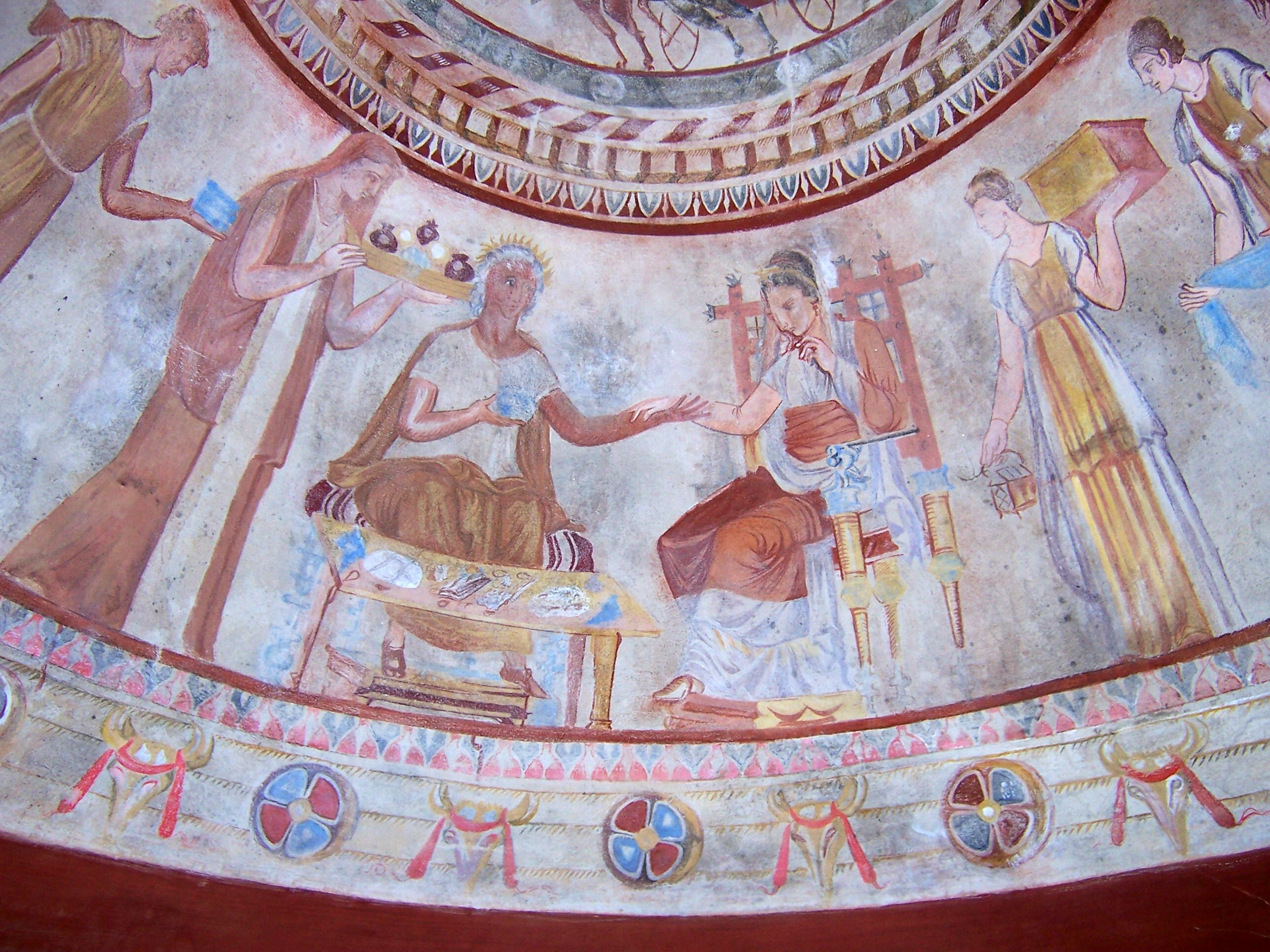
The Thracian Tomb of Kazanlak

== See also ==
- Kazanlak Valley
- Stara Zagora Province
