= Joachim III of Bulgaria =

Patriarch of Bulgaria from 1282 to 1300

- Patriarch of Bulgaria
- Church: Bulgarian Orthodox Church
- Installed: c. 1282
- Term ended: 1300
- Predecessor: Macarius
- Successor: Dorotheus

Personal details
- Denomination: Eastern Orthodox Church

Joachim III (Bulgarian: Йоаким III) was the Patriarch of the Bulgarian Orthodox Church between c. 1282 and 1300, when the Second Bulgarian Empire reached its lowest point of decline during the reign of the emperors George Terter I, Smilets and Chaka. He was executed for treason by emperor Theodore Svetoslav in 1300. The Church did not recognize his guilt and his name was included in the list of Bulgarian Patriarchs in the Book of Boril. His seat was Tarnovo, the capital of Bulgaria.

== Early career ==
Between 1272 and 1274 Joachim was included in the Bulgarian delegation that visited Constantinople to discuss the proposal of Pope Gregory X to the Byzantine emperor Michael VIII Palaeologus to end the Great Schism that divided the Eastern Orthodox Church and the Roman Catholic Church since 1054. In Constantinople Joachim established contacts with the future Pope Nicholas IV, the leader of the western delegation, and it is likely that initially he was inclined to support a union between the two Churches. However, the Bulgarian empress-consort Maria Palaiologina Kantakouzene (r. 1269–1279), a niece of Michael VIII and in a lifelong feud with her uncle, urged the Church to oppose the Byzantines, who were inclined to negotiate with the Catholics. The Bulgarian Orthodox Church, that considered itself a centre of the Orthodox Christianity ever since the fall of Constantinople to the armies of the Fourth Crusade in 1204, strongly opposed the proposed union and the apparent willingness of the Byzantines to make concessions. The then Bulgarian Patriarch Ignatius was called "pillar of Orthodoxy". It seems that Joachim remained loyal to the position of the Bulgarian Patriarchate, which explains his quick rise in the church hierarchy.

== Patriarch ==
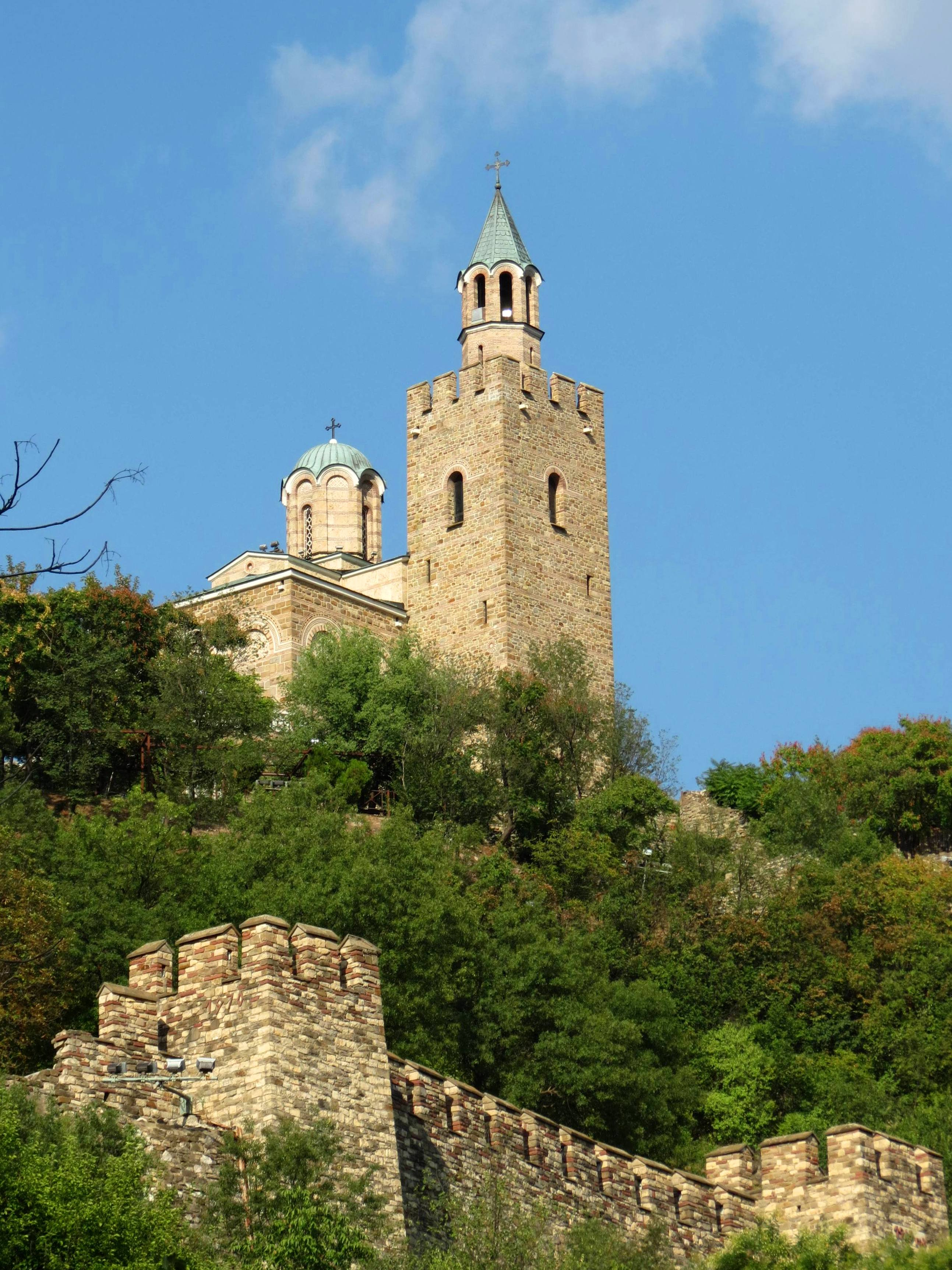
The Patriarchal Cathedral of the Holy Ascension of God rising over the walls of Tsarevets, Tarnovo

Joachim III was enthroned in the beginning of the rule of emperor George Terter I (r. 1280–1292). However, soon after that Joachim III refused to acknowledge the emperor's second marriage to Kira Maria because his first wife Maria Terter was still alive. After George Terter divorced Maria in 1279 he sent her and his first born son Theodore Svetoslav as hostages to the Byzantine Empire. The Patriarch refused to allow George Terter I to the church sacraments until he conceded to abandon Kira Maria and remarry his first wife, after he secured her return from Byzantine captivity in 1282.

In 1285 Joachim III was sent to Constantinople to liberate Theodore Svetoslav, who still remained hostage. After difficult negotiations the Patriarch was successful in his mission. In return he agreed that Theodore Svetoslav was to be betrothed to the daughter of the Byzantine megas stratopedarches John Synadenos.

In 1291 Pope Nicholas IV sent a letter to Joachim III, dated 23 March, reminding the Bulgarian Patriarch of their old friendship and urging him to join the Roman Church. The Pope also sent a letter to George Terter I expressing his hope to see Bulgaria return to the authority of Rome, alluding to the union between Bulgaria and Rome concluded in 1205 during the reign of emperor Kaloyan. Despite some hesitations Joachim III maintained the firm position of the Bulgarian Orthodox Church on the matter and the papal initiative failed to produce any tangible results.

Joachim III's tenure coincided with a very difficult period for the Bulgarian state when the Mongol menace was omnipresent in all levels of Bulgarian society. Although George Terter I had to become a vassal to the Mongol Golden Horde and sent to Theodore Svetoslav as a hostage in 1285, the devastating Mongol raids persisted. Unable to confront the Mongols and their leader Nogai Khan, in 1292 he abandoned the throne and fled to the Byzantine Empire. In 1292 Joachim III crowned as Emperor the influential magnate Smilets (r. 1292–1298), whose family held extensive lands between the Balkan Mountains and Sredna Gora. In 1299 he crowned the Mongol Chaka, son of Nogai Khan, who fled to Tarnovo in the company of Theodore Svetoslav as a result of a civil war in the Golden Horde.

== Death ==
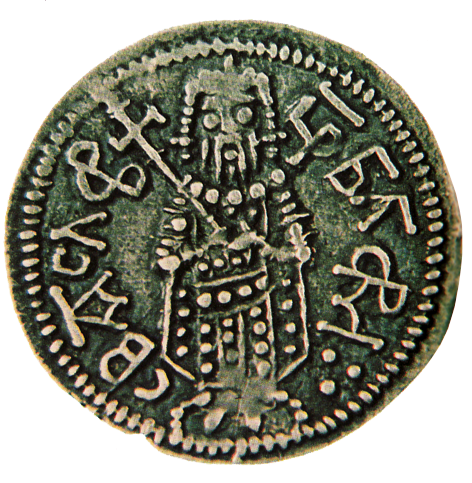
A silver coin depicting Theodore Svetoslav

By 1300 Theodore Svetoslav gathered the support of the nobility and deposed the unpopular Chaka. Chaka was strangled and his head was sent to the Khan of the Golden Horde Toqta. Upon his accession to the throne Theodore Svetoslav acted ruthlessly to deal with all opposition. Joachim III was accused of treason because Theodore Svetoslav "had long suspected that he [Joachim III] wanted to turn him over to the Mongols". The Patriarch was condemned to death and thrown from the walls of Tsarevets into the gorge of the Yantra River.

The reasons for the execution of Joachim III, who had previously saved Theodore Svetoslav from Byzantine captivity, are not entirely clear. Historians Ivan Bozhilov and Vasil Gyuzelev speculate that the Patriarch was among the responsible dignitaries for a Mongol invasion in 1285, after which Theodore Svetoslav had to be sent a hostage in the Golden Horde. John Van Antwerp Fine Jr. suggests that the alleged treachery might be linked to the obscure period when Smilets overthrew George Terter I. Others believe that the verdict was a result of the desire of the new emperor to seek personal retribution from those who he deemed responsible for the hardships of his youth. However, most agree that the actions of Theodore Svetoslav consolidated the shaken imperial authority and paved the way for his long and successful reign. Bulgaria prospered between 1300 and 1321; the Mongol interference was dealt with and the country even regained Bessarabia from the Golden Horde.

The Bulgarian Orthodox Church decisively opposed the charges against Joachim III and considered the emperor's actions personal vengeance. It included his name in the list of the Patriarchs, preserved in the Book of Boril, and mentioned him in the liturgies. The litanies in his honour indicate that Joachim III was remembered with respect in the Church. He was the second Bulgarian Patriarch executed by the ruling monarch after Vissarion, condemned by Ivan Asen II (r. 1218–1241) after refusing to bless his third marriage.

== Footnotes ==
=== Notes ===
a: George Terter married Kira Maria in 1279 after her brother Ivan Asen III seized the Bulgarian crown with Byzantine support during the chaos caused by the Uprising of Ivaylo. Eventually Ivan Asen III was ousted from the throne and George Terter was proclaimed emperor on his place.

== Sources ==
- Андреев (Andreev), Йордан (Jordan); Лалков (Lalkov), Милчо (Milcho) (1996). Българските ханове и царе (The Bulgarian Khans and Tsars) (in Bulgarian). Велико Търново (Veliko Tarnovo): Абагар (Abagar). ISBN 954-427-216-X.
- Андреев (Andreev), Йордан (Jordan); Лазаров (Lazarov), Иван (Ivan); Павлов (Pavlov), Пламен (Plamen) (2012). Кой кой е в средновековна България [Who is Who in Medieval Bulgaria] (in Bulgarian). Изток Запад (Iztok Zapad). ISBN 978-619-152-012-1.
- Божилов (Bozhilov), Иван (Ivan); Гюзелев (Gyuzelev), Васил (Vasil) (1999). История на средновековна България VII–XIV век (History of Medieval Bulgaria VII–XIV centuries) (in Bulgarian). София (Sofia): Анубис (Anubis). ISBN 954-426-204-0.
- Fine, J. (1987). The Late Medieval Balkans, A Critical Survey from the Late Twelfth Century to the Ottoman Conquest. University of Michigan Press. ISBN 0-472-10079-3.
- Polemis, Demetrios I. (1968). The Doukai: A Contribution to Byzantine Prosopography. London, United Kingdom: The Athlone Press.
- Златарски (Zlatarski), Васил (Vasil) (1972) [1940]. История на българската държава през Средните векове. Том III. Второ българско царство. България при Асеневци (1185–1280). (History of the Bulgarian state in the Middle Ages. Volume III. Second Bulgarian Empire. Bulgaria under the Asen Dynasty (1185–1280)) (in Bulgarian) (2 ed.). София (Sofia): Наука и изкуство (Nauka i izkustvo).

Titles of Chalcedonian Christianity
Preceded by Macarius	Patriarch of Bulgaria c. 1282–1300	Succeeded by Dorotheus
