= Kran, Stara Zagora Province =

Kran Крън
- Kran
- Coordinates: 42°40′1″N 25°22′59″E
- Country: Bulgaria
- Province (Oblast): Stara Zagora

Government
  - Mayor: Temenuzhka Lyutskanova (GERB)
- Elevation: 439 m (1,440 ft)

Population (2010)
  - Total: 3,424
- Time zone: UTC+2 (EET)
  - Summer (DST): UTC+3 (EEST)
- Postal Code: 6140
- Area code: 04338

Kran (Bulgarian: Крън, pronounced [ˈkrɤn]; also transliterated as Krun or Krǎn) is a town in central Bulgaria. It is located just south of the Balkan Mountains and is administratively part of Kazanlak Municipality, Stara Zagora Province. Kran was an important castle of the Second Bulgarian Empire in the 13th–14th century. Among the local sights are a conserved ancient Thracian tomb, a much older Thracian sanctuary and the ruins of the medieval fortress.

== Geography ==
Kran lies some 5 km (3.1 mi) north of the city of Kazanlak in the homonymous Kazanlak Valley. It is situated in direct vicinity of the Shipka Pass, a major pass through the Central Balkan Mountains. The mountains stand just to the north of the town. Among the amenities that the town offers are a motel and a camping site. As of 2010, Kran was the most populous village in Stara Zagora Province. Due to the village's population, the mayor Temenuzhka Lyutskanova formally suggested that it be proclaimed a town. In October 2011, Kran was formally declared a town by a decision of the Council of Ministers.

The industry of the town is represented by the spring factory Zavod za pruzhini AD, founded in 1974 as part of the Kazanlak-based Arsenal AD firearms manufacturing company. Since 1999, the factory has been a separate joint-stock company.

== History ==
Kran is located in the so-called Valley of the Thracian Kings, a region of Bulgaria known for the abundance of Thracian sites and artifacts. In 1995, a team of archaeologists headed by Georgi Kitov unearthed a Thracian tomb under Sarafova Mogila, a mound near the town. The tomb is known as Kran II and was built in the 4th century BC. The tomb is notable for the earliest known example of painted friezes in Thracian architecture. It is also among the earliest to make use of bricks and mortar as construction materials. The conservation of the Kran II tomb was completed in 2009 and the site was opened to the public. A Thracian sanctuary was discovered by archaeologists near the town in 2009. The sanctuary dates to 2200–1900 BC and also includes nine burials of infants.

Kran is first mentioned under its modern name during the High Middle Ages. In 1190, the surviving Byzantine troops of a failed anti-Bulgarian campaign retreated to Kran en route to Beroia (today Stara Zagora).

=== Despotate of Kran ===
In the late 13th century, the fortress of Kran emerged as the capital of the Kran Despotate, an appanage of the Second Bulgarian Empire under the rule of despot Aldimir, younger brother of the Bulgarian Emperor George Terter I (r. 1280–1292). Aldimir may have already been in charge of the fortress in the 1280s and early 1290s, and he was certainly the lord of Kran from 1298 to 1305, under the regent queen Smiltsena and his own nephew Theodore Svetoslav (r. 1300–1322). In that year, the despotate was annexed by Theodore Svetoslav and direct rule from Tarnovo was restored. At the height of Aldimir's reign as despot of Kran, the fortress was the capital of a domain which extended from Yambol and Karnobat in the east to Kazanlak or Karlovo in the west.

The despotate appears to have been restored at some point thereafter, however, as the father of Bulgarian Emperor Ivan Alexander (r. 1331–1371), Sratsimir, is mentioned as the despot of Kran before and during the rule of his son.

The ruins of the medieval castle are located on the rocks north of the town. The fortress is a descendant of an earlier Byzantine settlement and a fortification from the 7th–8th century. The castle's natural position atop a cliff facilitated its defence, though it was also supported by thick walls and several defensive towers.

=== Formation of a modern settlement ===
The modern settlement was perhaps founded in the 1370s or 1380s, after the castle was captured and destroyed by the Ottomans in the aftermath of the Bulgarian–Ottoman wars. In Ottoman times, it was known as Hasat (Хасът, "The Has", a kind of Ottoman estate). The name was changed back to the medieval Bulgarian appellation in 1906.
