= Ivan II of Bulgaria =

Tsar of Bulgaria from 1298 to 1299

Ivan II

Tsar of Bulgaria
- Reign: 1298–1299
- Predecessor: Smilets of Bulgaria
- Successor: Tsar Chaka
- Died: before 1330
- House: Smilets dynasty
- Father: Smilets of Bulgaria
- Mother: Smiltsena Palaiologina

Ivan II (Bulgarian: Иван II, or Йоан II, Ioan II, also styled inconsistently Ivan IV or Ioan IV), reigned as tsar of Bulgaria from 1298 to 1299. The date of his birth is unknown, but probably not much earlier than c. 1290. He died as a monk in exile before 1330.

== Life ==
Ivan II succeeded his father Smilets as emperor in Tărnovo in 1298. The new ruler was a child, and the government was in the hands of his mother, the unnamed daughter of sebastocrator Constantine Palaiologos and niece of Michael VIII Palaiologos called simply "Smiltsena" ("wife of Smilets"). The widowed empress defeated Smilets' brothers Radoslav and Voysil (Vojsil), who sought refuge in the Byzantine Empire and entered into Byzantine service. To meet this threat and the invasion of the Mongol prince Chaka, Ivan II's mother sought an alliance with Aldimir (Eltimir), the brother of the former ruler George Terter I. Aldimir was accordingly married to Smilets' daughter Marina (Marija) and, if this had not happened earlier, was given the title of despotēs and invested with an extensive landholding around Krăn. In 1299 the Bulgarian government attempted unsuccessfully to ally with Serbian King Stefan Milutin to the exclusion of the latter's projected alignment with the Byzantine Emperor Andronikos II Palaiologos.

The regents of Ivan II were unable to strengthen their position, and abandoned Tărnovo to Chaka, who installed himself as emperor in 1299. Ivan II and his retinue settled in the possessions of Aldimir, where they may have remained even after the accession of Aldimir's nephew Theodore Svetoslav to the throne in 1300. In 1305, Ivan II's mother was negotiating with the Byzantine government in Constantinople on behalf of either Aldimir or her son, but with Aldimir's subjugation by Theodore Svetoslav in the same year, the family disappears into obscurity.

Ivan II spent the remainder of his life as an exile in Byzantium, under the name Iōannēs Komnēnos Doukas Angelos Branas Palaiologos, and shortly before his death he became a monk under the name Joasaph. He died before 1330.

== Sources ==
- John V. A. Fine Jr., The Late Medieval Balkans, Ann Arbor, 1987.

Preceded by Smilets	Tsar of Bulgaria; 1298–1299	Succeeded by Chaka
