= Smilets of Bulgaria =

Tsar of Bulgaria from 1292 to 1298

Smilets

Tsar of Bulgaria
- Reign: 1292–1298
- Predecessor: George I of Bulgaria
- Successor: Ivan II of Bulgaria
- Died: 1298
- Spouse: Smiltsena Palaiologina
- Issue: Marina Smilets of Bulgaria; Teodora of Bulgaria, Queen of Serbia; Ivan II of Bulgaria
- House: Smilets dynasty

Smilets (Bulgarian: Смилец) reigned as tsar of Bulgaria from 1292 to 1298.

== Life ==
Although Smilets is credited with being descended "from the noblest family of the Bulgarians", his antecedents are completely unknown. Judging by the landholdings of Smilets’ brothers Radoslav and Vojsil, the family held extensive lands between the Balkan Mountains and Sredna Gora.

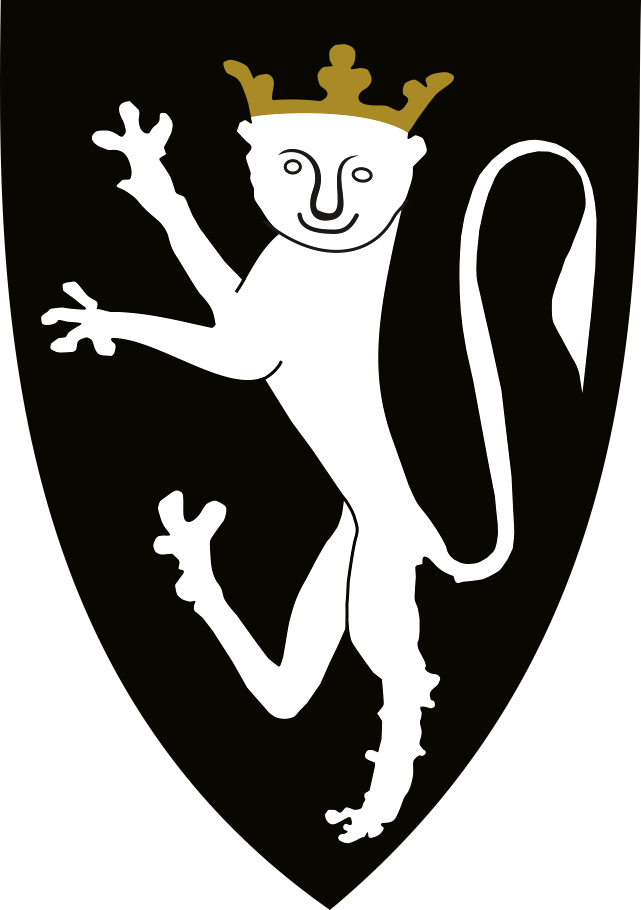
Coat of arms of Smilets

Before ascending the throne replacing George I in 1292, Smilets had married daughter of the sebastokratōr Constantine Palaiologos, a half-brother of Emperor Michael VIII Palaiologos. Apart from the information that Smilets became emperor of Bulgaria according to the wishes of Nogai Khan, we know nothing of the circumstances of Smilec's accession. Smilets was crowned by Patriarch Joachim III. Joachim was executed for treason in 1300 by emperor Theodore Svetoslav, George I's son, and historian John Van Antwerp Fine Jr. theorizes that the alleged treachery might be linked to the obscure period when Smilets overthrew George Terter I.

The reign of Smilets has been considered the height of Mongol overlordship in Bulgaria. Nevertheless, Mongol raids may have continued, as in 1297 and 1298. Since these raids pillaged parts of Thrace (then entirely in Byzantine hands), perhaps Bulgaria was not one of their objectives. In fact, in spite of the usually pro-Byzantine policy of Nogai, Smilets was quickly involved in an unsuccessful war against the Byzantine Empire at the beginning of his reign.

About 1296/1297 Smilets married his daughter Theodora to the future Serbian King Stefan Dečanski, and this union produced Serbian king Stefan Dušan.

In 1298 Smilets disappears from the pages of history, apparently after the beginning of Chaka's invasion. Smilets may have been killed by Chaka or died of natural causes while the enemy advanced against him. Smilets was briefly succeeded by his son Ivan II.

Smilets Point in Antarctica is named after Smilets of Bulgaria.

== Family ==
Smilec was married to an unnamed Byzantine princess, daughter of sebastokratōr Constantine Palaiologos. She was called just Smiltsena (Bulgarian: Смилцена; the wife of Smilets). By her he had at least three children:

1. Ivan II, who succeeded as emperor of Bulgaria 1298–1299/1300
2. Teodora of Bulgaria, Queen of Serbia
3. Marina

== Sources ==
- Fine, J. (1987). The Late Medieval Balkans, A Critical Survey from the Late Twelfth Century to the Ottoman Conquest. University of Michigan Press. ISBN 0-472-10079-3.

Preceded by George Terter I	Tsar of Bulgaria; 1292–1298	Succeeded by Ivan II
