= Teodora of Bulgaria, Queen of Serbia =

Teodora
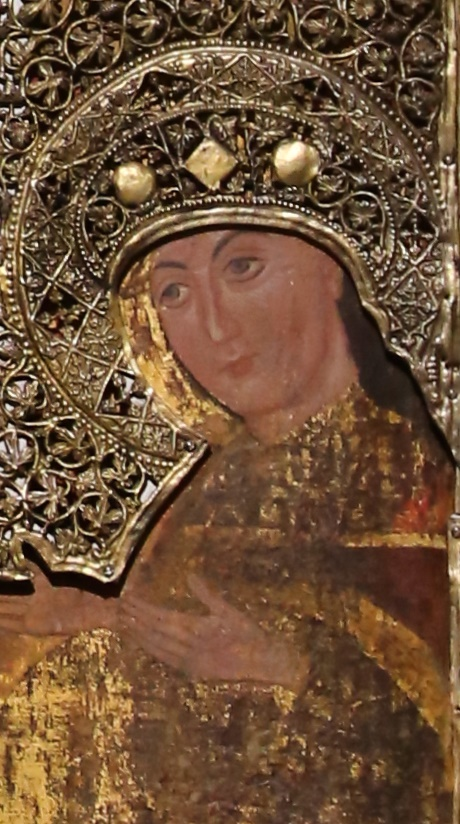
- Teodora portrayed as donor in an icon of Saint Nicholas in Bari

Queen consort of Serbia
- Tenure: 29 October 1321 – 20 December 1322
- Born: 1290s Bulgarian Empire
- Died: After 6 January 1322; Zvečan, Serbian Kingdom
- Burial: Zvečan
- Spouse: Stefan Dečanski
- Issue: Stefan Dušan
- House: Smilets dynasty
- Father: Smilets of Bulgaria
- Mother: Smiltsena Palaiologina

Theodora of Bulgaria (Bulgarian and Serbian: Теодора) was a Bulgarian princess and Queen consort of Serbia, the first wife of Stefan Dečanski. Teodora was the second daughter of Tsar Smilets of Bulgaria and Smiltsena Palaiologina. Teodora is best remembered as a patron of the Arts, Music and Literature. Among her heirloom, one of the most famous rings from the fourteenth century was found, now on display in the National Museum in Belgrade. That golden ring has the carved inscription: "May the Lord help the one who wears it."

== Queenship ==
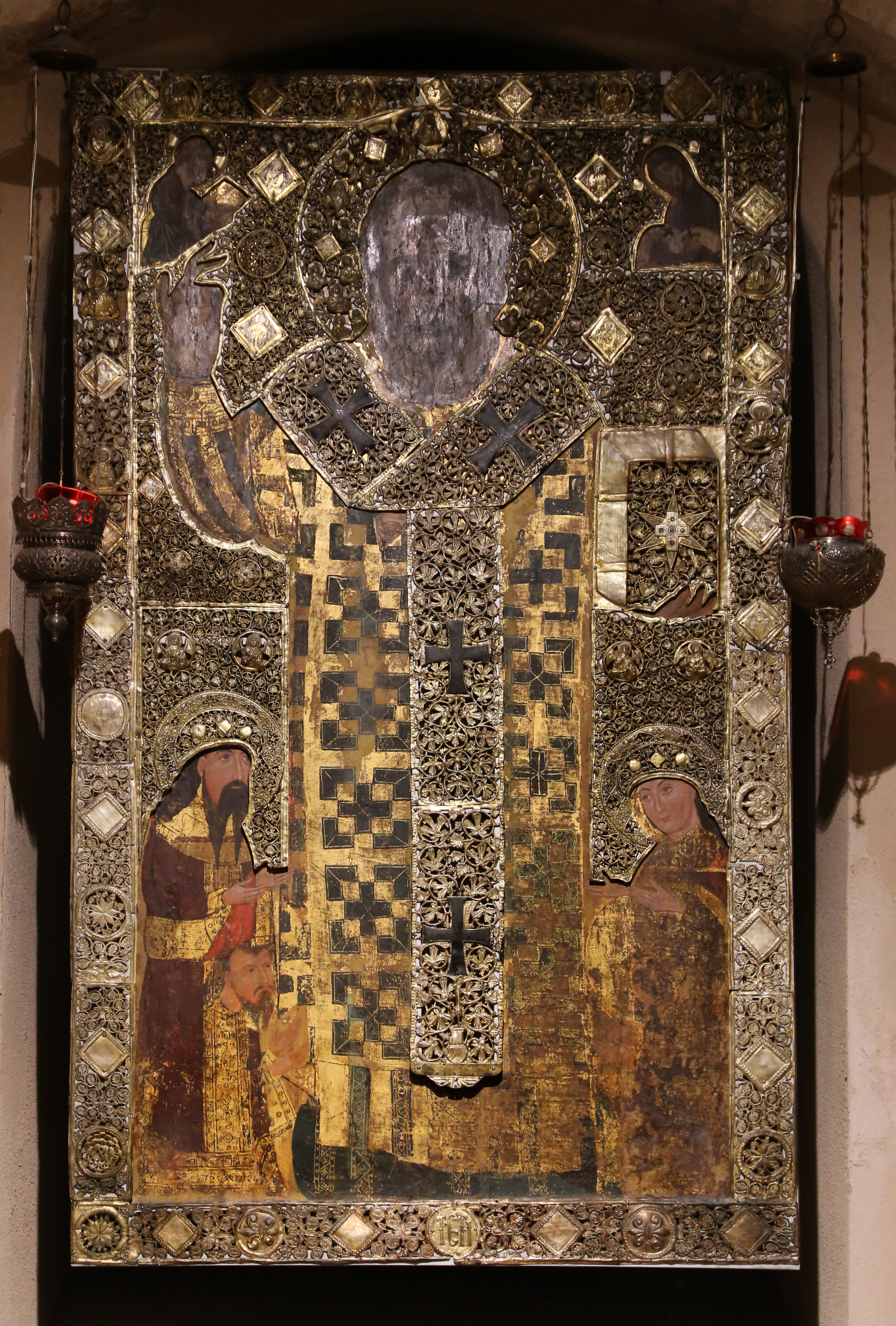
Stefan and Teodora portrayed as donors in an icon of Saint Nicholas, doned in 1319 to the tomb of the saint in Bari.

Teodora married Serbian crown prince (later king) Stefan Uroš III (called Dečanski) on 24 August 1296. They had two children: future Tsar (Emperor) Stefan Dušan and Dušica.

In 1314 her husband's father Stefan Milutin quarreled with Stefan, and sent him to Constantinople to be blinded. Teodora and the family went with him and established a household there until 1320 when they were allowed to return.

== Later life ==
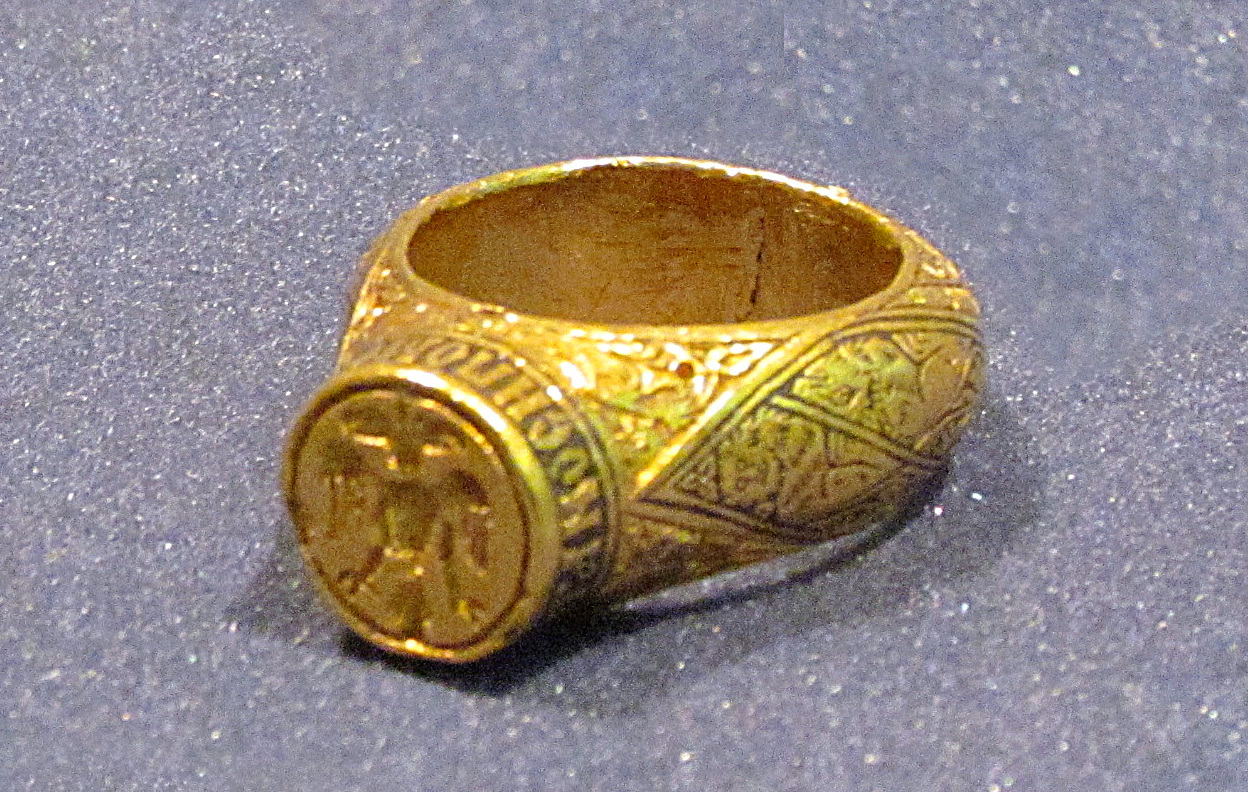
Ring of Queen Teodora, with an inscription: "May the Lord help the one who wears it!"

She was present at the state assembly of 6 January 1322, when her son Dušan was crowned Young king. In this period, Dečanski and Teodora were divorced. It is very likely that, between the death of Milutin (29 October 1321) and the crowning of Dušan, it was decided that Teodora be divorced from her husband due to the fact that Teodora's father's family had by then been expelled from Bulgaria, and Dečanski sought to empower himself by marrying into the Byzantine royal family. He then married Maria Palaiologina.

It is still unknown when Teodora died. She was alive on 6 January 1322, and according to M. Vukićević and S. Ćosović died prior to January 1323. Historian Stojan Novaković earlier based the death in the winter of 1322–23 on the talks of Dečanski marrying Phillip of Tarento in the beginning of 1323. Other believe she lived longer, possibly marrying Jovan Dragoslav between 1322 and 1326. It is believed she was buried in the Banjska monastery.

== Sources ==
- Ferjančić, Božidar (1960). Despoti u Vizantiji i Južnoslovenskim zemljama. Naučno Delo.
- Grujić. Kraljica Teodora mati Cara Dušana.

Royal titles
Preceded by Simonida	Queen consort of Serbia; 1321–1322	Succeeded by Maria Palaiologina
