= George I of Bulgaria =

Tsar of Bulgaria from 1280 to 1292

George Terter I
- Tsar of Bulgaria
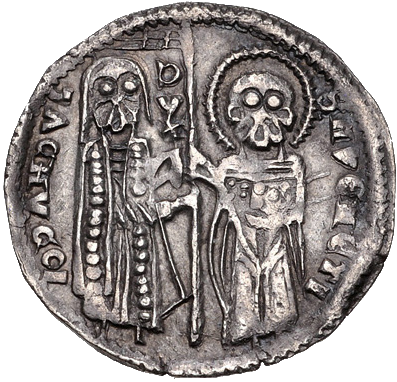
- Coin of George Terter I
- Reign: 1280–1292
- Predecessor: Ivan Asen III
- Successor: Smilets
- Died: 1308/1309
- Spouse: Maria Terter; Kira Maria (sister of Ivan Asen III)
- Issue: Theodore Svetoslav; Elena; Anna
- House: Terter

George Terter I (Bulgarian: Георги Тертер I), of the Terter dynasty, ruled as the tsar of Bulgaria from 1280 to 1292. He was born in Cherven. The date of his birth is unknown, and he died in 1308 or 1309.

== Early life ==
The antecedents of George Terter I are unclear, but the Byzantine sources testify that he was of Bulgarian and Cuman descent, something corroborated by his double name, which recalls the name of the Cuman clan Terteroba. George Terter I had at least one brother, named Aldimir (Eltimir), who was made a despot by either his older brother or by the regency for Ivan II.

When Ivan Asen III became emperor at Tărnovo in 1279 during the Uprising of Ivaylo, he sought to strengthen his position by allying himself with George Terter. The latter divorced his wife Maria, who was sent, together with their son, Theodore Svetoslav, as a hostage to the Byzantine Empire, in order for George to marry Kira Maria, sister of Ivan Asen III. George Terter was accordingly made a despot, the highest rank in the Byzantino-Bulgarian court hierarchy.

== Reign ==
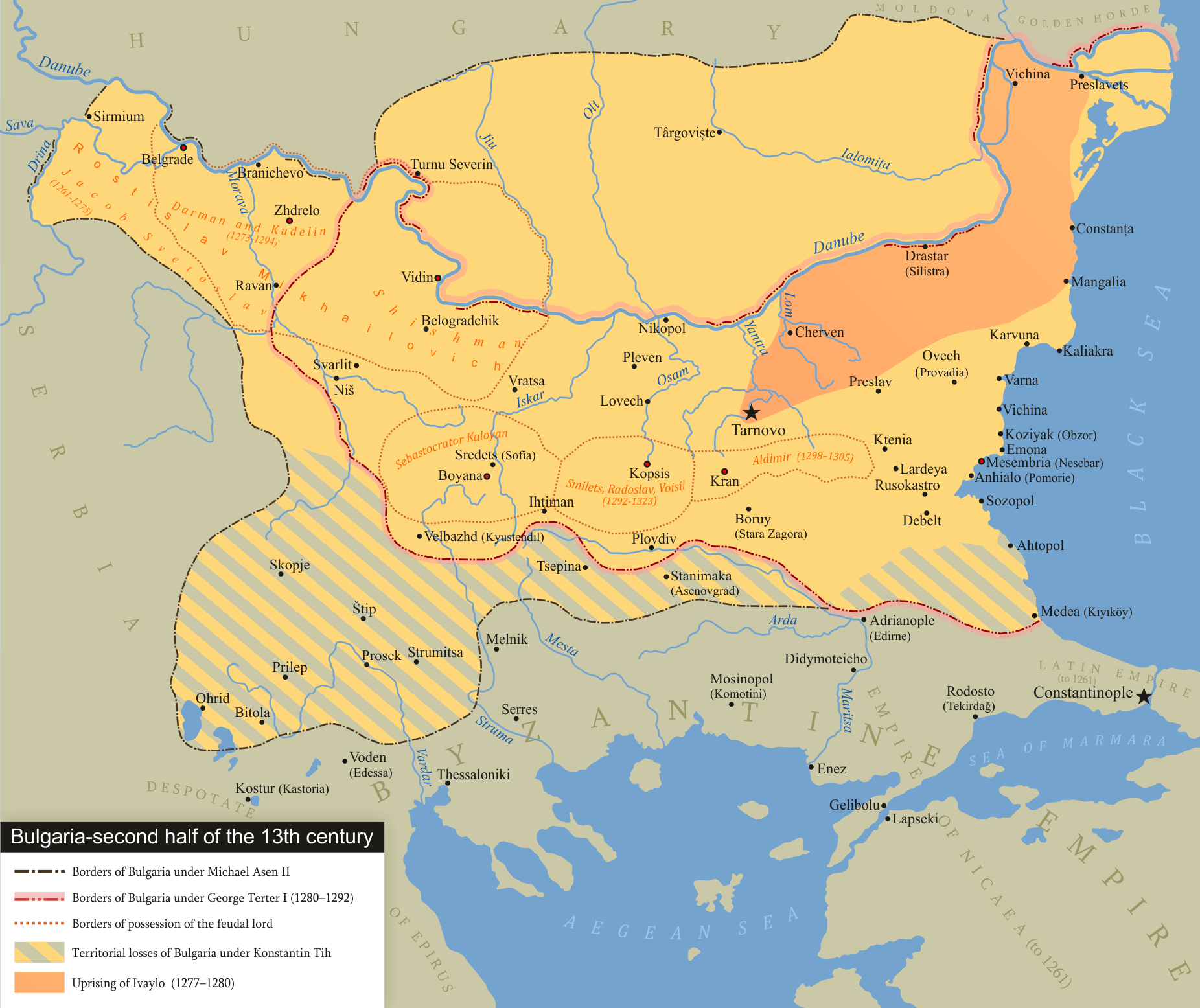
Bulgaria in the second half of the 13th century. The red line shows the Empire under George I Terter.

The continued success of Ivaylo against Byzantine reinforcements led Ivan Asen III to flee the capital and escape to the Byzantine Empire, while George Terter I seized power as emperor in 1280. With the threat from Ivaylo and Ivan Asen III removed, George Terter I made an alliance with King Charles I of Sicily, with Stefan Dragutin of Serbia, and with Thessaly against Michael VIII Palaeologus of the Byzantine Empire in 1281. The alliance failed as Charles was distracted by the Sicilian Vespers and the secession of Sicily in 1282, while Bulgaria was ravaged by the Mongols of the Golden Horde under Nogai Khan. Seeking Serbian support, George Terter I engaged his daughter Anna to the Serbian king Stefan Uroš II Milutin in 1284.

Since the death of the Byzantine Emperor Michael VIII Palaiologos in 1282, George Terter I re-opened negotiations with the Byzantine Empire and sought the return of his first wife. This was eventually accomplished by treaty, and the two Marias exchanged places as empress and hostage. Theodore Svetoslav also returned to Bulgaria after a successful mission of Patriarch Joachim III and was made co-emperor by his father, but after another Mongol invasion in 1285, he was sent off as a hostage to Nogai Khan. Theodore Svetoslav's other sister, Helena, was also sent to the Horde, where she married Nogai's son Chaka.

== Exile and death ==
The reasons for his exile are not very clear. According to George Pachymeres, after an attack by Nogai Khan on Bulgaria, George Terter was removed from the throne and then traveled to Adrianople. The Byzantine Emperor Andronikos II Palaiologos at first refused to receive him, perhaps fearing complications with the Mongols, and George Terter was kept waiting in wretched conditions in the vicinity of Adrianople. The former Bulgarian emperor was eventually sent to live in Anatolia. George Terter I passed the next decade of his life in obscurity. In 1301 his son Theodore Svetoslav, already emperor of Bulgaria, defeated a Byzantine army and captured thirteen high-ranking officers, whom he exchanged for his father.

In Bulgaria George Terter I was not associated in power by his son, but he was confined to luxurious life in a city chosen by his son. An inscription from a rock-cut church near Ivanovo laconically mentions the death of "emperor Gergi" in the year 1308/1309.

== Family ==
George Terter I was married twice. By his first wife, a Bulgarian named Maria, he had two children:

1. Theodore Svetoslav, emperor of Bulgaria 1300–1322
2. Elena, married to Chaka, tsar of Tarnovo 1299–1300.

By his second wife, Maria (Kira Maria) of Bulgaria, sister of Ivan Asen III, George Terter had one daughter:

1. Ana Terter, who married first Stefan Uroš II Milutin of Serbia, and then Demetrios Doukas Komnenos Koutroules.

== Sources ==
- John V. A. Fine, Jr., The Late Medieval Balkans, Ann Arbor, 1987.

Preceded by Ivan Asen III	Tsar of Bulgaria; 1280–1292	Succeeded by Smilets
