= Chaka of Bulgaria =

Tsar of Bulgaria from 1299 to 1300

Chaka
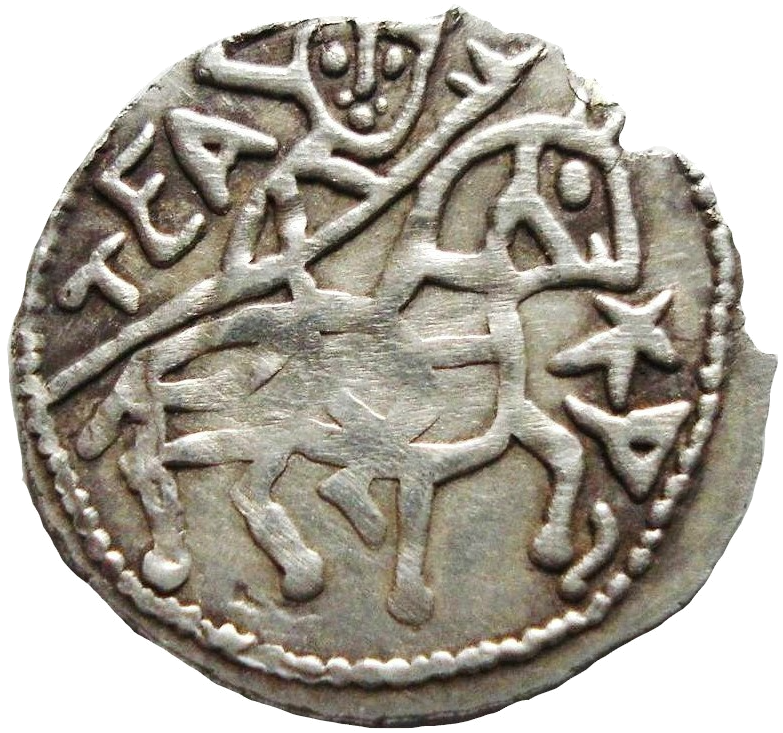
- Coin of Chaka, depicting him on horseback

Tsar of Bulgaria
- Reign: 1299–1300
- Predecessor: Ivan II
- Successor: Theodore Svetoslav
- Died: 1300; Tarnovo
- Spouse: Elena
- Issue: Kara-Kishek
- House: Borjigin
- Father: Nogai Khan
- Mother: Alaka
- Religion: unknown

Chaka (Bulgarian: Чака; died 1300) briefly reigned as tsar of Bulgaria, from 1299 to 1300. He was the son of the Mongol leader Nogai Khan by a wife named Alaka. Sometime after 1285 Chaka married a daughter of George Terter I of Bulgaria, named Elena. In the late 1290s, Chaka supported his father Nogai in a war against the legitimate khan of the Golden Horde, Toqta. Toqta defeated and killed Nogai in 1299.

== Reign ==
Chaka had led his supporters into Bulgaria, intimidated the regency for Ivan II into fleeing the capital, and imposed himself as ruler in Tărnovo in 1299. It is not completely certain whether he reigned as Emperor of Bulgaria or simply acted as the overlord of his brother-in-law Theodore Svetoslav. He is accepted as a ruler of Bulgaria by Bulgarian historiography.

Chaka did not long enjoy his new position of power, as the armies of Toqta followed him into Bulgaria and besieged Tărnovo. Theodore Svetoslav, who had been instrumental in Chaka's seizure of power, organized a plot in which Chaka was deposed and strangled in prison in 1300. His head was sent to Toqta, which in turn secured Theodore Svetoslav's position as the new emperor of Bulgaria. Theodore Svetoslav's cooperation contributed to the withdrawal of Mongol interference in Bulgaria.

== Family ==
It is not known if Chaka had children from Elena, the daughter of George I of Bulgaria. He had at least one son, Kara-Kishek, likely from a concubine. Kara-Kishek led a fragment of the Nogai Horde until sometime after 1301. After the death of Chaka, Kara Küçük fled the Horde with 3,000 Tatar horsemen and offered to take service with Shishman of Vidin.

Preceded by Ivan II	Tsar of Bulgaria; 1299–1300	Succeeded by Theodore Svetoslav
