= List of international official trips made by the patriarchs of All Bulgaria =

This is a list of official visits by the Patriarch of Bulgaria. The Patriarch of Bulgaria undertakes visits of behalf of the Bulgarian Orthodox Church.

== Cyril I (1953–1971) ==
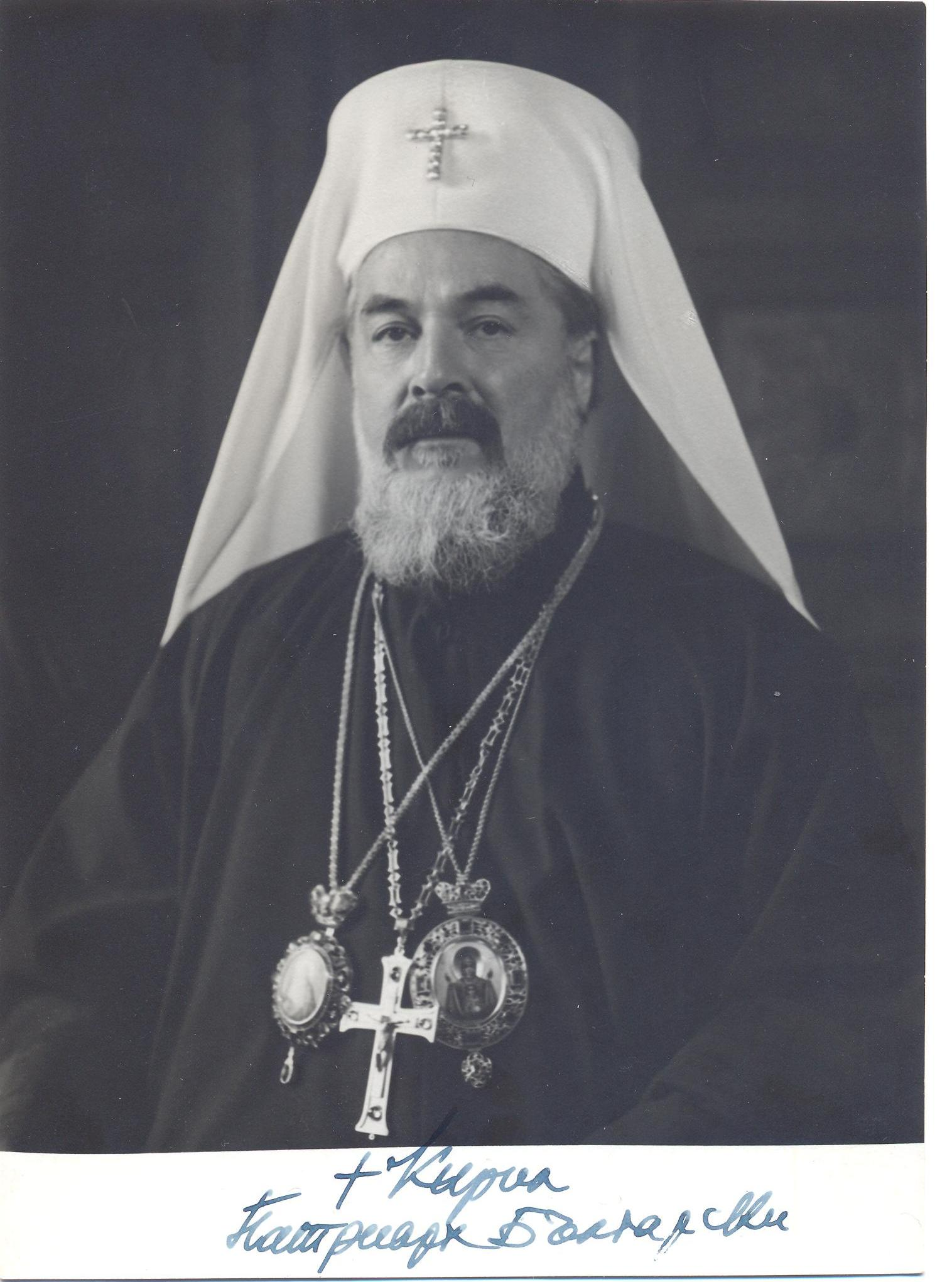
Patriarch Cyril I

Visits conducted by Patriarch Cyril:

- Turkey — 16–22 March 1962
- Syria — 1962
- Jordan — 1962
- Egypt — 1962
- Israel — 1962
- Greece — 16–20 April 1962
- Greece — 24–28 May 1963

== Maxim I (1971–2012) ==
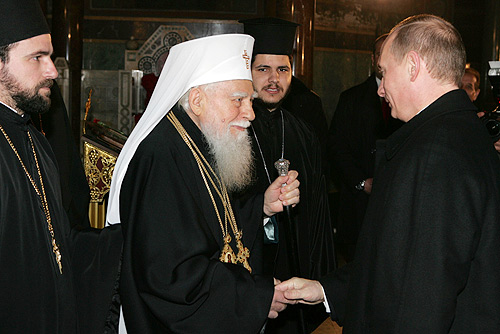
Patriarch Maxim and Russian President Vladimir Putin, Saint Alexander Nevsky Cathedral, Sofia, January 2008

Visits conducted by Patriarch Maxim:

- Turkey - 2-8 May 1973
- Greece — May–June 1975
- USA — 1 September–12 October 1978
- Serbia and Montenegro — 10–16 October 1995
- Russia — 17–22 August 2000

== Neophyte I (2013–2024) ==
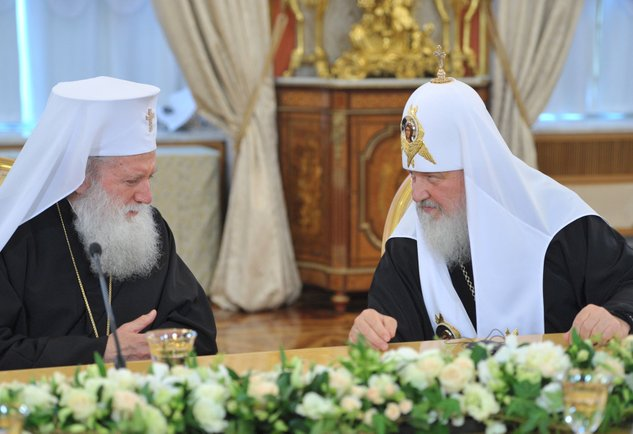
Patriarch Neophyte and Patriarch Kirill, Moscow, July 2013

Visits conducted by Patriarch Neophyte:

- Russia — 23–26 July 2013
- Ukraine — 26–30 July 2013
- Turkey — 20–23 September 2013
- Turkey — 5–9 March 2014
- Russia — 23–30 May 2014
- Russia — 7–11 March 2016
- Hungary — 10–11 May 2016
- Turkey — 7 January 2018
  - Istanbul — reopening of Saint Stephen Church with Ecumenical Patriarch Bartholomew I in the presence of Turkish President Recep Tayyip Erdoğan, Turkish Prime Minister Binali Yıldırım and Bulgarian Prime Minister Boyko Borisov
- Austria — 9–11 November 2019
  - Vienna — 50th Anniversary of the registration and state recognition of the Bulgarian Orthodox community “Saint John of Rila” by the Republic of Austria.

== Patriarch Daniel I (2024–) ==
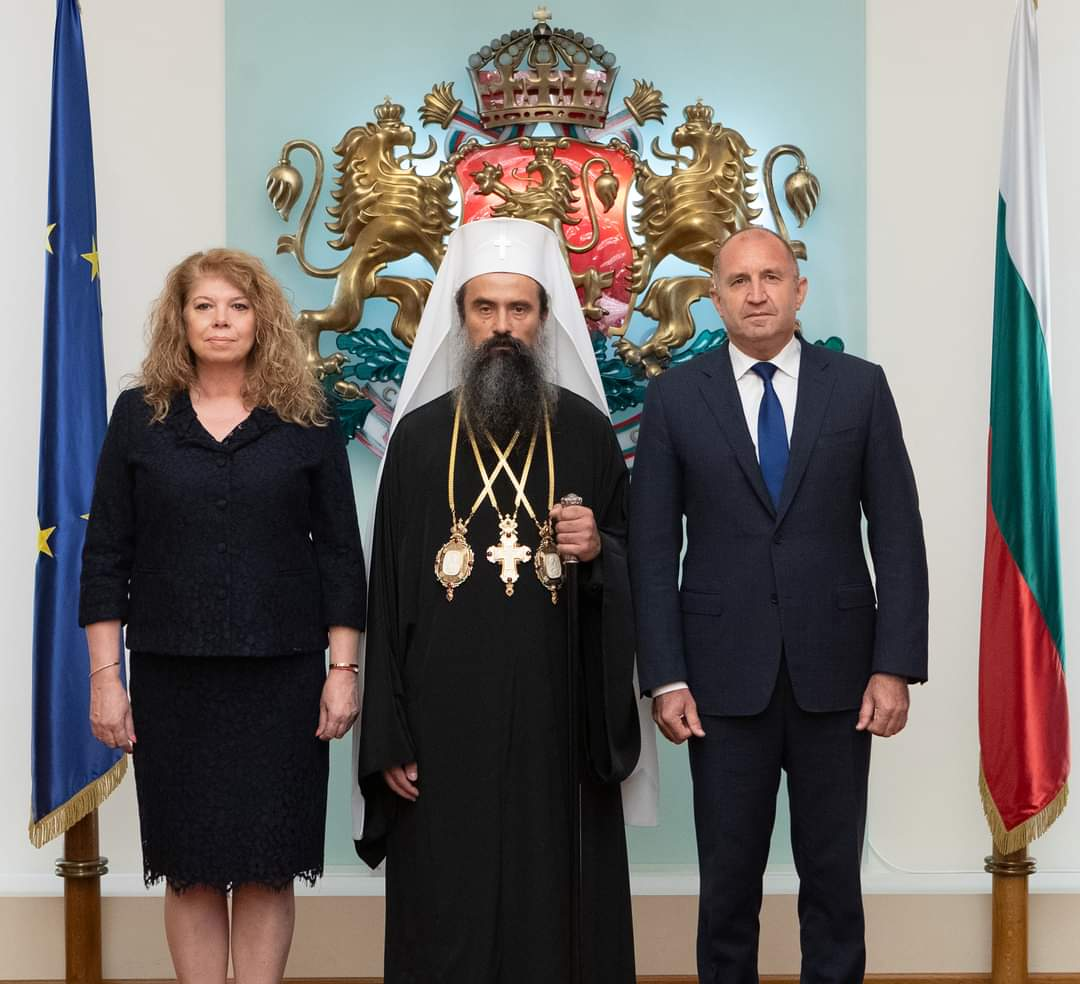
Patriarch Daniel and Bulgarian President Rumen Radev, Sofia, July 2024

Visits conducted by Patriarch Daniel so far include:

- Albania — 30 January 2025
  - Tirana – Funeral of Anastasios of Albania
- United Kingdom — 21–23 February 2025
  - London – consecration of Saint John of Rila Church in the presence of Boris, Prince of Tarnovo, Kyril, Prince of Preslav, former Prime Ministers of Bulgaria Marin Raykov and Nikolai Denkov and the Mayor of Westminster.
  - Maldon — visit to the Patriarchal Stavropegic Monastery of St John the Baptist
- Greece - 28-30 September 2025
  - Thessaloniki - II International Science Conference of “Theology” magazine
- Turkey - 25-28 December 2025
  - Fener, Istanbul - 26 December - service with The Patriarch of Constantinople at Saint George Church
  - Balat, Istanbul - 27 December - service at Saint Stephen Church
  - Yeşilköy, Istanbul - 28 December - service at Saint Stephen Church
- Georgia — 21-23 March 2026
  - Tbilisi – Funeral of Ilia II of Georgia
- Turkey - 9-12 June 2026
  - Imbros - celebrating the name day of Patriarch Bartholomew I of Constantinople together with Patriarch Daniel of Romania
- Israel - 25-27 September 2026
- Jerusalem - 25 September - official welcome at Jaffa Gate, procession to and prayer service at Church of the Holy Sepulchre, and bestowing Order of the Holy Sepulchre (Orthodox) by Patriarch Theophilos III of Jerusalem
- Jerusalem - 26 September - visit to Mount of Olives, Holy Monastery of the Ascension, Church of Mary Magdalene and Abbey of the Dormition
- Bethlehem - 26 September - visit to Church of the Nativity and Mar Saba
- Jerusalem - 27 September - Divine Liturgy by Daniil of Bulgaria and Patriarch Theophilos III of Jerusalem at Church of the Holy Sepulchre and Litany procession with True Cross to Calvary
- Jordan - 28-30 September 2026
- Al-Maghtas - 28 September - welcome of Daniil of Bulgaria and Patriarch Theophilos III of Jerusalem by Prince Ghazi bin Muhammad. Visit to the Cave of Saint John the Baptist, Hill of the Prophet Elijah, Saint John the Baptist Church, Jordan River and Baptism Site International Orthodox University
- Madaba - 28 September - visit to Saint George Church and its Orthodox school with Patriarch Theophilos III of Jerusalem
- Amman - 29 September - audience with Abdullah II of Jordan attended by Prince Ghazi bin Muhammad, visit to Church of the Asencion, Saint Nektarios Church and Saint Ignatius Center with Patriarch Theophilos III of Jerusalem
- Fuheis - 29 September - visit Saint George Church with Patriarch Theophilos III of Jerusalem
- Greece - 21-24 October 2026
- Mount Athos - 21 October - Karyes, Mount Athos, Monastery of Iviron, Holy Cell of Saint Nicholas "Burazeri" and Zograf Monastery
- Mount Athos - 22 October - Vatopedi
