= Cyril I =

Cyril I may refer to:

- Cyril of Alexandria, Patriarch of Alexandria in 412–444
- Cyril I of Constantinople, Ecumenical Patriarch in 1612, 1620–23, 1623–33, 1633–34, 1634–35 and 1637–38
- Cyril of Bulgaria, Patriarch in 1953–1971
- Cyril I of Moscow and All Russia, since 2009
