= List of patriarchs of the Bulgarian Orthodox Church =

The following is a list of patriarchs of All Bulgaria, heads of the Bulgarian Orthodox Church. The Bulgarian Orthodox Church was recognized as an autocephalous archbishopric in 870. In 918 or 919 the Bulgarian monarch Simeon I (r. 893–927) summoned a church council to raise the Bulgarian Archbishopric to a completely independent patriarchate. With the Byzantine–Bulgarian Treaty of 927, which affirmed the victory of the First Bulgarian Empire over the Byzantine Empire in the War of 913–927, the Ecumenical Patriarch of Constantinople recognized the Bulgarian Patriarchate.

== List ==
| Title | Primate | Portrait | Birth name | Reign | Seat |
|---|---|---|---|---|---|
Archbishops of Bulgaria (870–918)
| Archbishop | Joseph | | | 870–c. 877 | Drastar/Pliska |
| Archbishop | George | | | c. 877–c. 893 | Drastar/Pliska |
| Archbishop | Gregory Presbyter; John the Exarch (?) | | | c. 893–s. 917 | Drastar/Preslav |
| Archbishop | Leontius | | | c. 917–c. 918/919 | Preslav |
Patriarchs of Bulgaria (918/919–1018)
| Patriarch uncanonical; not recognized by the Ecumenical Patriarch of Constantinople | Leontius | | | c. 918/919–927 | Preslav |
| Patriarch canonical; recognized by the Ecumenical Patriarch of Constantinople | Demetrius | | | c. 927–c. 930 | Drastar/Preslav |
| Patriarch | Sergius | | | c. 931–c. 940 | Drastar/Preslav |
| Patriarch | Gregory | | | c. 940–c. 944 | Drastar/Preslav |
| Patriarch | Damian | | | c. 944–c. 972 | Preslav/Drastar, Sredets |
| Patriarch | Germanus | | | c. 972–c. 990 | Sredets, Voden, Moglena, Prespa |
| Patriarch | Nicolaus | | | c. 991–c. 1000 | Prespa (?) |
| Patriarch | Philip | | | c. 1000–c. 1015 | Ohrid |
| Patriarch | David | | John of Debar | c. 1015–1018 | Ohrid |
After the fall of the First Bulgarian Empire under Byzantine domination in 1018 the Church was deprived of its patriarchal title and reduced to the rank of an autocephalous Archbishopric of Ohrid; in 1767 it was put under the tutelage of the Ecumenical Patriarch of Constantinople. A separate Bulgarian Church was created with the establishment of the Second Bulgarian Empire in 1186.
Archbishops of Bulgaria (1186–1235)
| Primate title was canonically recognized by Pope Innocent III in 1204 | Basil I | | | 1186–1232 | Tarnovo |
| Primate | Saint Joachim I | | | 1232–1246 | Tarnovo |
Patriarchs of Bulgaria (1235–1394)
| Patriarch title was canonically recognized by the Eastern Orthodox Patriarchs in 1235 | Saint Joachim I | | | 1235–1246 | Tarnovo |
| Patriarch | Vissarion | | | c. 1246 | Tarnovo |
| Patriarch | Basil II | | | 1246–c. 1254 | Tarnovo |
| Patriarch | Basil III | | | c. 1254–1263 | Tarnovo |
| Patriarch | Joachim II | | | 1263–1272 | Tarnovo |
| Patriarch | Ignatius | | | 1272–1277 | Tarnovo |
| Patriarch | Saint Macarius | | | 1277–1284 | Tarnovo |
| Patriarch | Joachim III | | | 1284–1300 | Tarnovo |
| Patriarch | Dorotheus | | | 1300–c. 1315 | Tarnovo |
| Patriarch | Romanus | | | c. 1315–c. 1325 | Tarnovo |
| Patriarch | Theodosius I | | | c. 1325–1337 | Tarnovo |
| Patriarch | Joannicius I | | | 1337–c. 1340 | Tarnovo |
| Patriarch | Symeon | | | c. 1341–1348 | Tarnovo |
| Patriarch | Theodosius II | | | 1348–1363 | Tarnovo |
| Patriarch | Joannicius II | | | 1363–1375 | Tarnovo |
| Patriarch | Saint Euthymius | | | 1375–1394 | Tarnovo |
Exarchs of the Bulgarians (1872–1915)
| Exarch title was granted by a decree (firman) of Sultan Abdulaziz, promulgated on 28 February 1870. Unrecognized by the Ecumenical Patriarch of Constantinople | Hilarion | | Ivan Ivanov | 12 February 1872 – 16 February 1872 | Constantinople, Ottoman Empire |
| Exarch | Anthim I | | Atanas Mihaylov Chalakov | 16 February 1872 – 14 April 1877 | Constantinople, Ottoman Empire |
| Exarch | Joseph I | | Lazar Yovchev | 24 April 1877 – 20 June 1915 | Constantinople, Ottoman Empire |
| Exarch | Joseph I | | Lazar Yovchev | 24 April 1877 – 20 June 1915 | Sofia, Bulgaria |
Vicars – Chairmen of the Holy Synod (1915–1945)
| Metropolitan | Parthenius | | Petar Popstefanov Ivanov Popov | 1915 – 20 June 1918 | Sofia |
| Metropolitan | Vasilius | | Vasil Mihaiylov | June 1918 – 22 October 1921 | Sofia |
| Metropolitan | Maxim | | Marin Penchov Pelov | 22 October 1921 – 28 March 1928 | Sofia |
| Metropolitan | Clement | | Grigoriy Ivanov Shivachev | 28 March 1928 – 3 May 1930 | Sofia |
| Metropolitan | Neophyte | | Nikola Dimitrov Karaabov | 4 May 1930 – 15 October 1944 | Sofia |
| Metropolitan | Stefan I | | Stoyan Popgeorgiev Shokov | 16 October 1944 – 21 January 1945 | Sofia |
Exarch of the Bulgarians (1945–1948)
| Exarch canonical; recognized by the Ecumenical Patriarch of Constantinople | Stefan I | | Stoyan Popgeorgiev Shokov | 21 January 1945 – 6 September 1948 | Sofia |
Vicars – Chairmen of the Holy Synod (1948–1953)
| Metropolitan | Michael | | Dimitar Todorov Chavdarov | 8 November 1948 – 4 January 1949 | Sofia |
| Metropolitan | Paisius | | Alexandar Raykov Ankov | 4 January 1949 – 3 January 1951 | Sofia |
| Metropolitan | Cyril | | Konstantin Markov Konstantinov | 3 January 1951 – 10 May 1953 | Sofia |
Patriarchs of Bulgaria (1953–present)
| Patriarch title was recognized by the Ecumenical Patriarch of Constantinople | Cyril | | Konstantin Markov Konstantinov | 10 May 1953 – 7 March 1971 | Sofia |
| Patriarch | Maxim | | Marin Naydenov Minkov | 4 July 1971 – 6 November 2012 | Sofia |
| Patriarch | Neophyte | | Simeon Nikolov Dimitrov | 24 February 2013 – 13 March 2024 | Sofia |
| Patriarch | Daniil | | Atanas Trendafilov Nikolov | 30 June 2024 – present | Sofia |

== Timeline since 1953 ==
This is a graphical timeline of the patriarchs of the Bulgarian Orthodox Church since 1953. They are listed in order of first assuming office.

The following chart lists the patriarchs by lifespan, with the years outside of their tenure in blue.

== See also ==
- List of international official trips made by the patriarchs of All Bulgaria

== Sources ==
- Златарски (Zlatarski), Васил (Vasil) (1972) [1927]. История на българската държава през средните векове. Том I. История на Първото българско царство. (History of the Bulgarian state in the Middle Ages. Volume I. History of the First Bulgarian Empire.) (in Bulgarian) (2 ed.). София (Sofia): Наука и изкуство (Nauka i izkustvo). OCLC 67080314.
