= Germanus I =

Germanus I may refer to:

- Germanus I, Patriarch of Bulgaria c. 972 – c. 990
- Germanus I of Constantinople, Ecumenical Patriarch in 715–730
