= Patriarch of Bulgaria =

Head of the Bulgarian Orthodox Church

- Archbishopric

Eastern Orthodox
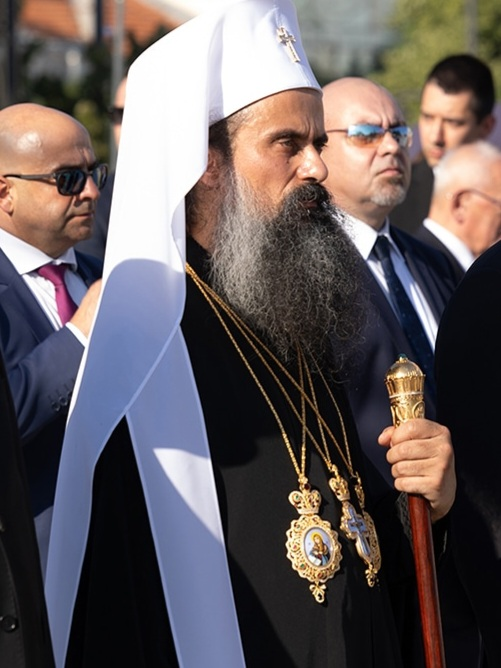
- Incumbent; Daniel since 30 June 2024
- Style: His Holiness

Information
- First holder: Leontius (Medieval); Cyril (Modern)
- Established: 918/919 (Medieval); 1953 (Modern)

Website
- bg-patriarshia.bg

The Patriarch of Bulgaria (Bulgarian: Патриарх Български) is the patriarch of the Bulgarian Orthodox Church. The patriarch is officially styled as Patriarch of All Bulgaria and Metropolitan of Sofia. The current patriarch Daniil acceded to this position on 30 June 2024.

== History ==
=== Medieval era ===
Following two decisive victories over the Byzantines at Achelous (near the present-day city of Burgas) and Katasyrtai (near Constantinople), the autonomous Bulgarian archbishopric was proclaimed autocephalous and elevated to the rank of patriarchate at an ecclesiastical and national council held in 918 or 919. As a result of the Treaty of 927, which affirmed the Bulgarian victory in the Byzantine–Bulgarian war of 913–927, the Patriarchate of Constantinople recognized the autocephalous status of the Bulgarian Orthodox Church and acknowledged its patriarchal dignity. Demetrius of Bulgaria was the second patriarch of the Bulgarian Orthodox Church and the first one to have been recognized by the Ecumenical Patriarch of Constantinople Thus, the Bulgarian Patriarchate became the first national patriarchate in Europe, and the sixth autocephalous patriarchate after the five forming the Pentarchy – those of Rome, Antioch, Alexandria, Jerusalem, and Constantinople. The seat of the patriarchate was the new Bulgarian capital of Preslav although the patriarch is likely to have resided in the town of Drastar (Silistra), an old Christian centre famous for its martyrs and Christian traditions.

In 990 the seat of the patriarchy moved to Ohrid after the conquest of large parts of Bulgaria by the Byzantines. Following the destruction of the First Bulgarian Empire in 1018, the patriarchate was downgraded to an archbishopric. In 1186 a new archbishopric was established at Tarnovo by the Second Bulgarian Empire, and it was formally recognised as a patriarchate by the others in 1235.

=== Ottoman conquest ===
After the fall of the capital of the Second Bulgarian Empire, Tarnovo, to the Ottomans in 1393 and the exile of Patriarch Euthymius, the autocephalous Bulgarian Church was destroyed. The Bulgarian diocese was again subordinated to the Patriarchate of Constantinople.

=== Modern era ===
Conditions for the restoration of the Bulgarian Patriarchate were created after World War II. In 1945 the Patriarch of Constantinople recognised the autocephaly of the Bulgarian Church. In 1950, the Holy Synod adopted a new statute which paved the way for the restoration of the patriarchate and in 1953, it elected the metropolitan of Plovdiv, Cyril, Bulgarian patriarch. After the death of Patriarch Cyril in 1971, the Church elected in his place Maxim, the metropolitan of Lovech, who was the Bulgarian patriarch until his death in 2012. For an interim leader on 10 November 2012 was chosen Metropolitan Cyril of Varna and Veliki Preslav, who organized the election of a new patriarch. On 24 February 2013 Neophyte of Bulgaria was elected as the new patriarch. Patriarch Neophyte died on 13 March 2024.

== See also ==
- List of patriarchs of the Bulgarian Orthodox Church
- List of international official trips made by the patriarchs of All Bulgaria
