= Bulgarian Orthodox Church =

Autocephalous jurisdiction of the Eastern Orthodox Church

Patriarchate of Bulgaria
- Българска патриаршия (Bulgarian)
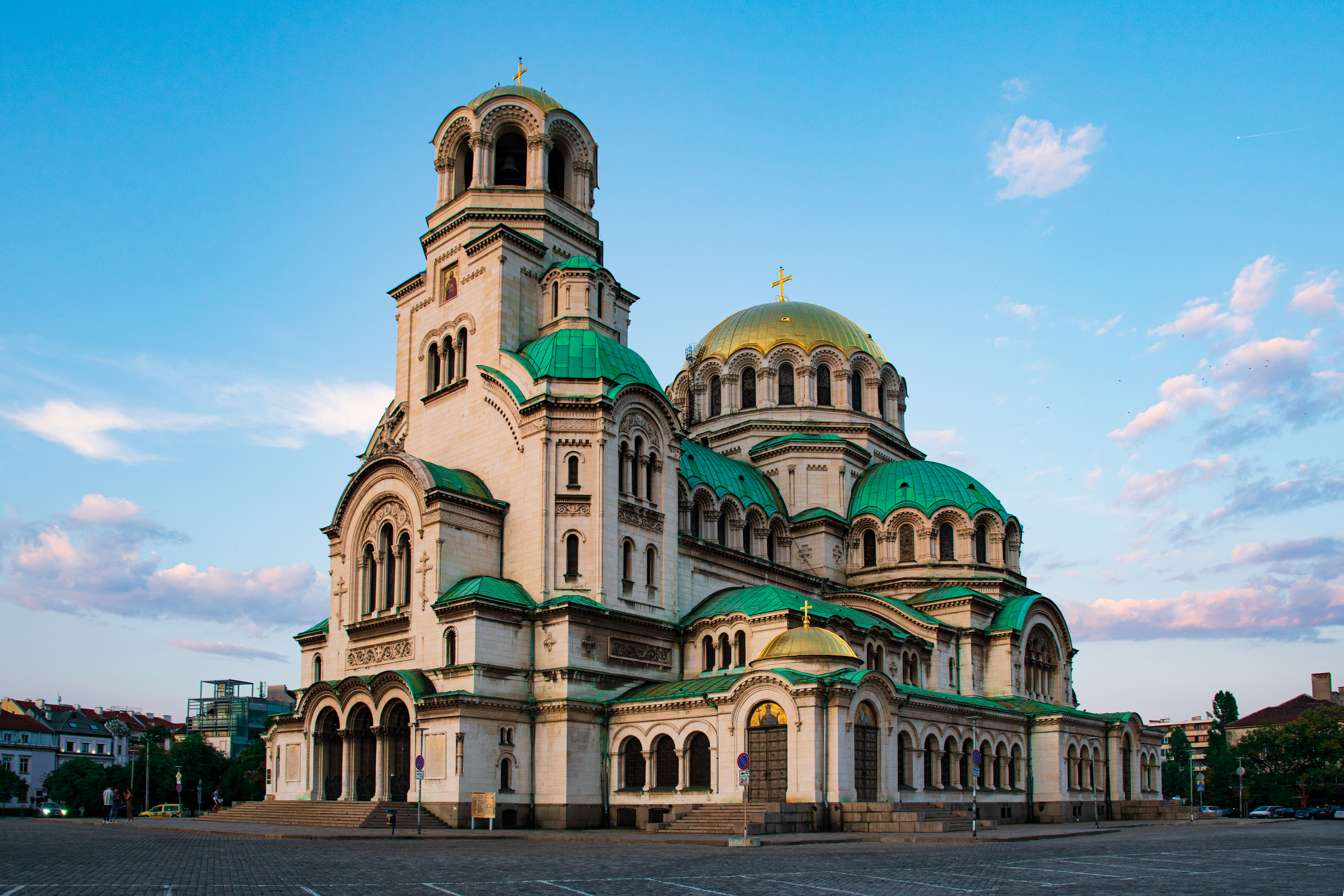
- Saint Alexander Nevsky Cathedral, Sofia
- Type: Autocephaly
- Classification: Christian
- Orientation: Eastern Orthodox
- Scripture: Septuagint; New Testament
- Theology: Eastern Orthodox theology
- Primate: Daniil
- Bishops: 15
- Priests: 2,000
- Parishes: 2,600
- Monasteries: 120
- Language: Bulgarian and Old Church Slavonic (Old Bulgarian)
- Liturgy: Byzantine Rite
- Headquarters: Saint Alexander Nevsky Cathedral, Sofia, Bulgaria
- Territory: Bulgaria
- Possessions: United States, Canada, Australia, European Union, Argentina, Russia, Greece, Turkey
- Founder: Boris I of Bulgaria (original); Anthim I (as Bulgarian Exarchate); Stefan I of Bulgaria (modern incarnation)
- Independence: 919 (abolished in 1018) re-established in 1185 (abolished in 1393) re-established again in 1870
- Recognition: 870 (Autonomy); 927 (Patriarchate); 1235 (Patriarchate); 1945 (Autocephaly); 1953 (Patriarchate)
- Separated from: Ecumenical Patriarchate of Constantinople
- Separations: Old Calendar Bulgarian Orthodox Church (late 1980s); Bulgarian Orthodox Church – Alternative synod (1996–2013)
- Members: 7–8 million
- Official website: www.bg-patriarshia.bg

The Bulgarian Orthodox Church (Bulgarian: Българска православна църква, romanized: Bûlgarska pravoslavna cûrkva), legally the Patriarchate of Bulgaria (Bulgarian: Българска патриаршия, romanized: Bûlgarska patriarshiya), is an autocephalous Eastern Orthodox church in full communion with the other Eastern Orthodox churches. It is the first medieval recognised patriarchate outside the Pentarchy and the oldest Slavic Orthodox church, with some 6 million members in Bulgaria and between 1.5 and 2 million members in a number of other European countries, Asia, the Americas, Australia, and New Zealand. It was recognized as autocephalous in 1945 by the Ecumenical Patriarchate of Constantinople.

== History ==
=== Early Christianity ===
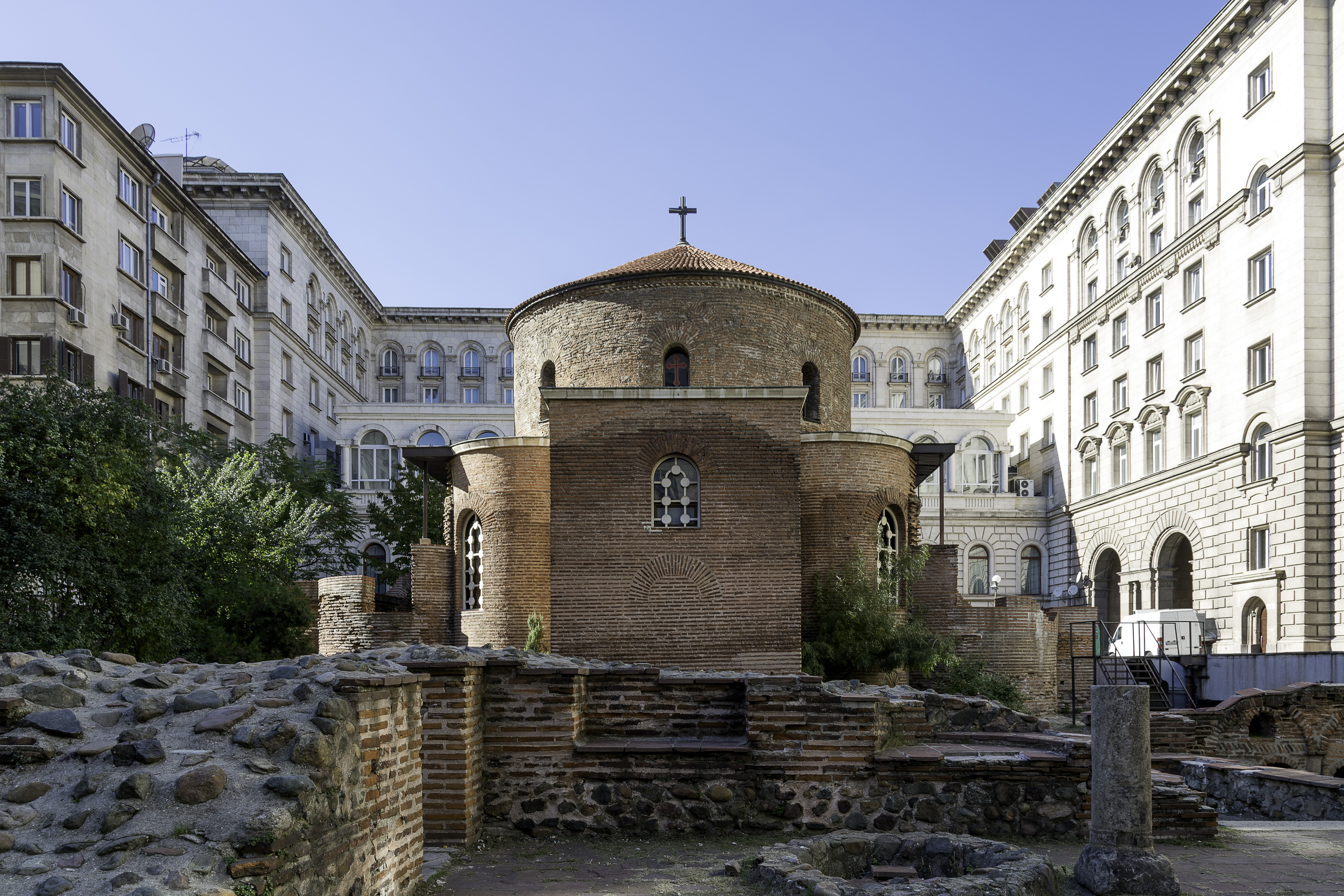
St. George Rotunda Church (4th century), Sofia

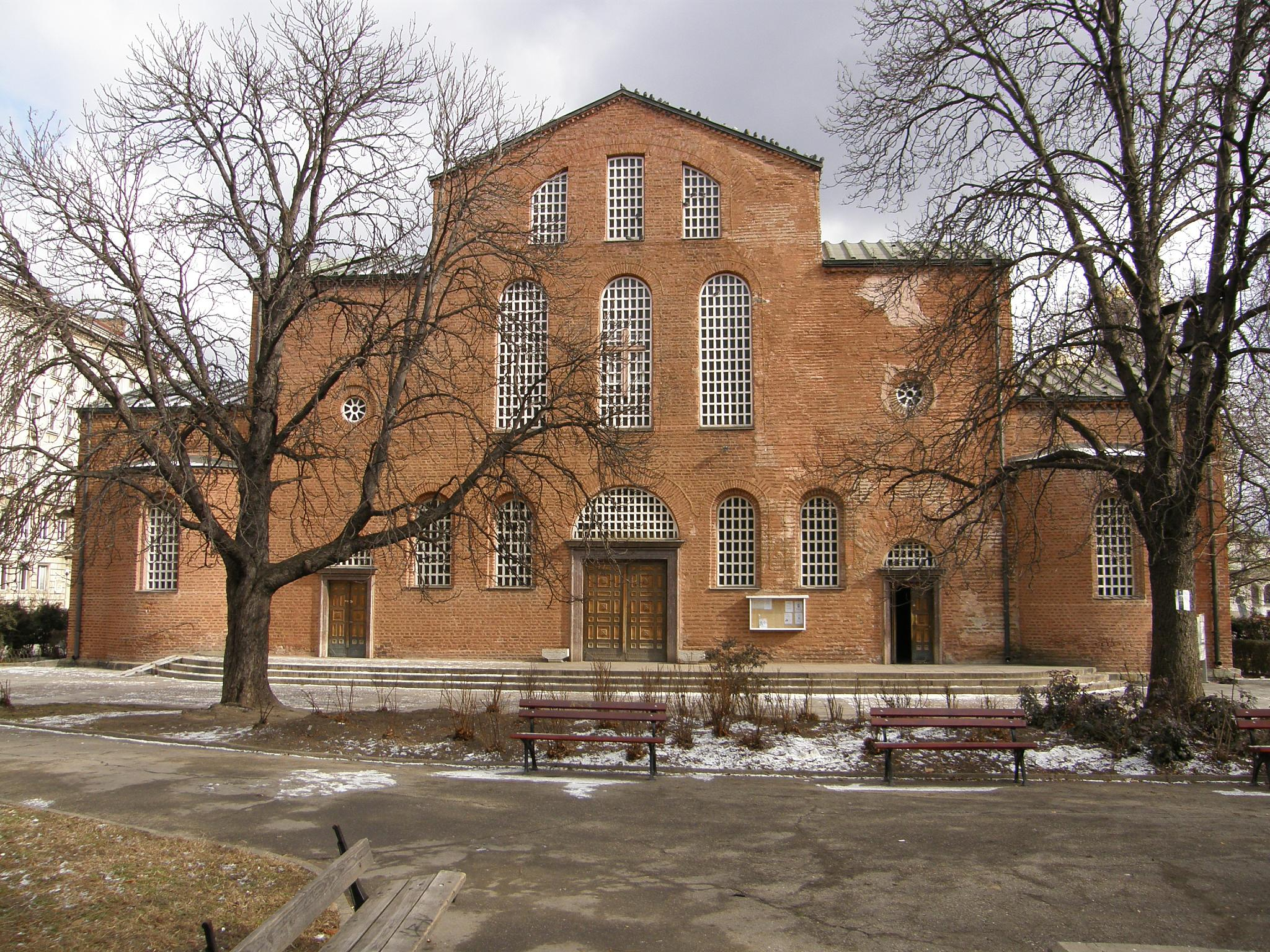
Saint Sophia Basilica (6th century), Sofia

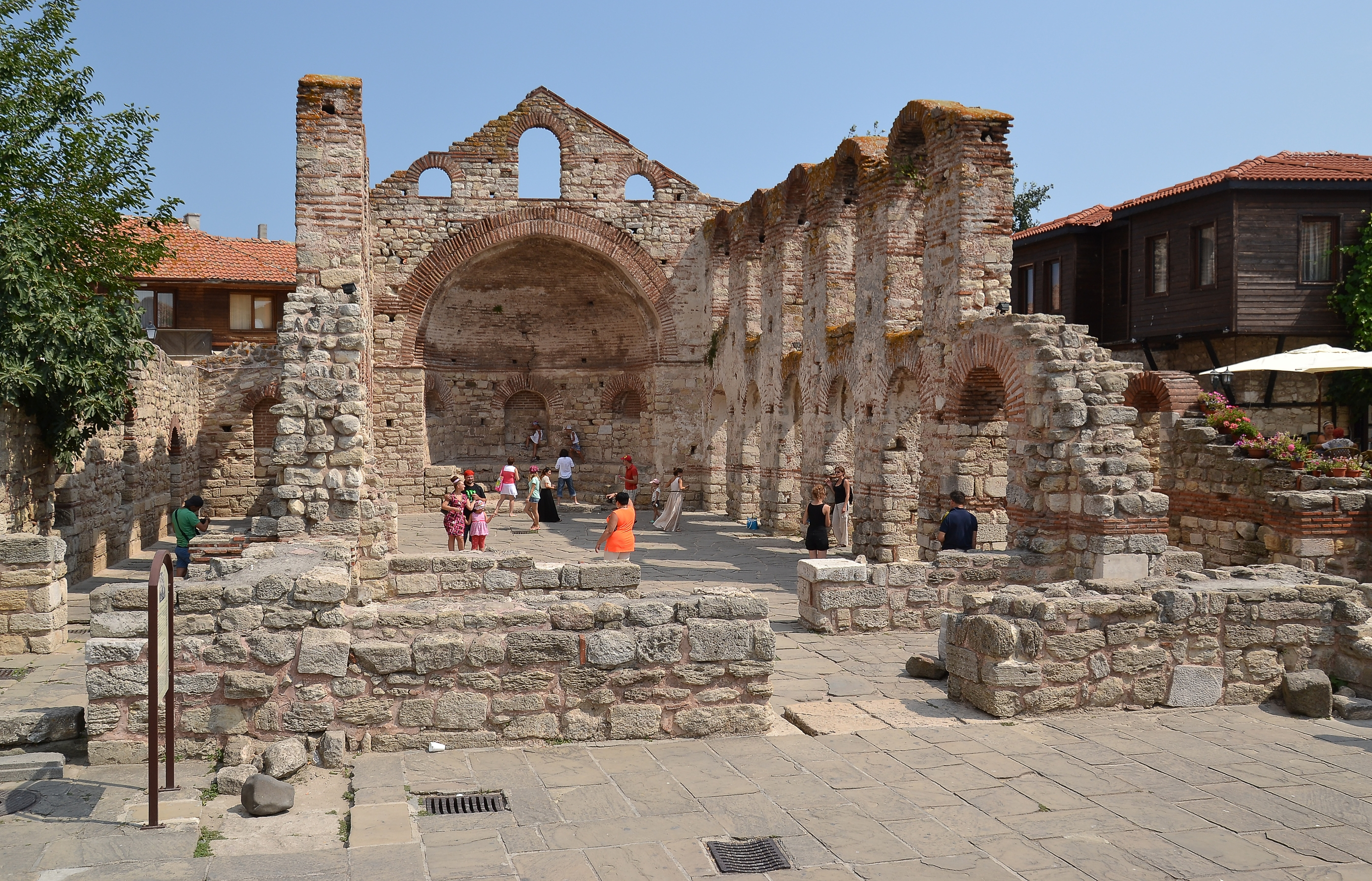
Saint Sophia Basilica (5th–6th century), Nesebar

The Bulgarian Orthodox Church has its origin in the flourishing Christian communities and churches established in Southeast Europe as early as the first centuries of the Christian era. Christianity was brought to the Thracian lands by the apostles Paul and Andrew in the 1st century AD, when the first organised Christian communities were formed. By the beginning of the 4th century, Christianity had become the dominant religion in the region. Towns such as Serdica (Sofia), Philipopolis (Plovdiv), Odessus (Varna), Dorostorum (Silistra), and Adrianople (Edirne) were significant centres of Christianity in the Roman Empire.

The Monastery of Saint Athanasius, the first Christian monastery in Europe, was founded in Thrace in 344 by Saint Athanasius near modern-day Chirpan, Bulgaria, following the Council of Serdica and the Edict of Serdica.

The raids and incursions into the Roman provinces in the 4th and 5th centuries brought considerable damage to the ecclesiastical organisation of the Christian Church in the Bulgarian lands, yet did not destroy it. Kubrat and Organa were both baptized together in Constantinople, and from the surviving Christian communities, Christianity made inroads with local Bulgar-Slavic people. By the middle of the 9th century, the majority of the early Slavs, especially those living in Thrace and Macedonia under Eastern Roman rule, were Christianized. The Christian religion also enjoyed some success among the Bulgar nobility, with recorded conversions among that group. However, it was not until the official adoption of Christianity by the First Bulgarian Empire during the reign of Boris I in 865 that an independent Bulgarian ecclesiastical entity was established.

=== Establishment ===
Boris I believed that cultural advancement, sovereignty, and the prestige of a Christian Bulgaria could be achieved through an enlightened clergy governed by an autocephalous church. To this end, he manoeuvred between the Patriarch of Constantinople and the Roman Pope for a period of five years until, in 870 AD, the Fourth Council of Constantinople granted the Bulgarians an autonomous Bulgarian archbishopric. The archbishopric had its seat in the Bulgarian capital of Pliska, and its diocese covered the whole territory of the Bulgarian state.

The tug-of-war between Rome and Constantinople was resolved by placing the Bulgarian archbishopric under the jurisdiction of the Patriarch of Constantinople, from whom it obtained its first primate, its clergy, and theological books. Although the archbishopric enjoyed full internal autonomy, the goals of Boris I were scarcely fulfilled. A Greek liturgy offered by a Byzantine clergy furthered neither the cultural development of the Bulgarians nor the consolidation of the Bulgarian Empire; it would have eventually resulted in the loss of both the identity of the people and the statehood of Bulgaria.

Following the Byzantine theory of "Imperium sine Patriarcha non staret", which stated that a close relation should exist between an empire and patriarchate, Boris I greeted the arrival of the disciples of the recently deceased Saints Cyril and Methodius in 886 as an opportunity. Boris I tasked them with the instruction of the future Bulgarian clergy in the Glagolitic alphabet and the Slavonic liturgy prepared by Cyril. The liturgy was based on the vernacular of the early Slavs from the region of Thessaloniki. In 893, Boris I expelled the Greek clergy from the country and ordered the Greek language to be replaced with the Slav-Bulgarian vernacular.

=== Autocephaly and Patriarchate ===
Following Bulgaria's two decisive victories over the Byzantines at Acheloos (near the present-day city of Pomorie) and Katasyrtai (near Constantinople), the government declared the autonomous Bulgarian Archbishopric as autocephalous and elevated it to the rank of patriarchate at an ecclesiastical and national council held in 919. After Bulgaria and the Byzantine Empire signed a peace treaty in 927 that concluded the 20-year-long war between them, the patriarchate of Constantinople recognised the autocephalous status of the Bulgarian Orthodox Church and acknowledged its patriarchal dignity.

The Bulgarian Patriarchate was the first autocephalous Slavic Orthodox Church, preceding the autocephaly of the Serbian Orthodox Church (1219) by 292 years and of the Russian Orthodox Church (1596) by 662 years. It was the sixth patriarchate after the Pentarchy patriarchates of Rome, Constantinople, Alexandria, Antioch, and Jerusalem. The seat of the patriarchate was the new Bulgarian capital of Preslav. The patriarch was likely to have resided in the town of Drastar (Silistra), an old Christian centre noted for its martyrs and Christian traditions.

=== Ohrid Archbishopric ===
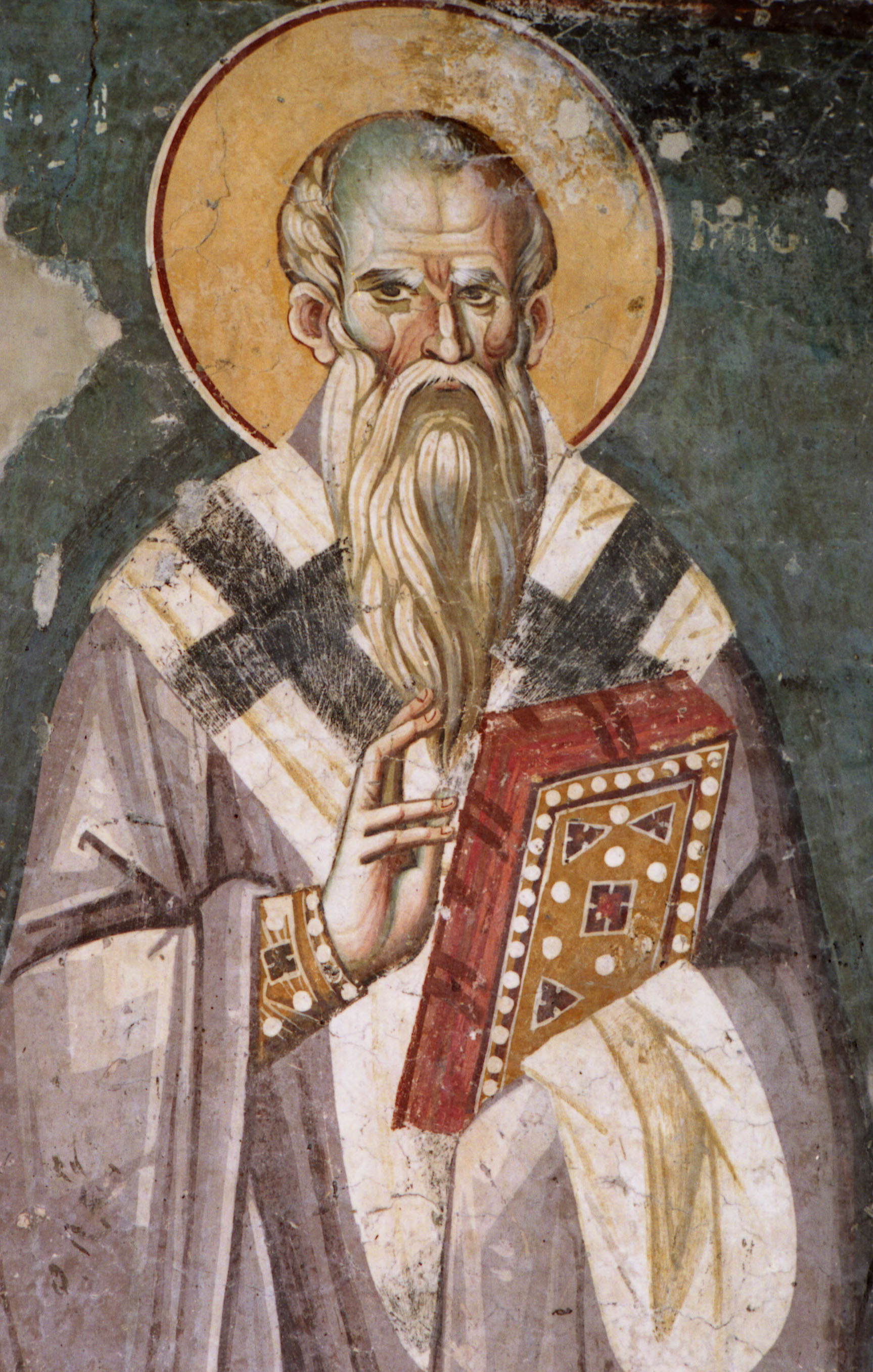
A medieval fresco of Saint Clement of Ohrid, a high-ranking official of the Bulgarian Church, scholar, writer, and enlightener of the Bulgarians and the Slavs

On April 5, 972, Byzantine Emperor John I Tzimisces conquered and burned down Preslav, and captured Bulgarian Tsar Boris II. Patriarch Damyan managed to escape, initially to Sredetz (Sofia) in western Bulgaria. In the coming years, the residence of the Bulgarian patriarchs remained closely connected to the developments in the war between the next Bulgarian royal dynasty, the Comitopuli, and the Byzantine Empire. Patriarch Germanus resided consecutively in the medieval Bulgarian cities of Maglen (Almopia) and Voden (Edessa) (both in present-day north-western Greece), and Prespa (in present-day southern North Macedonia). Around 990, the next patriarch, Philip, moved to Ohrid (in present-day south-western North Macedonia), which became the permanent seat of the patriarchate.

After the complete defeat of Bulgaria in 1018, Emperor Basil II Bulgaroktonos ("Bulgar-Slayer") abolished the autocephaly of the Bulgarian Orthodox Church and reduced it to the rank of an archbishopric, with its seat in Ohrid. Through special charters (imperial decrees), his government defined its boundaries, dioceses, property, and other privileges. Although the first appointed archbishop (John of Debar) was Bulgarian, his successors, as well as the higher clergy, were predominantly Byzantine. The monks and lower clergy, however, remained largely Bulgarian. To a considerable extent, the archbishopric preserved its national character, maintained the Slavonic liturgy, and continued to contribute to the development of Bulgarian literature. The Archbishopric of Ohrid retained its autonomous status under Byzantine, Bulgarian, Serbian, and Ottoman rule. It continued to exist until its abolition in 1767 by the Ottoman Empire, which then controlled the region.

=== Tarnovo Patriarchate ===
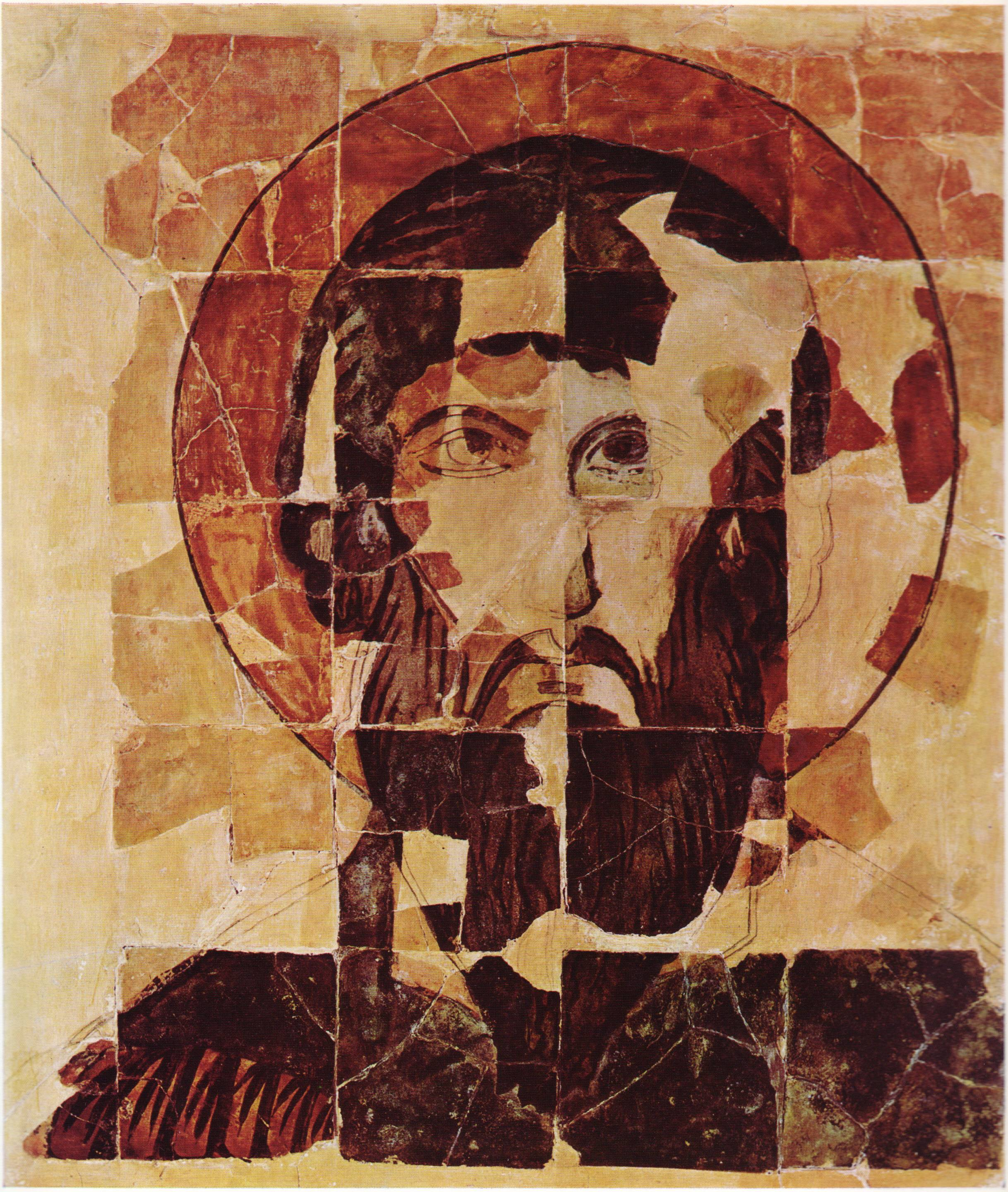
Ceramic icon of Saint Theodore, Preslav ceramics, c. 900

As a result of the successful uprising of the brothers Peter IV and Ivan Asen I in 1185/1186, the foundations of the Second Bulgarian Empire were laid with Tarnovo as its capital. Following Boris I’s principle that the sovereignty of the state is inextricably linked to the autocephaly of the Church, the two brothers immediately took steps to restore the Bulgarian Patriarchate. They initially established an independent archbishopric in Tarnovo in 1186. It required almost 50 years of struggle for this archbishopric to receive recognition and elevation to the rank of a patriarchate according to the canonical order. Following the example of Boris I, Bulgarian Tsar Kaloyan manoeuvred for years between the Patriarch of Constantinople and Pope Innocent III. Finally, in 1203, the latter proclaimed the Tarnovo Archbishop Vassily "Primate and Archbishop of all Bulgaria and Walachia." The union with the Roman Catholic Church continued for well over two decades.

Under the reign of Tsar Ivan Asen II (1218–1241), conditions were created for the termination of the union with Rome and for the recognition of the autocephalous status of the Bulgarian Orthodox Church. In 1235, a church council was convened in the town of Lampsakos. Under the presidency of Patriarch Germanus II of Constantinople and with the consent of all Eastern patriarchs, the council confirmed the patriarchal dignity of the Bulgarian Orthodox Church and consecrated the Bulgarian archbishop German as patriarch.

Despite a reduction in the size of the boundaries of the diocese of the Tarnovo Patriarchate at the end of the 13th century, its authority in the Eastern Orthodox world remained high. The Patriarch of Tarnovo confirmed the patriarchal dignity of the Serbian Orthodox Church in 1346, despite protests by the Patriarchate of Constantinople. The Tarnovo Literary School developed under the wing of the patriarchate in the 14th century, with scholars of the rank of Patriarch Evtimiy, Gregory Tsamblak, and Konstantin of Kostenets. A considerable flowering was noted in the fields of literature, architecture, and painting; religious and theological literature also flourished.

=== Ottoman rule ===
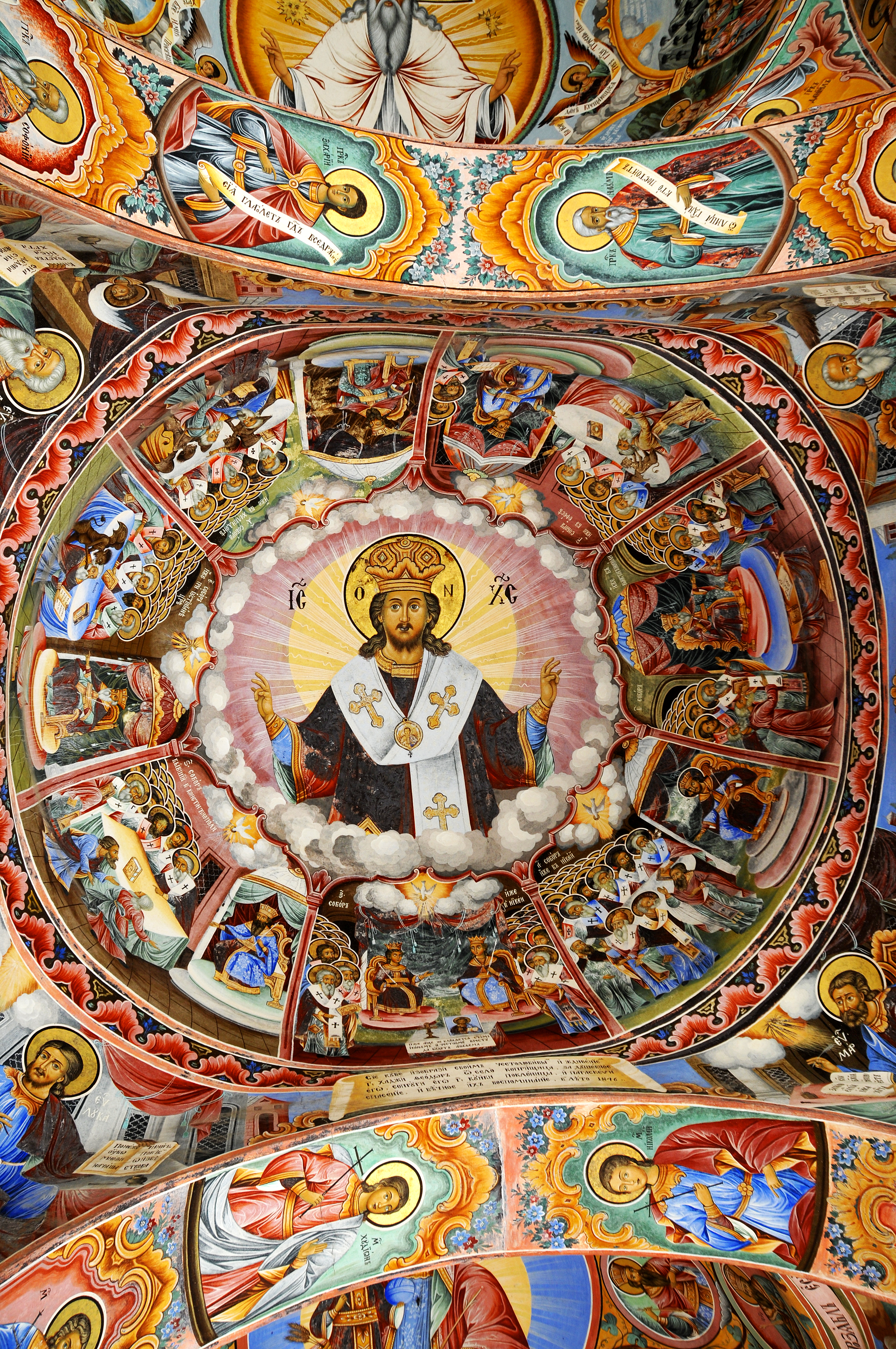
The Frescoes of Rila Monastery

Tarnovo fell under domination by the Ottoman Empire in 1393. The Ottomans sent Patriarch Evtimiy into exile, and the autocephaly of the church was revoked the next year. The church was organizationally integrated into the Ecumenical Patriarchate. In 1394, the Holy Synod of the Ecumenical Patriarchate gave the authorization to the Metropolitan of Moldavia, Jeremiah, "to move with the help of God to the holy Church of Turnovo and to be allowed to perform everything befitting a prelate freely and without restraint." By around 1416, the territory of the Patriarchate of Turnovo was totally subordinated to the Ecumenical Patriarchate. The other Bulgarian religious centre – the Ohrid Archbishopric – survived until 1767.

Following the execution of many leaders of the Bulgarian Orthodox Church, it was fully subordinated to the Patriarch of Constantinople. The millet system in the Ottoman Empire granted a number of important civil and judicial functions to the Patriarch of Constantinople and the diocesan metropolitans. After the higher-ranking Bulgarian church clerics were replaced by Greek ones at the beginning of the Ottoman period, the Bulgarian population was subjected to double oppression – politically by the Ottomans and culturally by the Greek clergy.

With the rise of Greek nationalism in the second half of the 18th century, the clergy imposed the Greek language and a Greek cultural consciousness on the emerging Bulgarian bourgeoisie. They used the Patriarchate of Constantinople to assimilate other peoples. By the late 18th and early 19th centuries, the clergy had established numerous schools that taught in Greek rather than Bulgarian and had nearly banned Bulgarian-language liturgy. These actions threatened the survival of Bulgarians as a distinct nation with their own unique national culture.

Throughout the centuries of Ottoman domination, Orthodox monasteries were instrumental in the preservation of the Bulgarian language and Bulgarian national consciousness. Especially important were the Zograph and Hilandar monasteries on Mount Athos, as well as the Rila, Troyan, Etropole, Dryanovo, Cherepish, and Dragalevtsi monasteries in Bulgaria. The monks managed to preserve their national character in the monasteries, continuing traditions of the Slavonic liturgy and Bulgarian literature. They continued to operate monastery schools and carried out other educational activities, which managed to keep the flame of Bulgarian culture burning.

=== Bulgarian Exarchate ===
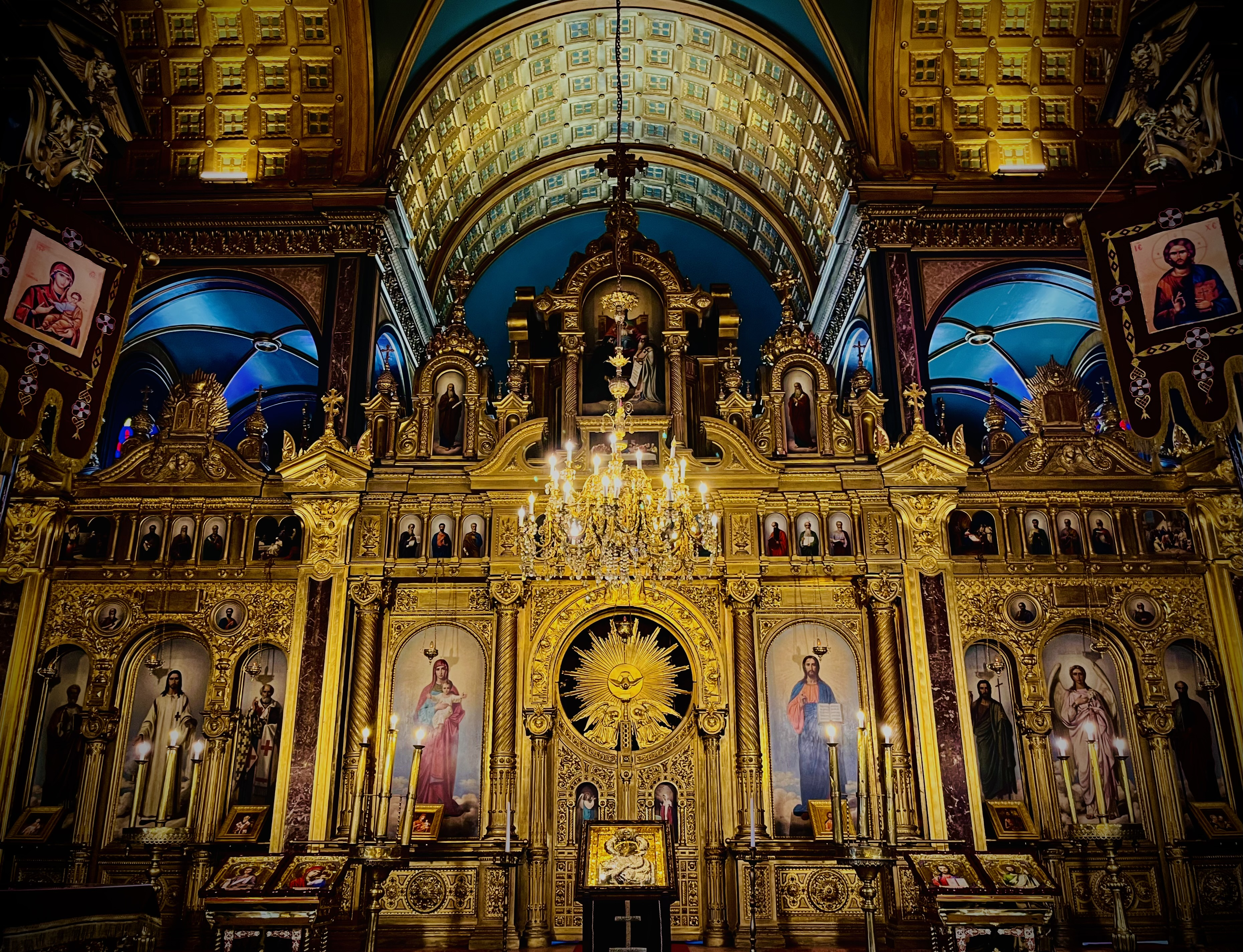
Interior of St. Stephen's Church, Istanbul

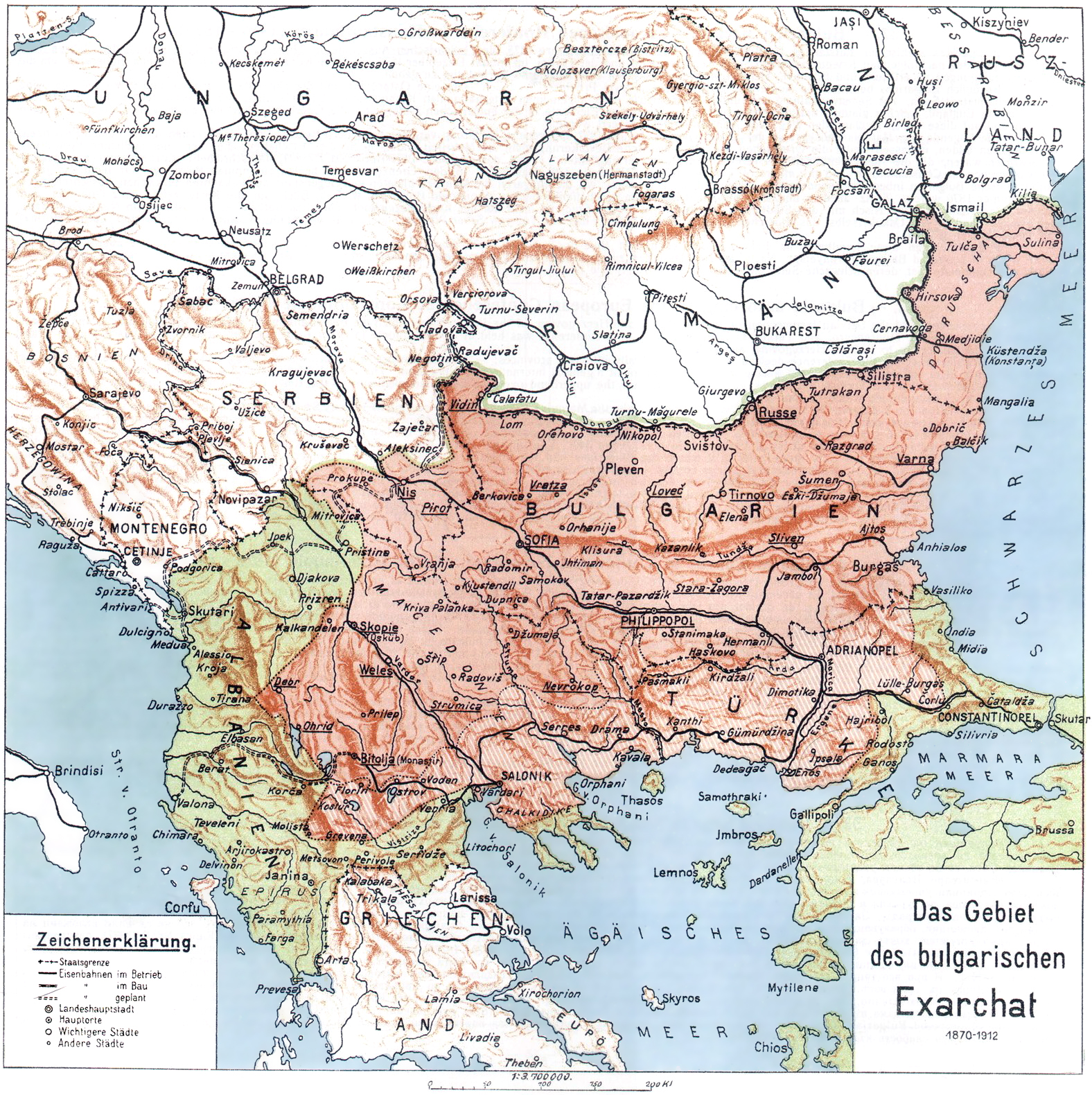
Map of the Bulgarian Exarchate (1870–1913)

In 1762, St. Paisius of Hilendar (1722–1773), a monk from the southwestern Bulgarian town of Bansko, wrote a short historical work. It was the first work written in the modern Bulgarian vernacular and was also the first call for a national awakening. In History of Slav-Bulgarians, Paisius urged his compatriots to throw off subjugation to the Greek language and culture. The example of Paisius was followed by a number of other activists, including St. Sophroniy of Vratsa (Sofroni Vrachanski) (1739–1813), hieromonk Spiridon of Gabrovo, hieromonk Yoakim Karchovski (d. 1820), and hieromonk Kiril Peychinovich (d. 1845).

Discontent with the supremacy of the Greek clergy started to flare up in several Bulgarian dioceses as early as the 1820s. However, it was not until 1850 that the Bulgarians purposefully struggled against the Greek clerics in a number of bishoprics, demanding their replacement with Bulgarian ones. By that time, most Bulgarian clergy had realized that further struggle for the rights of the Bulgarians in the Ottoman Empire could not succeed unless they managed to obtain some degree of autonomy from the Patriarchate of Constantinople. As the Ottomans identified nationality with religion, and the Bulgarians were Eastern Orthodox, the Ottomans considered them part of the Rum-Millet, i.e., the Greeks. To gain Bulgarian schools and liturgy, the Bulgarians needed to achieve an independent ecclesiastical organization.

The struggle between the Bulgarians, led by Neofit Bozveli and Ilarion Makariopolski, and the Greeks intensified throughout the 1860s. In early April 1860, the name of the Ecumenical Patriarch was intentionally omitted during a prayer at Easter in the Bulgarian St. Stephen Church in Constantinople, which could be seen as a unilateral declaration of Bulgarian ecclesiastical independence. By the end of the decade, Bulgarian bishoprics had expelled most of the Greek clerics. Thus, the whole of northern Bulgaria, as well as the northern parts of Thrace and Macedonia, had effectively seceded from the patriarchate. The Ottoman government restored the Bulgarian Patriarchate under the name of the "Bulgarian Exarchate" by a decree (firman) of the Sultan promulgated on February 28, 1870. The original Exarchate extended over present-day northern Bulgaria (Moesia), Thrace without the Vilayet of Adrianople, as well as over north-eastern Macedonia. After the Christian population of the bishoprics of Skopje and Ohrid voted in 1874 overwhelmingly in favor of joining the Exarchate (Skopje by 91%, Ohrid by 97%), the Bulgarian Exarchate came to control the whole of Vardar and Pirin Macedonia. The Bulgarian Exarchate was partially represented in southern Macedonia and the Vilayet of Adrianople by vicars. Thus, the borders of the Exarchate included all Bulgarian districts in the Ottoman Empire. The Patriarchate of Constantinople opposed the change, promptly declaring the Bulgarian Exarchate schismatic and its adherents heretics. Although the status and the guiding principles of the Exarchate reflected the canons, the patriarchate argued that “surrender of Orthodoxy to ethnic nationalism” was essentially a manifestation of heresy.

The first Bulgarian Exarch was Antim I, who was elected by the Holy Synod of the Exarchate in February 1872. He was discharged by the Ottoman government immediately after the outbreak of the Russo-Turkish War on April 24, 1877, and was sent into exile in Ankara. His successor, Joseph I, managed to develop and considerably extend the church and school network in the Bulgarian Principality, Eastern Rumelia, Macedonia, and the Adrianople Vilayet. In 1895, the Tarnovo Constitution formally established the Bulgarian Orthodox Church as the national religion of the nation. On the eve of the Balkan Wars, in Macedonia and the Adrianople Vilayet, the Bulgarian Exarchate had seven dioceses with prelates and eight more with acting chairmen in charge, and 38 vicariates; 1,218 parishes and 1,212 parish priests; 64 monasteries and 202 chapels; as well as 1,373 schools with 2,266 teachers and 78,854 pupils. Between 1915 and 1945, the Church was governed by the Holy Synod, similar to the Most Holy Synod of the Russian Orthodox Church.

During World War II, the Bulgarian Orthodox Church played a significant role in opposing the deportation of Jews from Bulgaria in 1943. At the time, Bulgaria was allied with Nazi Germany and had adopted anti-Jewish legislation under the Law for Protection of the Nation.

As deportation preparations proceeded in Plovdiv and other cities, Metropolitan Cyril of Bulgaria intervened with local civil and police authorities and maintained contact with representatives of the Jewish community. He sent a protest telegram to Tsar Boris III of Bulgaria and declared that he would lie down on the railway tracks in order to physically block deportation trains if the deportations were carried out.

Concurrently, Metropolitan Stefan I of Bulgaria addressed formal appeals to the royal court and government institutions, calling for the revocation of deportation measures and framing his opposition in religious and ethical terms. He also expressed willingness to provide shelter to Jews within church properties, including monasteries.

These interventions coincided with broader public and political opposition, including actions by members of parliament, intellectuals, and civic leaders. The combined pressure contributed to the suspension of deportation plans for approximately 48,000 Jews residing within Bulgaria’s pre-war borders.

=== Second restoration of the Bulgarian Patriarchate ===
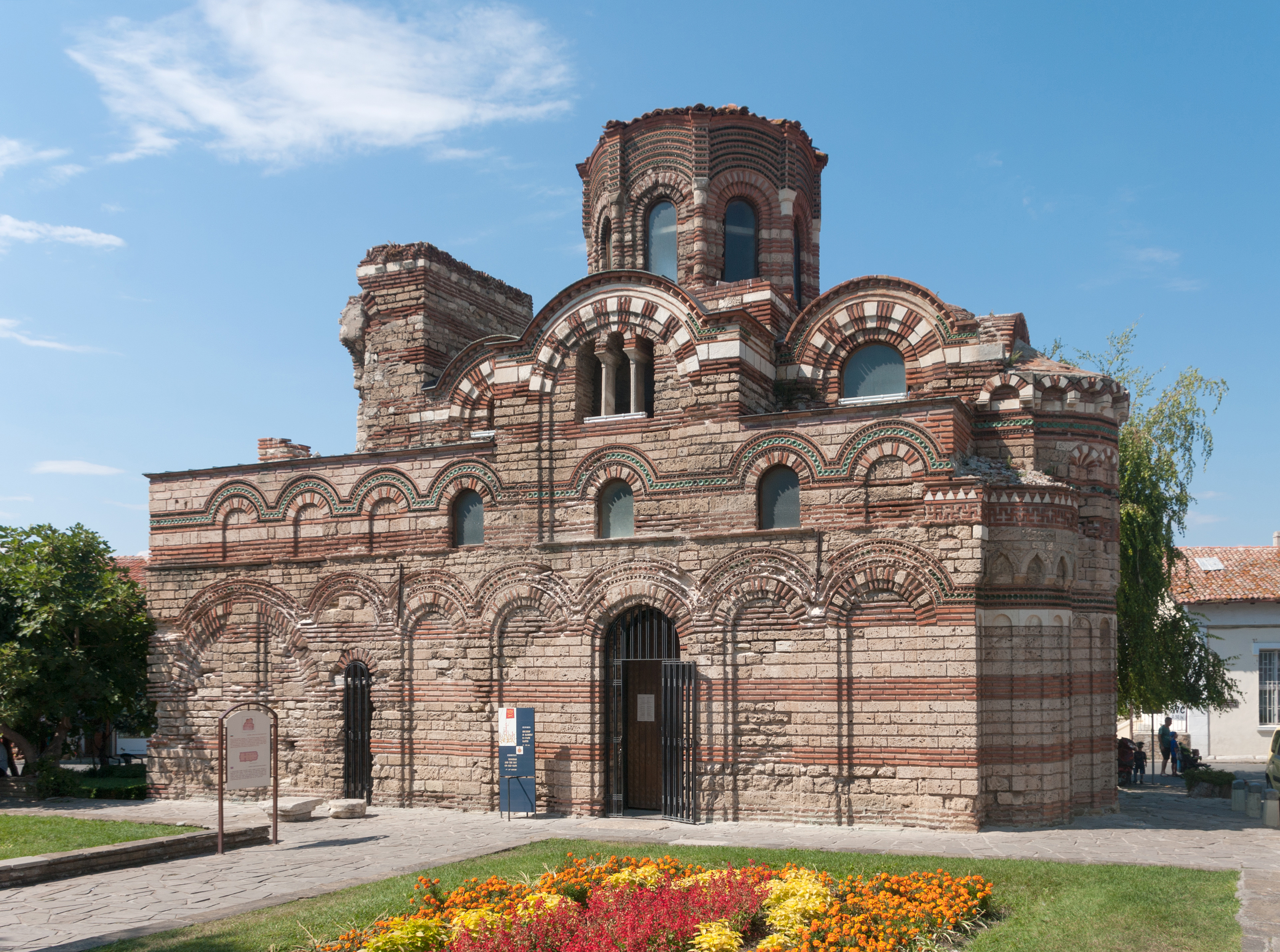
Church of Christ Pantocrator, Nesebar

Conditions for the restoration of the Bulgarian Patriarchate and the election of a head of the Bulgarian Church were created after World War II. In 1945, the schism was lifted, and the Patriarch of Constantinople recognised the autocephaly of the Bulgarian Church. In 1950, the Holy Synod adopted a new statute, which paved the way for the restoration of the patriarchate. In 1953, it elected the Metropolitan of Plovdiv, Cyril, as Bulgarian patriarch.

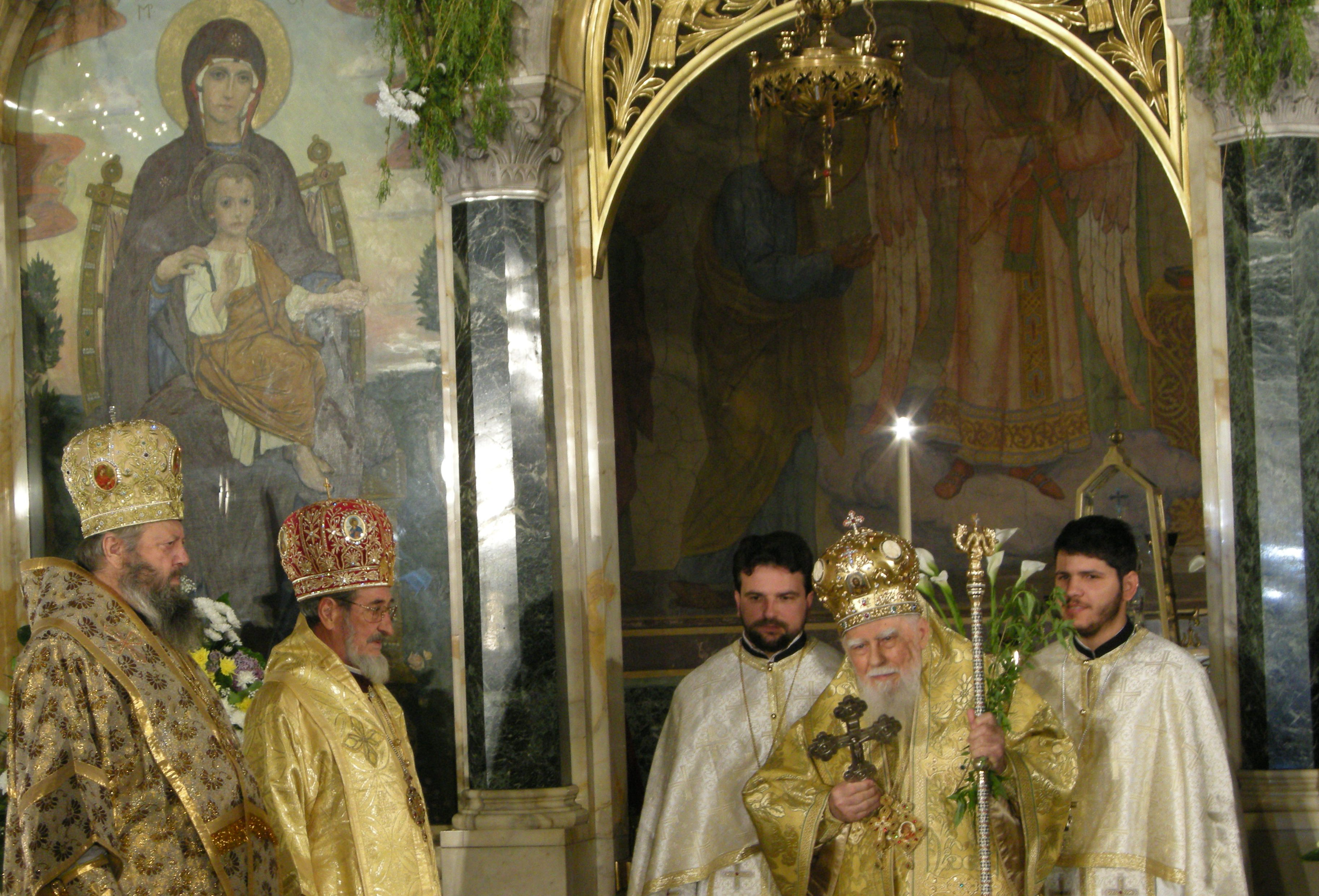
Maxim, the late Patriarch of Bulgaria and Metropolitan of Sofia.

After the death of Patriarch Cyril in 1971, the Metropolitan of Lovech, Maxim, was elected patriarch and led the Church until his death in 2012. On 10 November 2012, Metropolitan Cyril of Varna and Veliki Preslav was chosen as interim leader to organize the election of a new patriarch within four months. At the church council convened on 24 February 2013, the Metropolitan of Ruse, Neophyt, was elected patriarch of the Bulgarian Orthodox Church, receiving 90 votes against 47 for Metropolitan Gabriel of Lovech.

Under Communism (1944–1989), the Bulgarian Orthodox Church operated under significant state control. During the early postwar years, the Church was deprived of jurisdiction over marriage, divorce, the issuance of birth and death certificates, and other functions that had both religious and civil significance. Religious education, including catechism and church history, was removed from school curricula, and anti-religious propaganda was promoted.

The period from 1947 to 1949 marked the most intensive phase of state pressure on the Church. Bishop Boris was assassinated, Egumenius Kalistrat, administrator of the Rila Monastery, was imprisoned, and other clergy were killed or prosecuted on political grounds. Clergy who refused to support the regime's policies were removed, and Exarch Stefan was banished after co-authoring a book in 1948 considered anti-Communist.

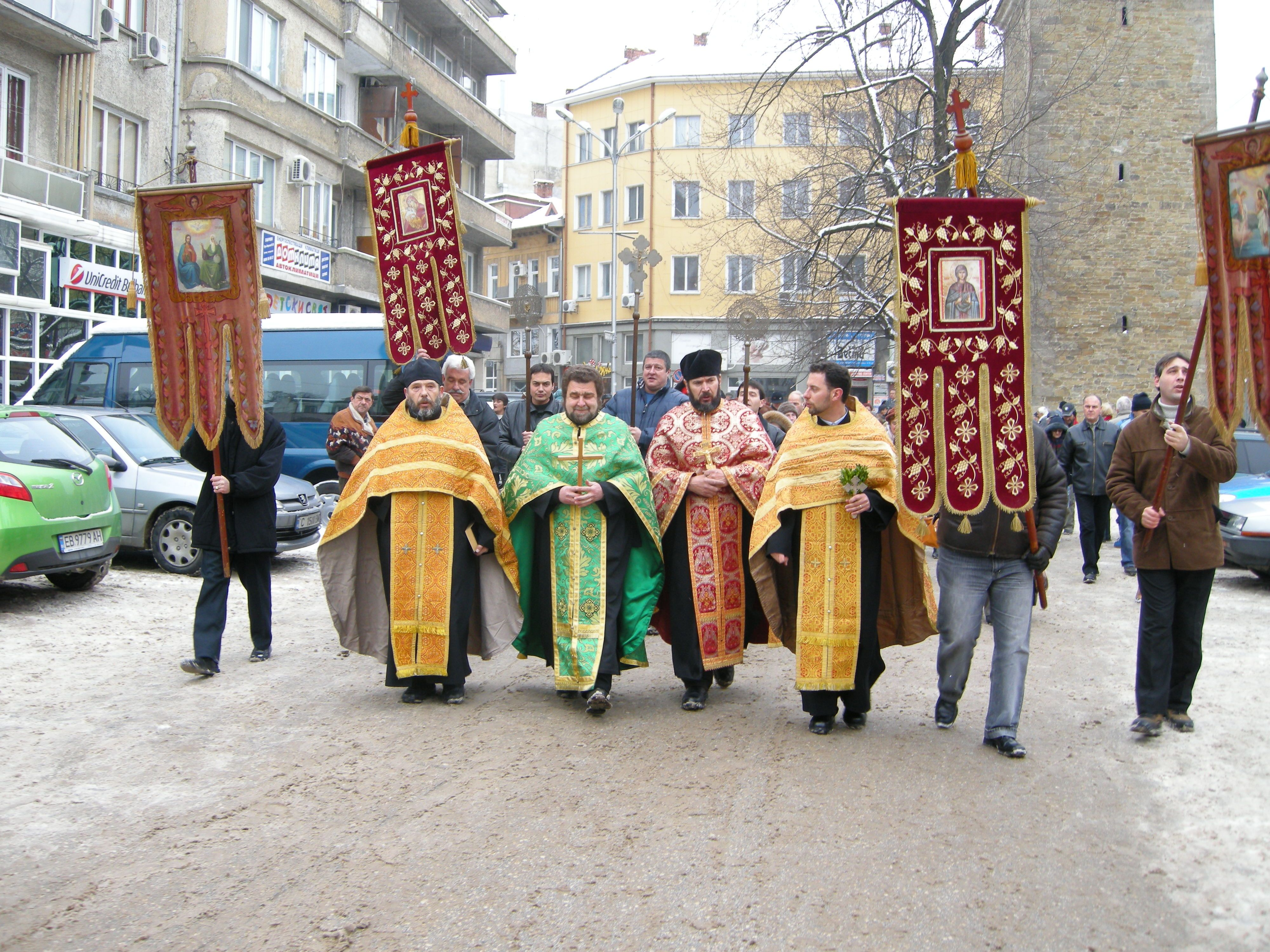
Bulgarian Orthodox Priests

From the late 1940s until the end of Communist rule in 1989, the Bulgarian Orthodox Church and the Bulgarian Communist Party, along with State Security, maintained a closely interdependent relationship. Eleven of the fifteen members of the Holy Synod were later revealed to have cooperated with State Security. The state also supported the elevation of the exarchate to the rank of patriarchate in May 1953. A 1970 commemoration highlighted the historical jurisdiction of the exarchate, which had included Macedonia and Thrace in addition to present-day Bulgaria prior to World War I.

In 2013, the Bulgarian Orthodox Church was nominated for the Nobel Peace Prize by a Bulgarian Member of Parliament due to its role in the rescue of Jews during World War II. It was the first religious institution to receive such a nomination.

Along with the wider Orthodox Church, the Bulgarian Orthodox Church did not initially recognize the autocephaly of the Macedonian Orthodox Church, following its unilateral declaration in 1967. However, after the Ecumenical Patriarchate and Serbian Orthodox Church restored communion with the Macedonian Church in May 2022, the Bulgarian Church followed on 22 June 2022.

Patriarch Neophyte died at a hospital in Sofia on 13 March 2024, at the age of 78, following a lung illness that had lasted for several months. On 30 June 2024, at the Patriarchal Electoral Church–People's Council in Sofia, Metropolitan Daniil was elected Patriarch of Bulgaria and Metropolitan of Sofia.

== Canonical status and organization ==
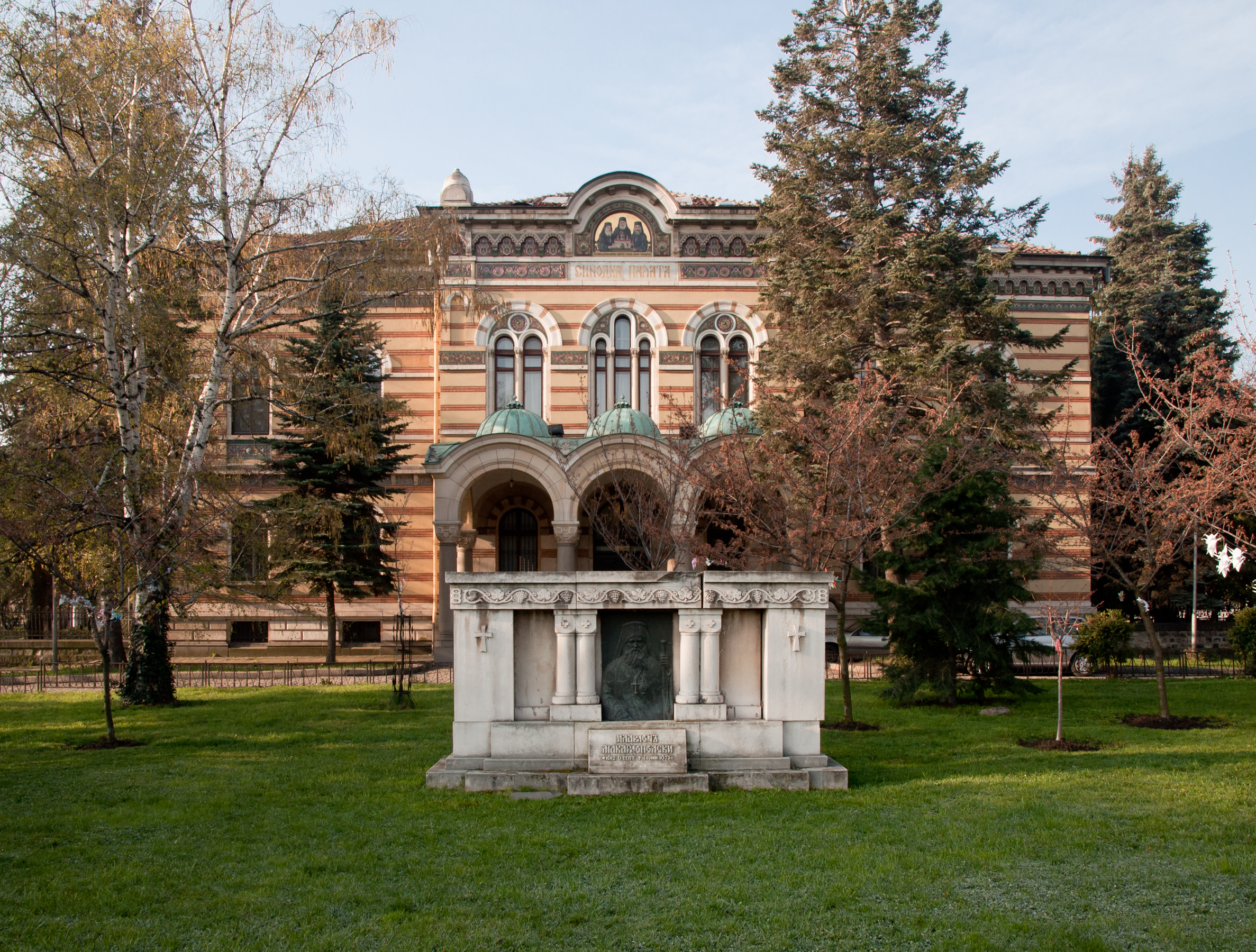
Synodal Palace, Sofia

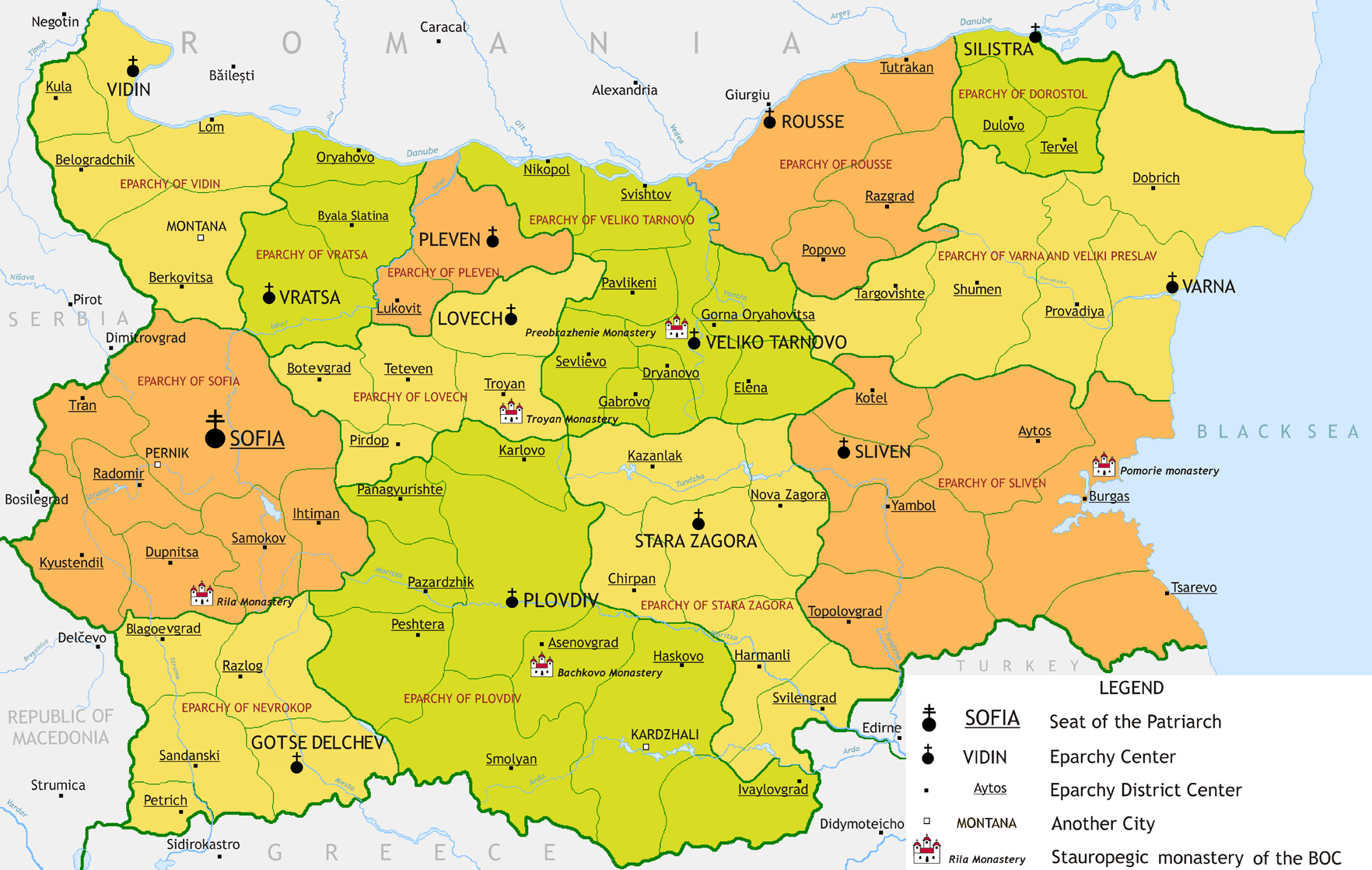
Eparchies of the Bulgarian Orthodox Church in Bulgaria

The Bulgarian Orthodox Church is an autocephalous Eastern Orthodox church and considers itself part of the one, holy, catholic and apostolic church. It is organized as a self-governing body under the name of a patriarchate. It is divided into thirteen dioceses within the boundaries of the Republic of Bulgaria and has jurisdiction over two additional dioceses serving Bulgarians in Western and Central Europe, as well as in the Americas, Canada and Australia. The dioceses of the Bulgarian Orthodox Church are subdivided into 58 church counties, which are further divided into approximately 2,600 parishes. The supreme clerical, judicial and administrative authority of the church is exercised by the Bulgarian Holy Synod, which includes the patriarch and the diocesan prelates, known as metropolitans. Parish life is overseen by parish priests, numbering approximately 1,500.

Eparchies in Bulgaria: (with Bulgarian names in brackets)

- Eparchy of Vidin (Видинска епархия)
- Eparchy of Vratsa (Врачанска епархия)
- Eparchy of Lovech (Ловешка епархия)
- Eparchy of Veliko Tarnovo (Търновска епархия)
- Eparchy of Dorostol (Доростолска епархия) (seat in Silistra)
- Eparchy of Varna and Veliki Preslav (Варненскa и Bеликопреславска епархия) (seat in Varna)
- Eparchy of Sliven (Сливенска епархия)
- Eparchy of Stara Zagora (Старозагорска епархия)
- Eparchy of Plovdiv (Пловдивска епархия)
- Eparchy of Sofia (Софийска епархия)
- Eparchy of Nevrokop (Неврокопска епархия)
- Eparchy of Pleven (Плевенска епархия)
- Eparchy of Ruse (Русенска епархия)

Eparchies abroad:

- Eparchy of Central and Western Europe (with seat in Berlin);
- Eparchy of USA, Canada and Australia (with seat in New York City)

The Bulgarian Orthodox Church also has some 120 monasteries in Bulgaria, with about 2,000 monks and nearly as many nuns.

== See also ==
- Religion in Bulgaria
- Pliska Literary School
- Ohrid Literary School
- Tarnovo Literary School
- List of patriarchs of the Bulgarian Orthodox Church
