= Oreshak, Lovech Province =

Oreshak Орешак
- Village
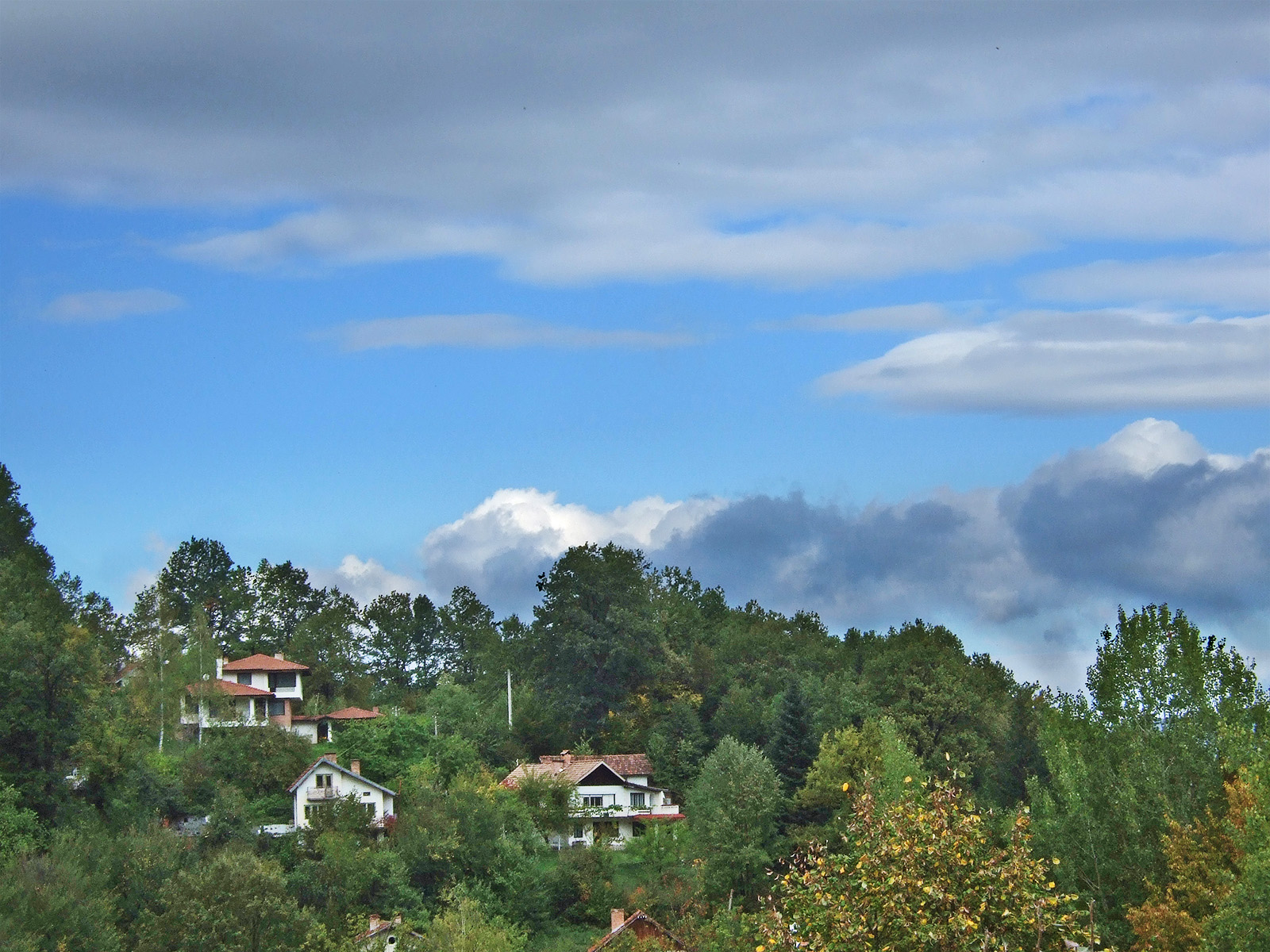
- A view of the village of Oreshak.

- Location in Bulgaria
- Coordinates: 42°53′N 24°46′E
- Country: Bulgaria
- Province: Lovech
- Municipality: Troyan

Government
  - Mayor: Maya Naydenova (GERB)

Population (2024)
  - Total: 1,927
- Time zone: UTC+2 (EET)
  - Summer (DST): UTC+3 (EEST)
- Postal code: 5630

Oreshak (Bulgarian: Орешак) is a village situated in the middle part of the Balkan Mountains in Troyan Municipality, Lovech Province, Bulgaria. There is a famous ethnographic complex very close to the Troyan Monastery — one of the biggest monasteries in Bulgaria. In 2024, the village had a population of 1,927 (2021 census). The late Bulgarian Patriarch Maxim was born in Oreshak on October 29, 1914, and was buried at Troyan Monastery after his death in November 2012.
