= Maxim of Bulgaria =

Bulgarian Orthodox Patriarch from 1971 to 2012

His Holiness Maxim
- Patriarch of All Bulgaria; Metropolitan of Sofia
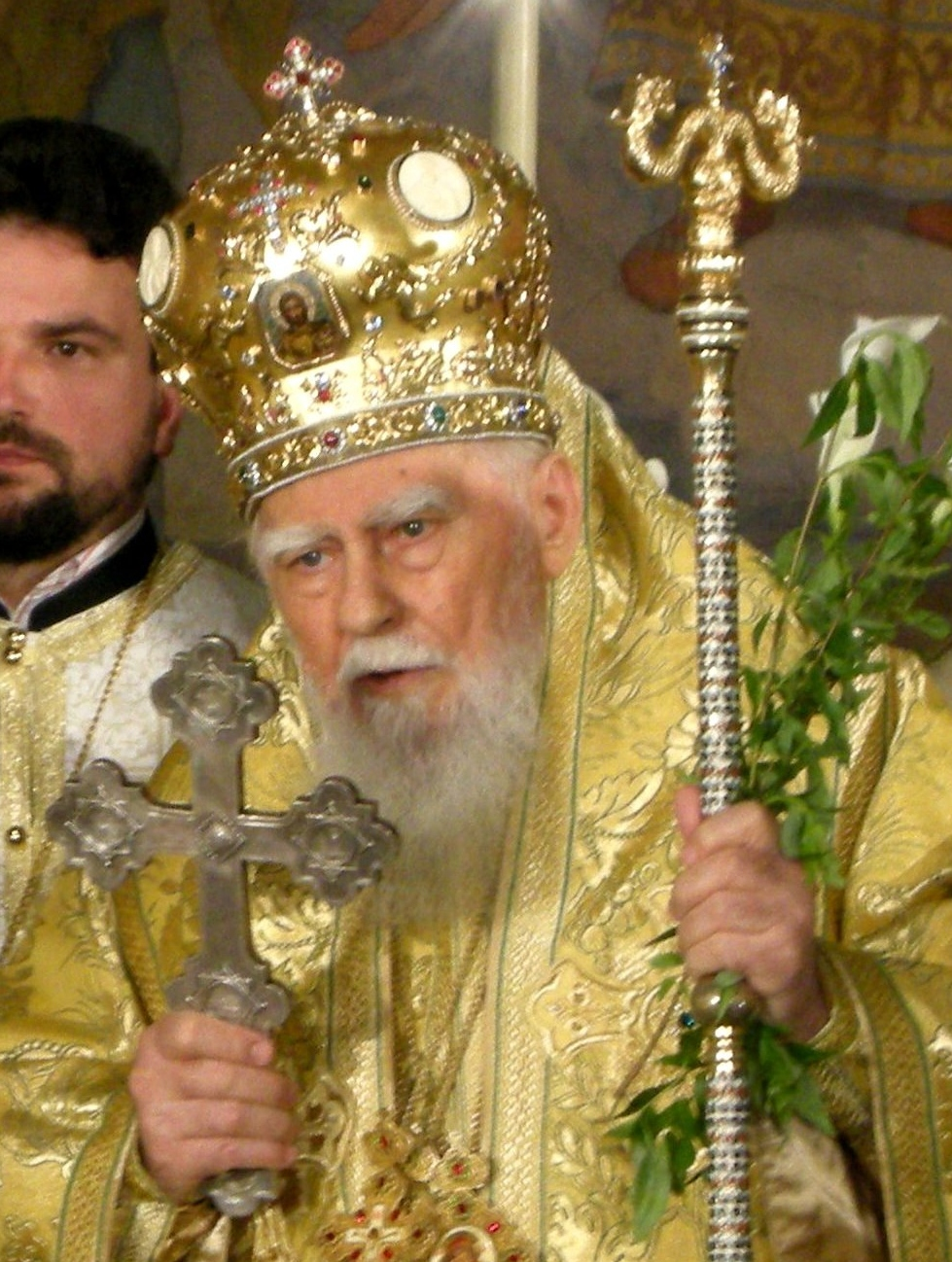
- Native name: Патриарх Максим
- Church: Bulgarian Orthodox Church
- See: Sofia
- Installed: 4 July 1971
- Term ended: 6 November 2012
- Predecessor: Kyril
- Successor: Neofit
- Previous posts: Protosyngellos of Dorostolo-Cherven (diocese) (1947‍–‍1950); Primate of the Bulgarian Ecclesiastical Court at the Moscow Patriarchate (1950‍–‍1955); Secretary General of the Holy Synod (1955‍–‍1960); Titular bishop of Branit (1956‍–‍1960); Metropolitan of Lovech (1960‍–‍1971)

Orders
- Ordination: 1941
- Consecration: 1956
- Rank: Patriarch

Personal details
- Born: Marin Naydenov Minkov; October 29, 1914 Oreshak, Bulgaria
- Died: November 6, 2012 (aged 98) Sofia, Bulgaria
- Buried: Troyan Monastery
- Education: Sofia Theological Seminary; Faculty of Theology of Sofia University

Patriarch Maxim (Maximus) (Bulgarian: Патриарх Максим) (born Marin Naydenov Minkov, October 29, 1914 – November 6, 2012) was the head of the Bulgarian Orthodox Church from 1971 until his death.

He was born in Oreshak, the second of the two children of Nayden Minkov Rachev and Pena Bordzhukova, but very little is known about his parents' background. He was educated only in his native mountain village of Oreshak but from his late childhood, he became a novice monk in the Troyan Monastery and then studied Orthodox Theology at Sofia University, from which he graduated in 1935 with honours. In 1942 he graduated from the Saint Clement of Ohrid State University of Sofia. He took Holy Orders in 1941 and became secretary general of the Holy Synod in 1955 and titular bishop of Branit on December 30, 1956.

In 1960, he was elected Metropolitan of Lovech on October 30, 1960, and won the election as Patriarch on July 4, 1971, after Patriarch Kyril died.

In the early 1990s, a split in the Bulgarian Church was stimulated by the government of the Union of Democratic Forces, based on the alleged cooperation and affiliation of Maxim with the former regime. However, Maxim was able to take control of the majority of the parishes and to prevent any schismatic threats within the Church. The faction against Maxim formed the Bulgarian Orthodox Church – Alternative synod.

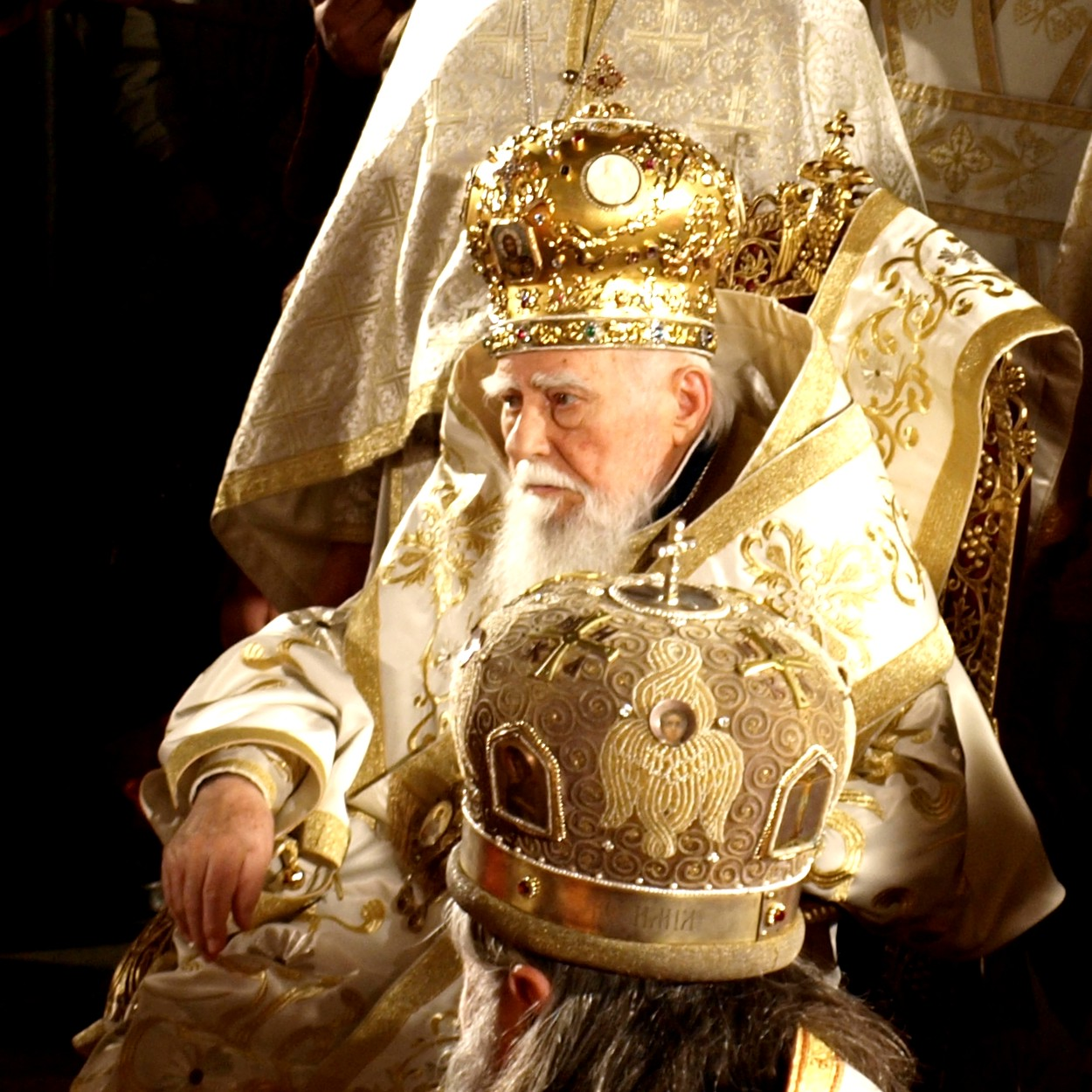
April 2011

Eastern Orthodox Church titles
Preceded by Kyril	Patriarch of All Bulgaria; 1971–2012	Succeeded by Neofit
Preceded by unknown	Metropolitan of Lovech; 1960–1971	Succeeded by unknown
Preceded by unknown	Titular bishop of Branit; 1956–1960	Succeeded by unknown
