= Neophyte of Bulgaria =

Bulgarian Orthodox Patriarch from 2012 to 2024

His Holiness Neophyte
- 28th Patriarch of All Bulgaria; Metropolitan of Sofia
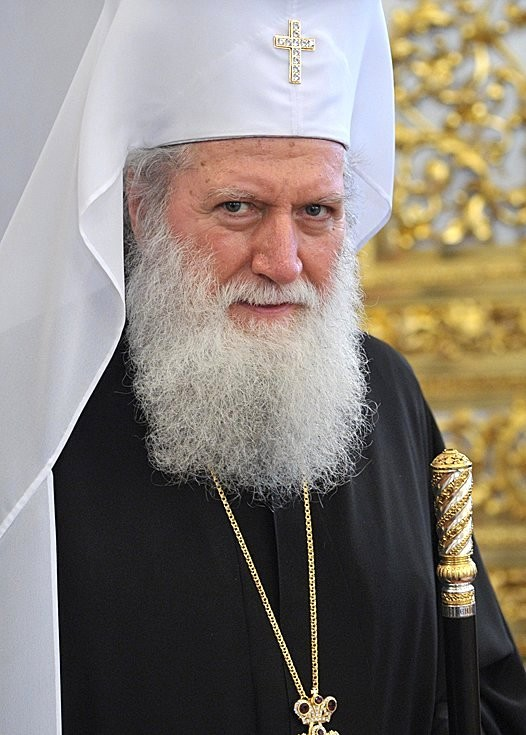
- Bulgarian patriarch Neophyte just after his inauguration in 2013
- Native name: Патриарх Неофит
- Church: Bulgarian Orthodox Church
- See: Sofia
- Installed: 24 February 2013
- Term ended: 13 March 2024
- Predecessor: Maxim
- Successor: Daniel
- Previous posts: Metropolitan Bishop of Ruse (2001‍–‍2013); Bishop of Dorostol and Cherven (1994‍–‍2001)

Orders
- Rank: Patriarch

Personal details
- Born: Simeon Nikolov Dimitrov; 15 October 1945 Sofia, Bulgaria
- Died: 13 March 2024 (aged 78) Sofia, Bulgaria
- Buried: Saint Nedelya Cathedral, Sofia
- Denomination: Eastern Orthodox Church

Patriarch Neophyte (Bulgarian: Патриарх Неофит, romanized: Patriarch Neofit; secular name: Simeon Nikolov Dimitrov; Bulgarian: Симеон Николов Димитров; 15 October 1945 – 13 March 2024) was the Patriarch of All Bulgaria, head of the Bulgarian Orthodox Church from 24 February 2013 until his death on 13 March 2024. Prior to his election, he was the Metropolitan Bishop of Ruse (2001–2013) and Bishop of Dorostol and Cherven (1994–2001).

== Biography ==
Styles of Patriarch Neophyte
- Reference style: His Holiness
- Spoken style: Your Holiness
- Religious style: Patriarch

After completing his primary education in the fall of 1959, Dimitrov was accepted as a student at the Sofia Theological Seminary in Cherepish Monastery, and completed his studies in 1965. In 1971 he graduated from the Sofia Theological Academy of St. Clement of Ohrid, and later trained in church singing at the Moscow Theological Academy.

On 3 August 1975, at the Troyan Monastery, he took monastic vows with the name Neophyte in a ceremony overseen by Patriarch Maxim of Bulgaria. The following year, he was ordained hierodeacon the same month and as hieromonk at the St. Nedelya Church in Sofia. From 1975 onwards he was conductor of the ecclesiastical choir in Sofia and in 1977 became a lecturer in Orthodox Singing at the Sofia Theological Academy.

Neophyte was ordained archimandrite by Patriarch Maxim on 21 November 1977 at St Nedelya Church.

Between 1983 and 1990, Neophyte was an agent of the Sixth Directorate of the Committee for State Security, communist secret police, under the secret name "Simeonov". Sixteen pages of his personal file have been preserved, in which Neophyte was described as:

"Very religious, devoted to the church, Bishop Neophyte is formed as a conservative young prelates, supporters to keep the old traditions of the Orthodox Church. Particularly active events in expanding religious activities started after the socialist countries in processes of reconstruction and democratization, especially after the USSR held a celebration of the 1000th anniversary of the Russian Orthodox Church. Began openly to advocate for full independence and non-interference of the state in religious activities and church government."

Neophyte died at a hospital in Sofia on 13 March 2024, at the age of 78 after having suffered from a lung illness in the previous four months. The Bulgarian government declared two days of mourning over his death. He was buried at Saint Nedelya Church on 16 March following a memorial service at the Saint Alexander Nevski Cathedral officiated by Ecumenical Patriarch Bartholomew of Constantinople.

== Bishop ==
On 8 December 1985, at the Patriarchal cathedral of St. Alexander Nevsky, Neophyte was ordained Titular Bishop of Levki and was appointed second Vicar bishop of the Eparchy of Sofia.

On 1 December 1989, Bishop Neophyte was elected Rector of the Sofia Theological Academy, and after the restoration of the Faculty of Theology of the Sofia University on 26 July 1991, Neophyte was elected dean of the restored Faculty. He was later appointed Chief Secretary of the Holy Synod and Chairman of the Church Trusteeship of Saint Alexander Nevsky Cathedral. He held the post until January 1992, when he was appointed Secretary of the Holy Synod. As Secretary of the Holy Synod and chairman of the church board at the Cathedral of St. Alexander Nevski during the schism in the Bulgarian Orthodox Church, he played an important role in the negotiations for the liberation of the occupied Synod Office.

On 27 March 1994, he was elevated to the title of Metropolitan bishop, and on 3 April the same year was appointed a diocesan Bishop of the Eparchy of Dorostol and Cherven. In 2001, the fifth ecclesiastical and national council decided to split the Eparchy of Dorostol and Cherven into separate eparchies of Dorostol and Ruse, at which time Neophyte was titled Bishop of Ruse.

== Patriarch ==
After the death of Patriarch Maxim on 10 November 2012, Neophyte was supported by one of 12 bishops present at an election by secret ballot for deputy chairman of the Bulgarian Orthodox Church. At the church council convened to elect a new Patriarch on 24 February 2013, he was elected Patriarch of the Bulgarian Orthodox Church with 90 votes, against 47 for Metropolitan Gabriel of Lovech.

As Patriarch, he met with Pope Francis during the latter's visit to Bulgaria in 2019, in what was seen to be a thaw in relations between the Eastern Orthodox Church and the Catholic Church.

Eastern Orthodox Church titles
Preceded by Maxim	Patriarch of All Bulgaria; 2013–2024	Succeeded by Daniel
New diocese	Bishop of Ruse; 2001–2013	Succeeded by Naum (Dimitrov)
Preceded by Sophronius (Stoychev)	Bishop of Dorostol and Cherven; 1994–2001	Succeeded by Hilarion (Tsonev) as Bishop of Dorostol
