= Troyan Monastery =

Bulgarian monastery

Coordinates: 42°51′45″N 24°46′50″E

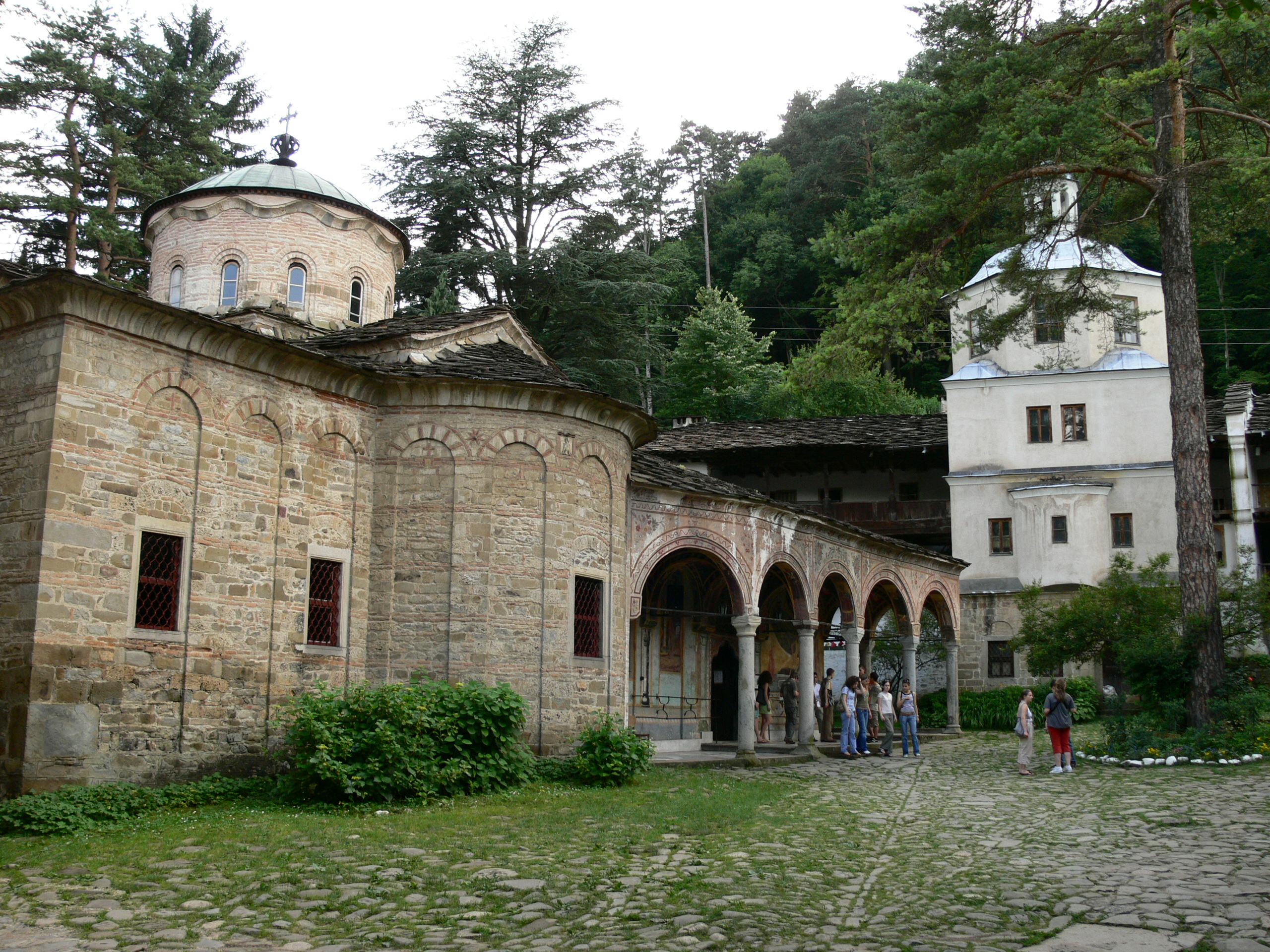
The Troyan Monastery

The Monastery of the Dormition of the Most Holy Mother of God (Bulgarian: Троянски манастир „Успение Богородично“) or, as it is more commonly called, the Troyan Monastery is the third largest monastery in Bulgaria. It is located in the northern part of the country in the Balkan Mountains and was founded no later than the end of the 16th century.

The monastery is situated on the banks of the Cherni Osam near Oreshak, a village 10 km from Troyan in Lovech Province, and is a popular tourist destination.

The main church of the monastery was reconstructed near the end of Ottoman rule during the Bulgarian National Revival period by a master-builder called Konstantin in 1835. The ornate interior and exterior of the church were painted between 1847 and 1849 by Zahari Zograph, a popular Bulgarian painter of the time, who also painted the central church of the Rila Monastery, the largest monastery in Bulgaria. Many of the "moral and social experiments" of art at the time such as Doomsday and Wheel of Life were reproduced at Troyan. One highly controversial move by Zograph was to paint his image around one of the windows in the back of the church.

The iconostasis in the central church is a wood carving dating to 1839.

The Troyan Monastery is also, since the 17th century, the home of one of the holiest icons in Bulgarian Orthodoxy, the Three-Handed Virgin.

Many people make a pilgrimage to this monastery on St. George's Day because of an icon of St. George in the main church. The room in which Bulgarian revolutionary Vasil Levski was hiding and meeting with other revolutionaries during the Ottoman period is a museum.

== Gallery ==
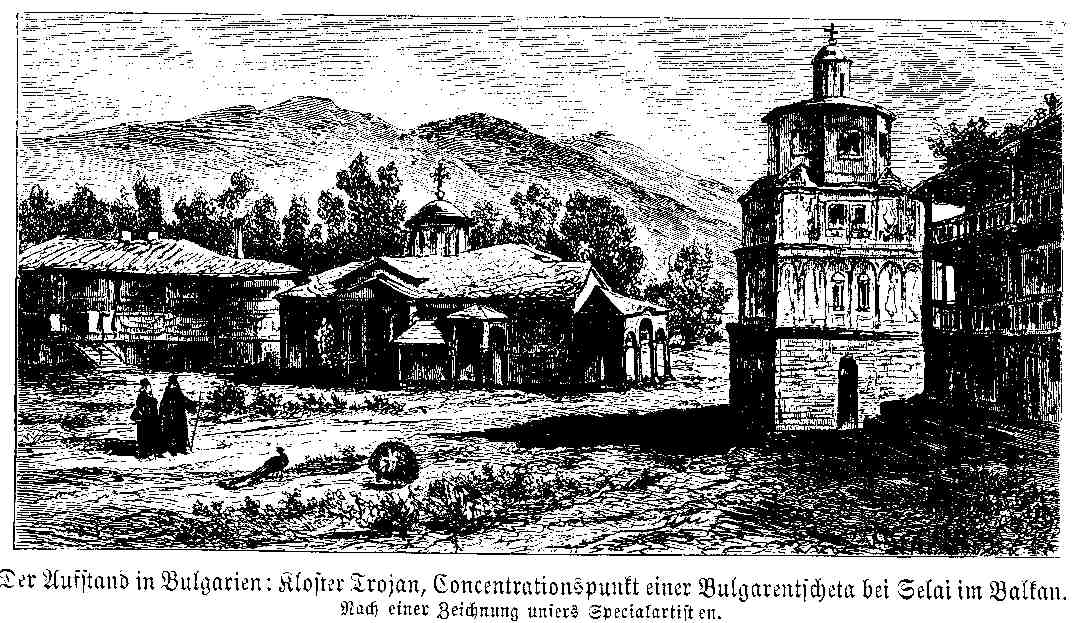
An 1876 drawing of the monastery

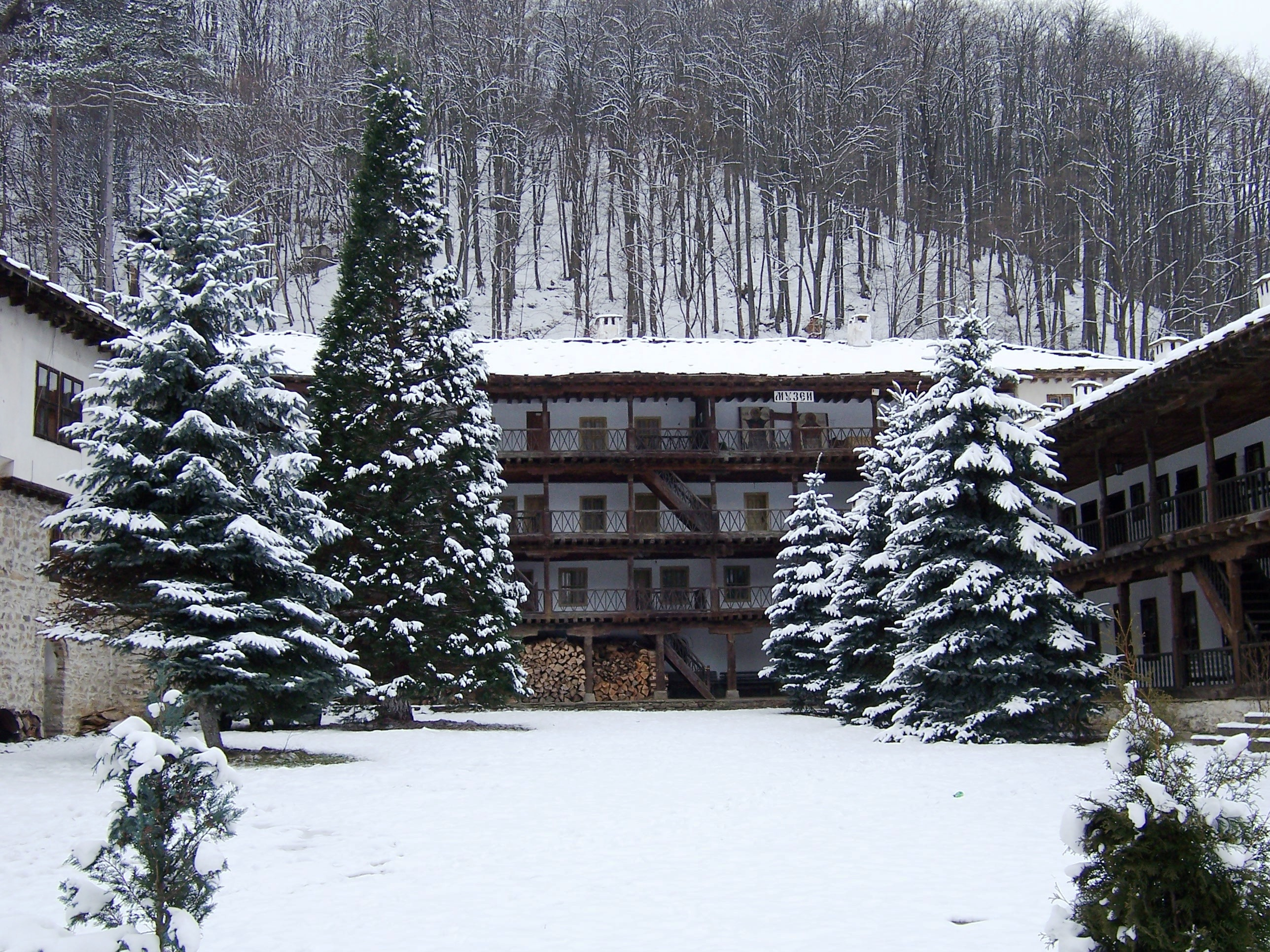
The courtyard inside the monastery

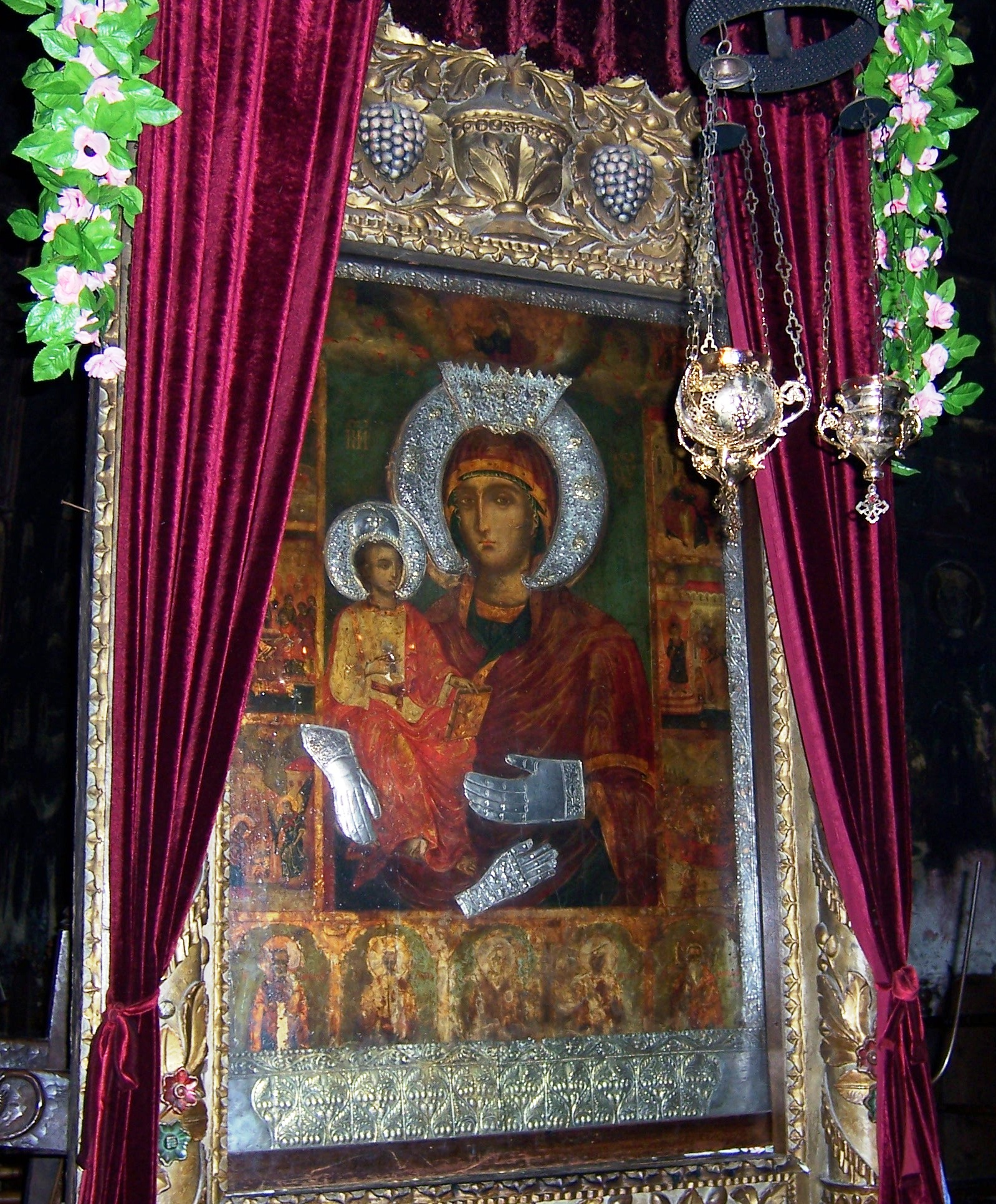
The Three-Handed Virgin icon

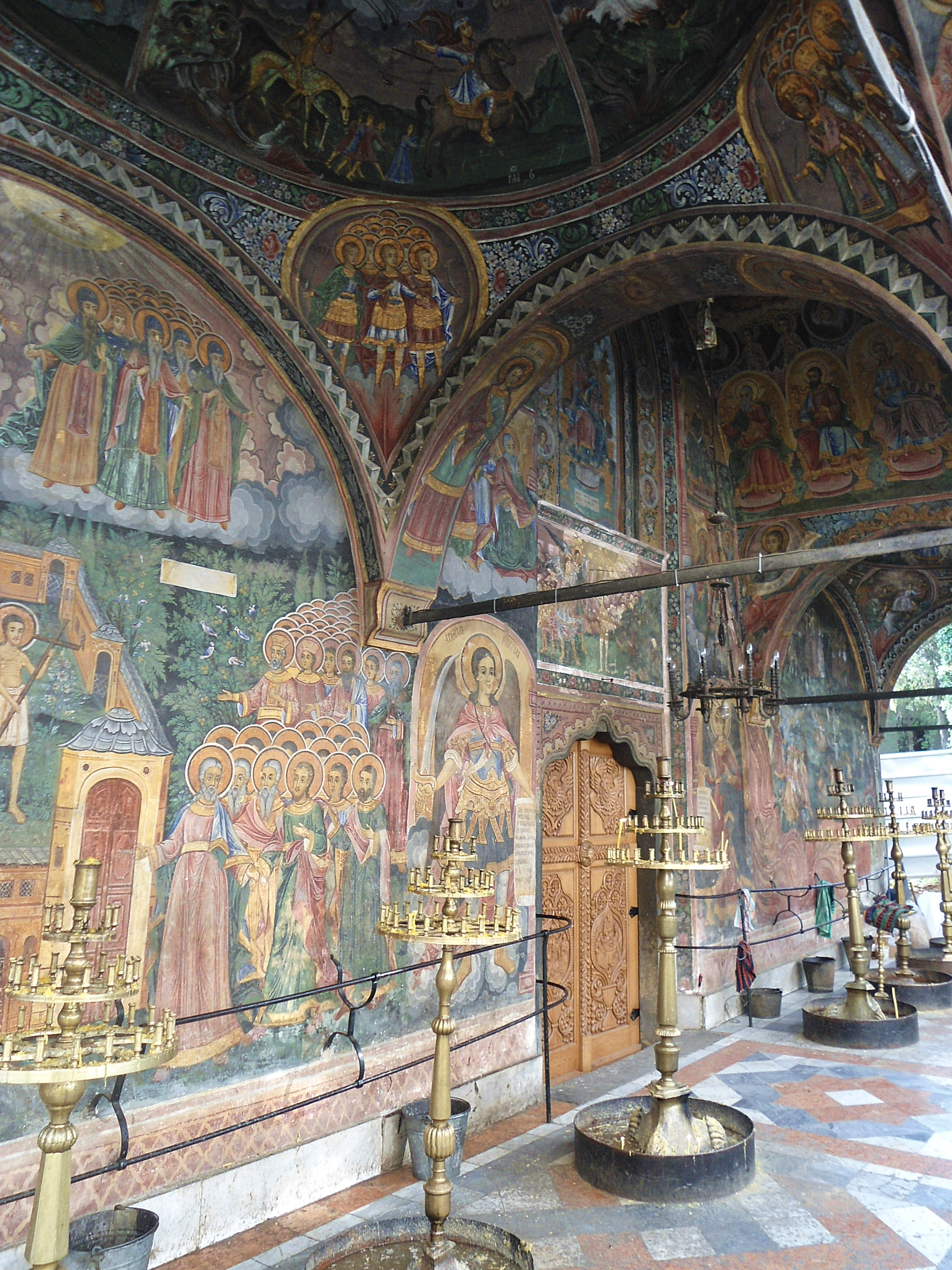
Mural paintings on the church "Holy Mother of God" (in the monastery)

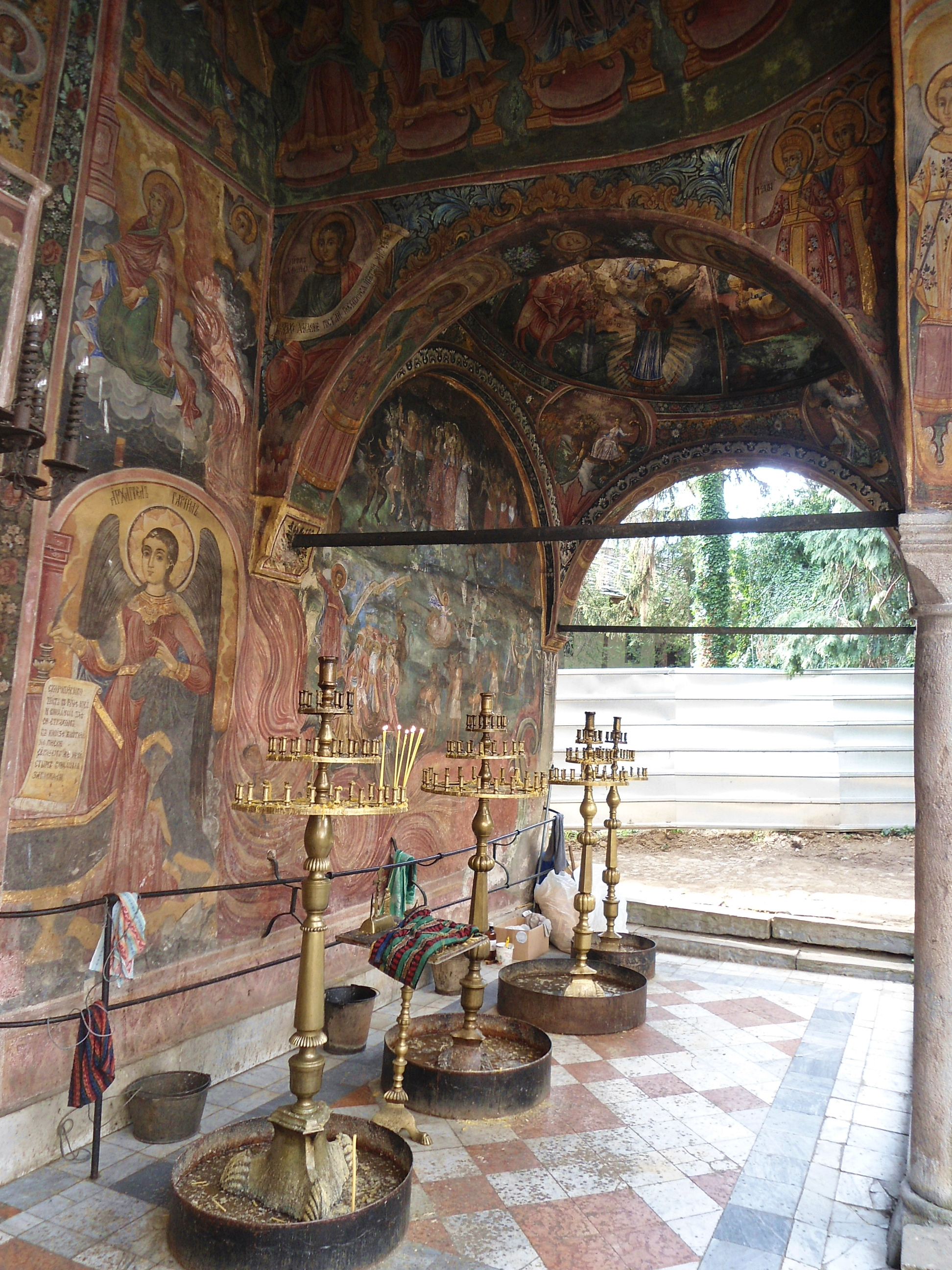
Another example of mural paintings

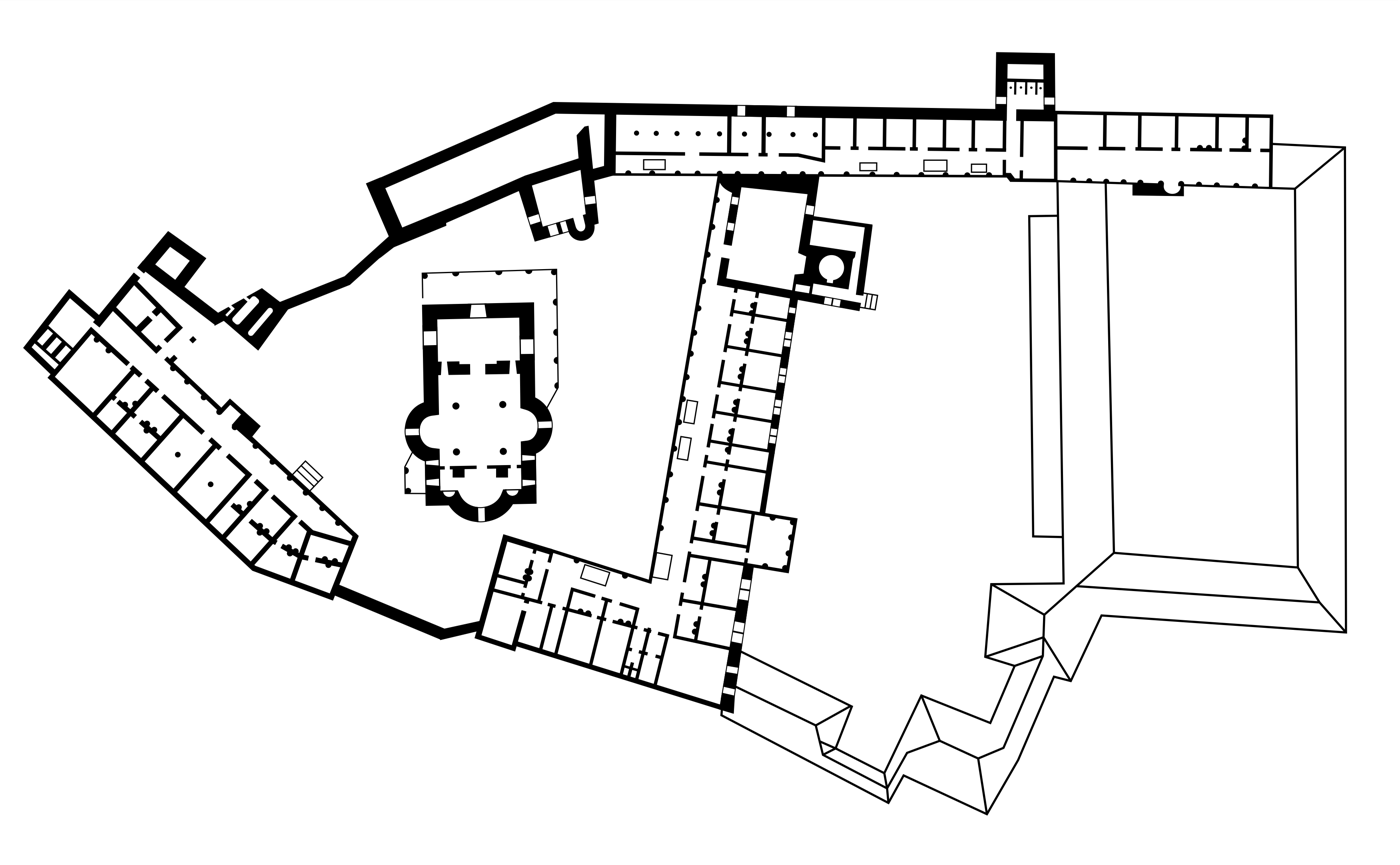
Plan
