= Cyril of Bulgaria =

Patriarch of Bulgaria and Righteous Among the Nations (1901–1971)

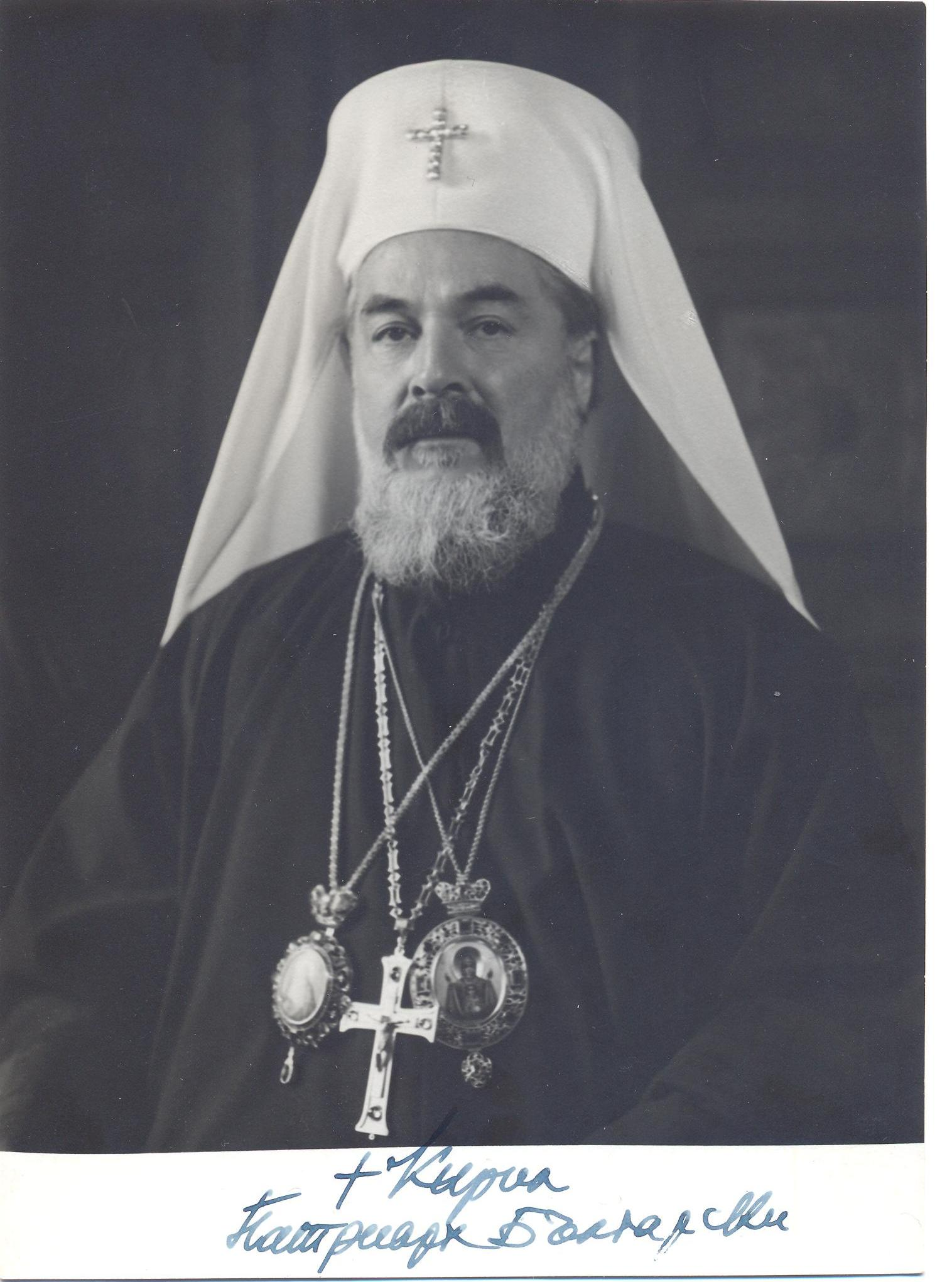

Patriarch Cyril (Bulgarian: Патриарх Кирил; secular name Konstantin Markov Konstantinov [Bulgarian: Константин Марков Константинов]; January 3, 1901 – March 7, 1971) was the first Patriarch of the restored Bulgarian Patriarchate.

Born in Sofia, Bulgaria, to a family of Aromanian descent, he adopted his religious name of Cyril in the St. Nedelya Church on December 30, 1923 and became Metropolitan of Plovdiv in 1938.

On May 10, 1953 Cyril was elected Patriarch of Bulgaria, holding the position until his death.

Cyril was buried in the main church of the Bachkovo Monastery, 189 kilometres from Sofia.

Cyril's historical role in the Bulgarian popular resistance to the Holocaust is recounted in the oratorio A Melancholy Beauty, composed by Georgi Andreev with libretto by Scott Cairns and Aryeh Finklestein. The text describes "Metropolitan Kyril" in 1943 confronting the captors of Bulgarian Jews slated to be deported. Kyril first pledged to go with the deportees in solidarity and then told the guards he will block the train with his own body. The guards replied that they have just received new orders to release the Jews.

For his work in saving Jews, Cyril, as well as Stefan I of Bulgaria, were recognized by Yad Vashem as the Righteous Among the Nations in 2001.

Cyril was succeeded by Maxim of Bulgaria.

Preceded by Office restored	Patriarch of Bulgaria; 1953–1971	Succeeded by Patriarch Maxim
