= Patleina Monastery =

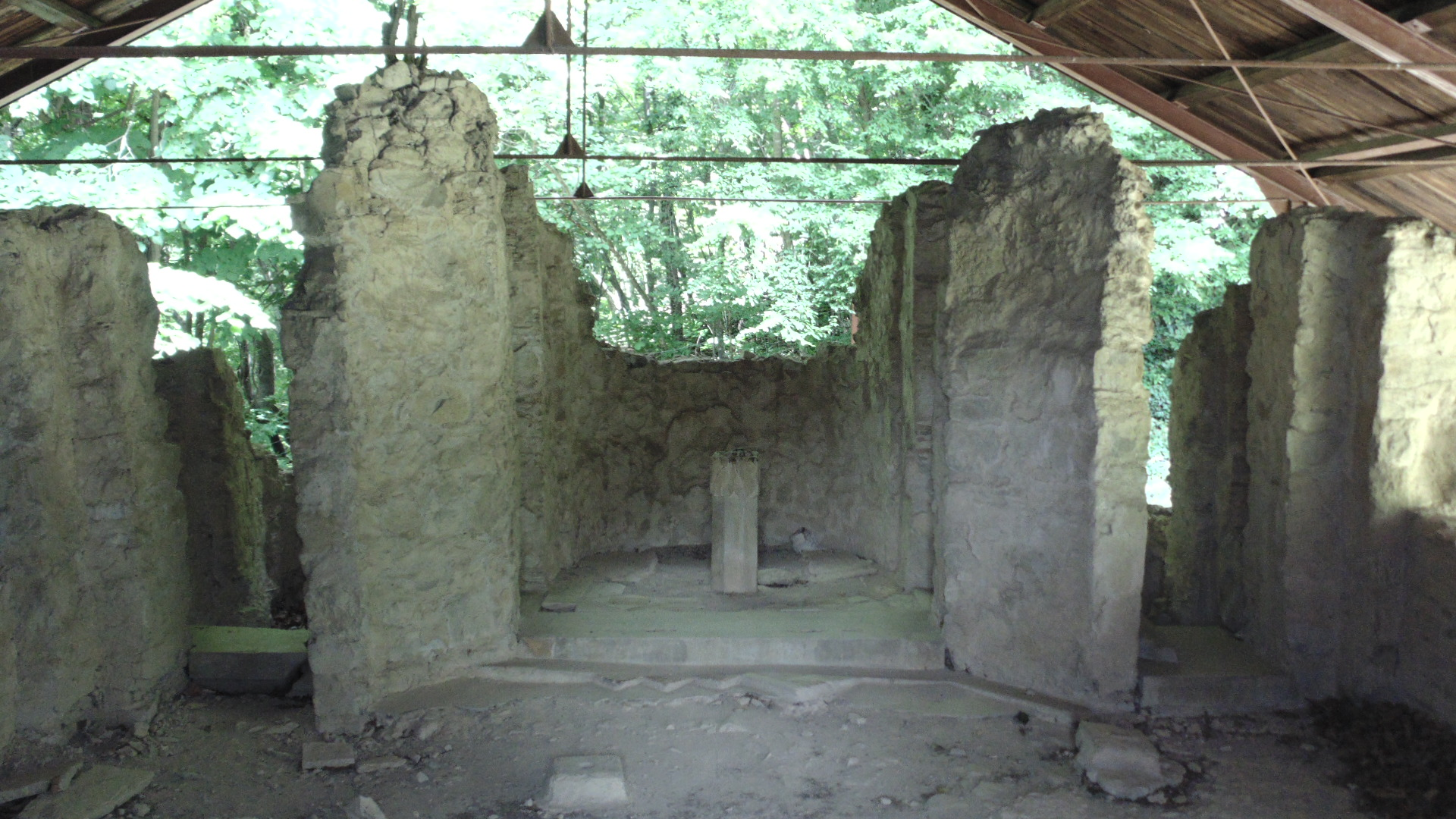

- Location within Bulgaria
- Interactive map of Patleina Monastery

Monastery information
- Other name: Patleina Monastery of Saint Pantaleon
- Established: 9th century

Site
- Location: Veliki Preslav, Veliki Preslav Municipality, Shumen Province
- Coordinates: 43°7′36.7″N 26°49′22.2″E

The Patleina Monastery of Saint Pantaleon (Bulgarian: Патлейнският манастир „Свети Пантелеймон“) is a ruined Bulgarian Orthodox monastery. It is an archaeological site situated at the outskirts of the capital of the First Bulgarian Empire, Preslav. At its heyday in the 9th and 10th centuries, the monastery was among the leading centres of the Preslav Literary School, as well as one of the most prominent centres of production of painted decorative ceramics.

== Location ==
The monastery is situated high on the right bank of the Golyama Kamchiya River within the territory of the Patleina Reserve in Dragoevska Mountain at the foothills of the eastern section of the Balkan Mountains. It is located about 6 km south of the town of Veliki Preslav and 2.5 km from the outside fortress walls of the old city.

== History ==
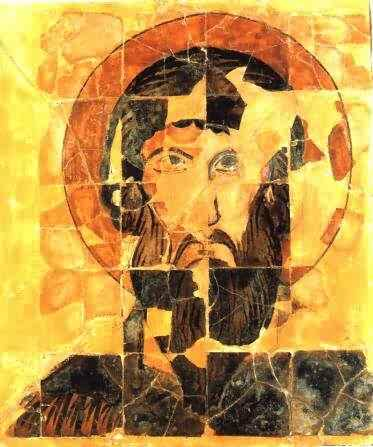
The renowned icon of Saint Theodore Stratelates discovered at the monastery

The monastery was established after the Christianization of Bulgaria in the 9th century during the reign of Boris I (r. 852–889). It was destroyed in 971 by the Byzantines when they seized Preslav in the aftermath of the Sviatoslav's invasion of Bulgaria and was repeatedly plundered and devastated by the Pechenegs and the Cumans in the 11th and 12th centuries during the Byzantine rule of Bulgaria. According to researchers, the monastery was an important literary centre during the First Bulgarian Empire and of the most important sites of the Preslav Literary School, there the disciples of the Saints Cyril and Methodius, Clement of Ohrid and Naum of Preslav had worked.

The Patleina Monastery was also an artistic-production centre. During the excavations of the site carried out between 1909 and 1914, a 10th-century mosaic ceramic icon of Saint Theodore Stratelates was discovered. It has since become one of the symbols of the medieval Bulgarian heritage and is now kept at the National Archaeological Museum. Other artefacts dates from the 9th and 10th centuries excavated at the site include ceramic icons of Saint Philip and Mark the Evangelist, crucifixes, a bronze matrix of an icon of blessing Christ sitting on a throne. The monastery was declared a monument of culture.

In the 1940s a new monastery was constructed on the slope over the medieval site. However, it was never consecrated as it was nationalised after 1944 by the new Socialist authorities and converted into a vacation home.

== Description ==
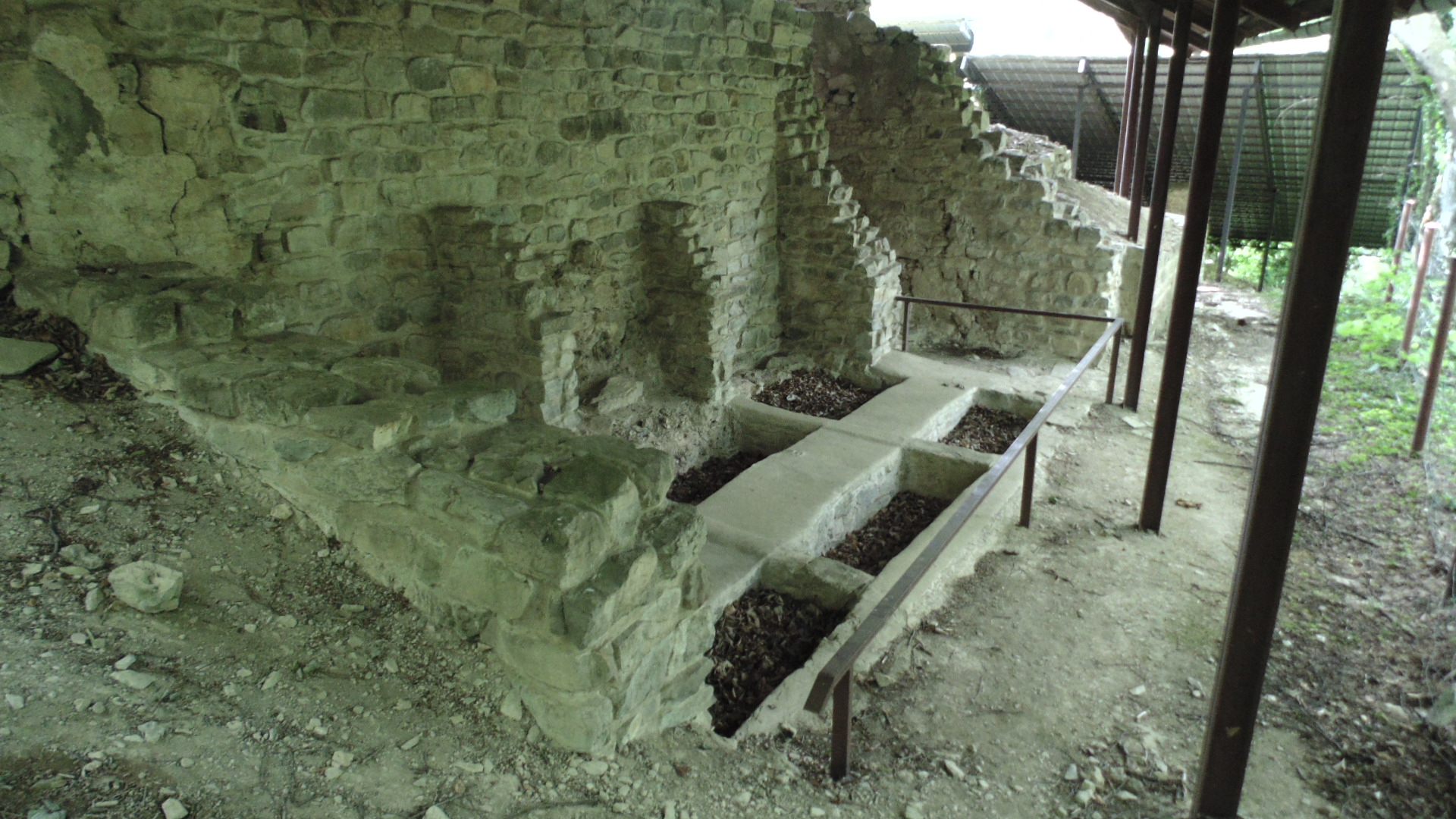
A view to the crypt

The Patleina Monastery is ruined. The complex included of cross-shaped church, residential and commercial buildings. The edifices are set on a narrow terrace at the foot of a steep mountain slope overgrown with linden, hornbeam and oak trees. There are three courtyards – one for prayer, one facing the residential building and one with ceramic and glass workshops. The church with the residential quarters south of it occupied the western part of the terrace; the rest of the buildings used to against the slopes from the west and north. A few metres to the north of the church was the monastery crypt consisting of six burial chambers.

The church had been refurbished. It was originally cross-domed with a narthex and an apse and a total length of 12.60 m. After the reconstruction, the side walls are reinforced. There were two lateral apses next to the altar, was well was two rectangular premises adjacent to the western façade. The interior of the church was richly decorated with marble plinths with ornamental friezes. The cladding on the walls was of painted ceramic tiles; the floor was covered in multicoloured mosaics.

There were two isolated buildings were the painted ceramics workshops were housed. There used to be ovens at the northern part of the courtyard, as well as a facility used for flushing and purification of the raw material for the ceramics – the white Preslav clay with high-quality plastic properties.

== See also ==
- First Bulgarian Empire
- Preslav Literary School
- Veliki Preslav
