= Council of Preslav =

The People's Council of Preslav (Bulgarian: Преславски народен събор) took place in 893. It was among the most important events in the history of the First Bulgarian Empire and was a cornerstone of the Christianization of Bulgaria under prince Boris I.

== Background and sources ==
In 889 Boris I abdicated and retired to a monastery and was succeeded by his eldest son Vladimir-Rasate who tried to restore Tengrism, the traditional religion of the country since 681. After Vladimir-Rasate was deposed by his father in 893, the latter gathered a People's Council in Preslav to legitimize the changes. Since the issues to be discussed were of great importance for the whole country, the attendance and approval of the higher and lower nobility, the clergy and representatives of all provinces was needed. There is no direct mention of the Council in medieval sources. The most detailed description of the events that led to the downfall of Vladimir-Rasate comes from the Benedictine abbot Regino of Prüm in his work Chronicon:

...The Prince of that people [Boris I], as they say, after accepting the blessing of Baptism, showed such a perfection, that during the day he appeared to his people in kingly garments and during the night, covered in crude clothes entered secretly in the church and lying on the floor of the temple, he spent his time in prayer, putting only sackcloth below. Soon he left the earthly kingdom and after he put into his place as a Prince his eldest son [Vladimir], he tonsured, took the garment of the holy asceticism and became a monk, dedicating his day and night to charity, vigil and prayers. In the meanwhile, his son whom he placed for Prince and who was by far less zealous and active than his father, began to plunder and spend his time in drinking, feasts and debauchery and with all means to turn his newly baptized people back to the pagan rituals. When his father learned that, inflamed by great anger took off his monastic clothes, put again the military sash, put on the royal garments and when he took those who feared God, set against his son. Soon he captured him without much difficulty, pulled out his eyes and sent him in prison. Then he gathered his whole empire and placed for Prince his younger son [Simeon I], and threatened him before everyone with the same punishment if he would betray the true Christianity. After he thus arranged that, he took off the sash, put on the holy monastic clothes and when he went to a monastery, he spend the rest of the time of his present life in holy asceticism.

== Decisions ==
According to the historians the council was presided by Boris I and four major decisions were taken:

- Prince Vladimir-Rasate was dethroned and replaced by his brother Simeon I. Simeon, who was intended to be a high-ranking cleric or even Archbishop, was released from his monastic oath. There was also a change in the principle of succession which allowed the brother of the monarch to succeed him. Up to that time only the first-born son of the monarch was able to succeed him on the throne. That change was mentioned by John the Exarch in his work Shestodnev.
- The capital of Bulgaria was moved from Pliska to Preslav. That decision is explained with the desire of Boris I to select a capital away from Pliska where the memory of the heathen past was still very strong. In the new capital Simeon would have been surrounded by people loyal to Christianity and the pro-Slavic policy of his father. Preslav was also the site of the Panteleimon Monastery where Boris I had retired and where Simeon himself might have resided. Andreev suggests that placing the capital in Preslav was a symbolic act of breaking with paganism.
- The Byzantine clergy was to be banished from the country and replaced with Bulgarian clerics. Among the newly appointed Bulgarian bishops was Clement of Ohrid who was sent to Devol in the region of Kutmichevitsa.
- The Old Bulgarian language was to replace the Greek in liturgy. Thus it became the official language of Bulgaria. That act was of great importance not only for Bulgaria but for the whole Slavic world.

== Significance ==
The decisions taken during the Council of Preslav had a great impact on Bulgarian history. The official status of Old Bulgarian gave great impetus for the development of the Preslav and Ohrid Literary Schools. The Bulgarian culture and literature entered its Golden Age under the rule of the newly elected Simeon I and the country became the cultural and spiritual center of Slavic Europe. The removal of the Byzantine clergy and the Greek language from the liturgy ensured that Bulgaria would stay away from any strong or direct Byzantine influence in its policy and religious life.

The Byzantine reaction was quick. As soon as 894 emperor Leo VI moved the market of the Bulgarian merchants from Constantinople to Salonica which was a heavy blow to the Bulgarian economic interests. This inflamed the first commercial war in Europe won by Simeon I after the decisive battle of Boulgarophygon in 896.

== Notes ==
a: The People's Council existed since the creation of Bulgaria and included in its original form the whole "armed people" led by the boils. It was a higher authority than the Khan, which can be illustrated with the Council of 766 when khan Sabin was deposed. The People's Council began to lose importance with the centralization of the country under Krum and Omurtag and especially after the Christianization when the monarch was considered the representative of God on the earth.

== Sources ==
- Andreev, Jordan; Milcho Lalkov (1996). The Bulgarian Khans and Tsars (in Bulgarian). Veliko Tarnovo: Abagar. ISBN 954-427-216-X.
- Bakalov, Georgi; Milen Kumanov (2003). "KUTMICHEVITSA (Kutmichinitsa)". History of Bulgaria electronic edition (in Bulgarian). Sofia: Trud, Sirma. ISBN 954528613X.
- Duychev, Ivan; collective (1960). Latin Sources for Bulgarian History (LIBI), volume II (in Bulgarian and Latin). Sofia: Izdatelstvo na BAN.
- Lalkov, Milcho (1997). "Tsar Simeon the Great (893–927)". Rulers of Bulgaria. Kibea. ISBN 954-474-098-8.
- Runciman, Steven (1930). "The Two Eagles". A History of the First Bulgarian Empire. London: George Bell & Sons. OCLC 832687.
- Zlatarski, Vasil (1971) [1927]. History of the Bulgarian state in the Middle Ages. Volume I. History of the First Bulgarian Empire (in Bulgarian) (2 ed.). Sofia: Nauka i izkustvo. OCLC 67080314.
  - "Part I. From the Slavianization to the Fall of the First Empire (852-1018); III. Nationalization of the Bulgarian State; 5. Internal Policy of Prince Boris I". V. Zlatarski - Istorija 1 B - 3.5.
  - "Part I. From the Slavianization to the Fall of the First Empire (852-1018); IV. Struggle with Byzantium for Political Supremacy; 1. Emperor Simeon and his first war with Byzantium". V. Zlatarski - Istorija 1 B - 4.1.
- Николов, А., Факти и догадки за събора през 893 година. - В: България в световното културно наследство. Материали от Третата национална конференция по история, археология и културен туризъм "Пътуване към България" - Шумен, 17-19. 05. 2012 г. Съст. Т. Тодоров. Шумен, 2014, 229-237
