= Anna (daughter of Boris I) =

Anna of Bulgaria
- Died: 9 October (year unknown); Preslav, Bulgaria
- Spouse: tarkan Simeon
- House: Krum's dynasty
- Father: Boris I of Bulgaria
- Mother: Maria

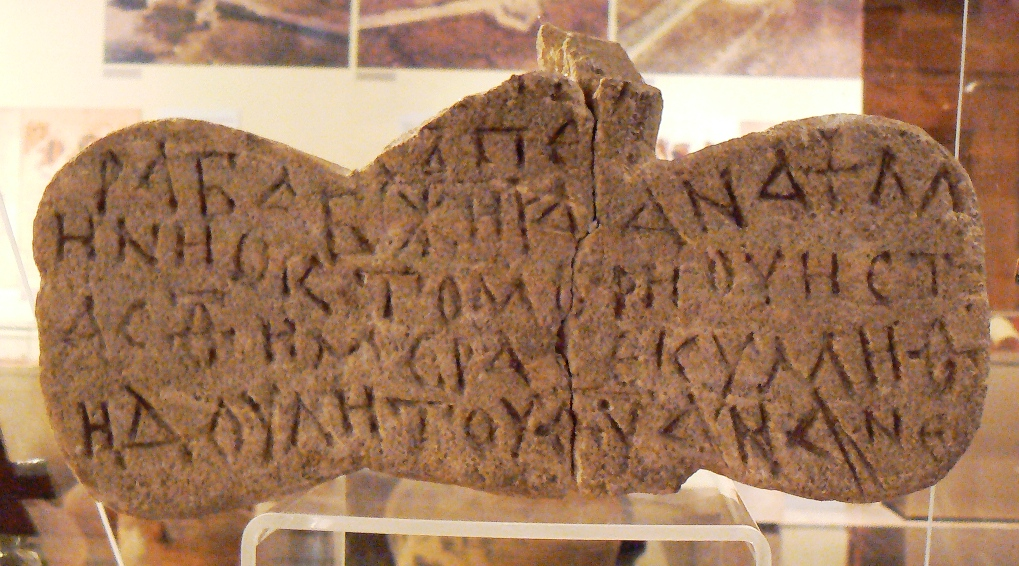
Replica of the bilingual tombstone of Anna from Preslav

Anna (Bulgarian: Анна; 9th–10th century) was a Bulgarian princess and a daughter of Prince Boris I of Bulgaria (852–889).

Anna was Boris's second daughter and the youngest of six children born to his second consort, Maria, which also included the rulers Prince Vladimir (r. 889–893) and Tsar Simeon the Great (r. 893–927), the princes Gabriel and Jacob and the princess Eupraxia. Anna bears the name of Boris's sister.

Anna married the tarkan Simeon, an influential figure in the Bulgarian state. Like her older sister Eupraxia, Anna became a nun at a monastery in the Bulgarian capital Preslav later in her life.

Her tombstone, unearthed in 1965 and written in Old Bulgarian and Medieval Greek, reveals that she died as a nun on 9 October of an uncertain year. The reverse side of the stone features a portrait of the princess in a loose-fitting garment, pointing her arms sideways towards a cross-domed church on each side and holding a sceptre in her right hand. Based on this portrait, it is highly likely that Anna was a ktetor of two churches.

In the 1985 Bulgarian feature film Boris I, the role of Princess Anna is played by the actress Adriana Petrova.
