= Varna Monastery =

Medieval monastery complex, Bulgaria

Architectural drawing of the Royal Monastery of the Holy Mother of God — Varna

Varna Monastery is a large preserved early medieval monastery complex, opened near Varna, Bulgaria, with the status of a cultural monument of national importance for Bulgaria since 2015.

== History ==
Varna Monastery, the Royal Monastery of the Holy Mother of God - Varna, dates from the 9th century and probably as the Ravna Monastery was burnt by the Pechenegs during the invasions of the Bulgarian Lands in the 11th century, and according to other sources, it existed until the 18th century or until the beginning of the Bulgarian Revival.

Found by Karel Shkorpil in 1921 on the Franga Plateau just above the city itself. Located in the most appropriate location on the plateau with view and water source.

Studied in detail from 1996 until today by students in the specialty "archeology" at the Veliko Tarnovo University, as well as from the UK, Russia, Germany and Italy.

A cathedral church, a chapel tower, a huge scriptorium, a library, a school, a monastic dormitory, a holy shrine were found, and among the finds are an altar table, a blacksmith's workshop and coins – Bulgarian, Raška, Venetian, Byzantine, Ottoman. The buildings are filled with a opus mixtum, which construction equipment is used mainly for representative buildings, for example, the Great Basilica, Pliska.

In the area of the monastery was found the seal of Boris I of Bulgaria, two lead seals of Tsar Simeon the Great and the seal of Tsar Peter I of Bulgaria.

The Varna Monastery and the Ravna Monastery are considered the most significant literary centers of the Preslav Literary School outside the capitals Pliska and Preslav. The patron of the monastery is the Mother of God, who is also the patron saint of the city of Varna.

== Gallery ==
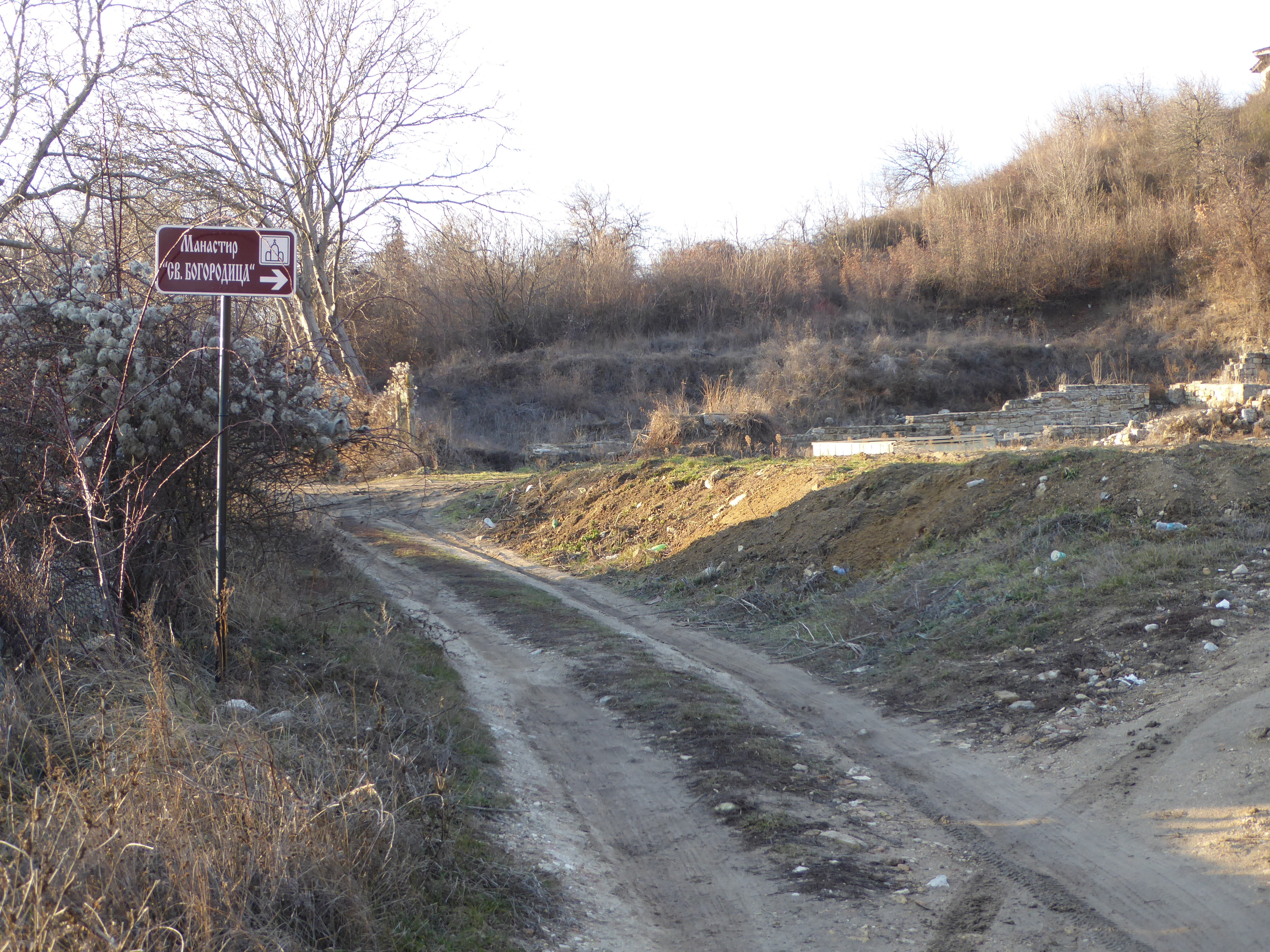
The signboard

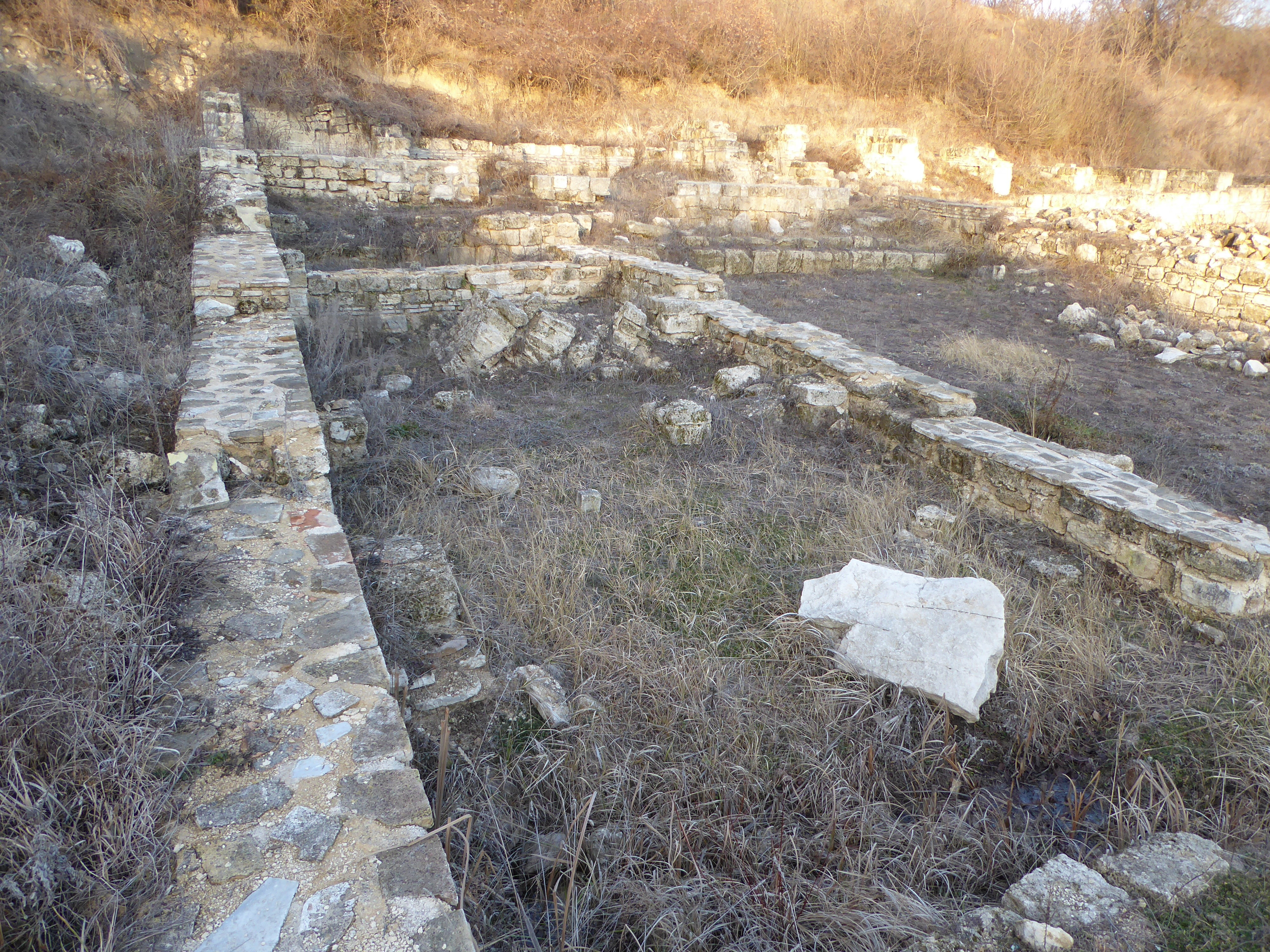
Ruins

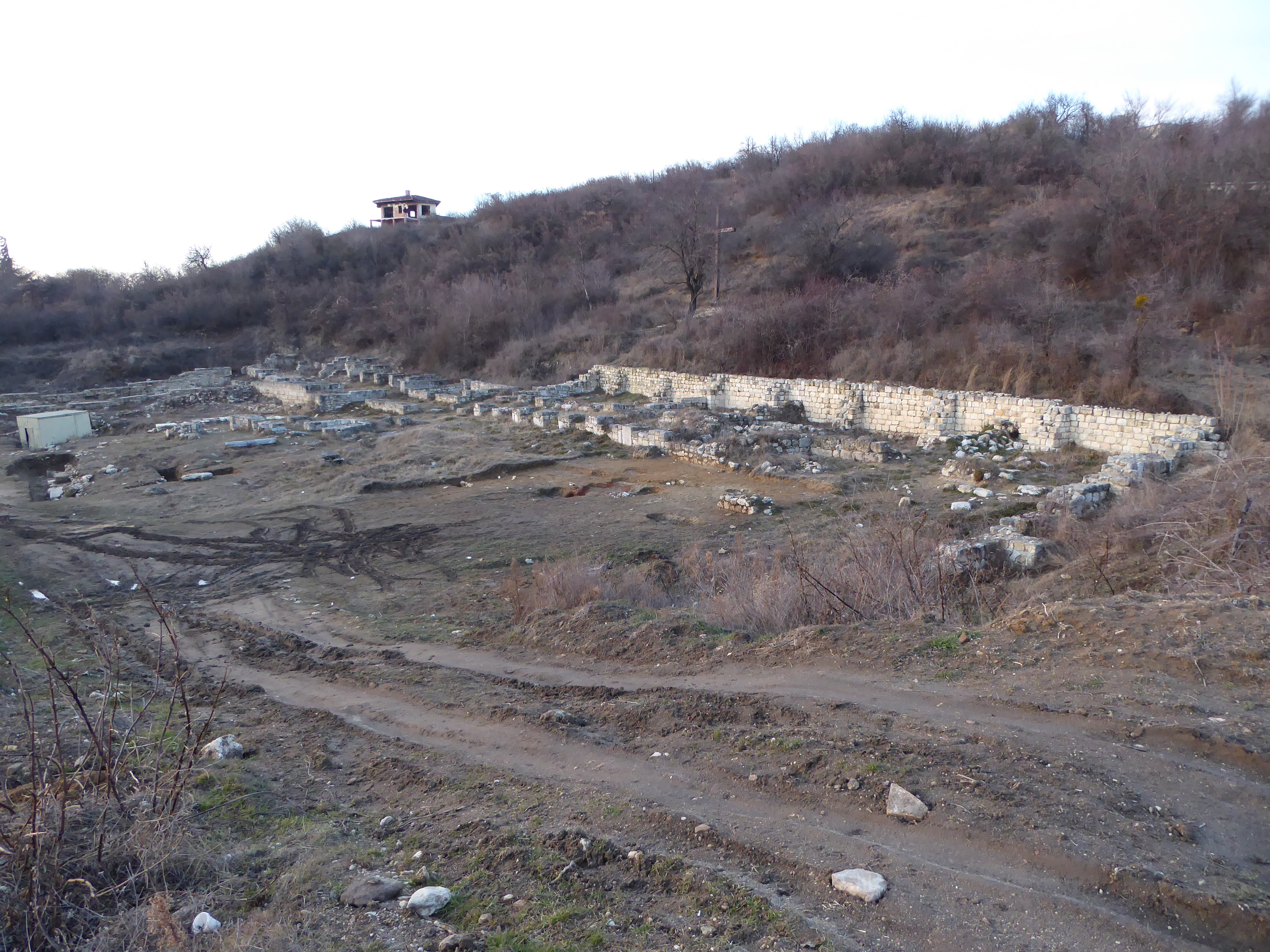
Ruins with the 2015 Memorial Cross

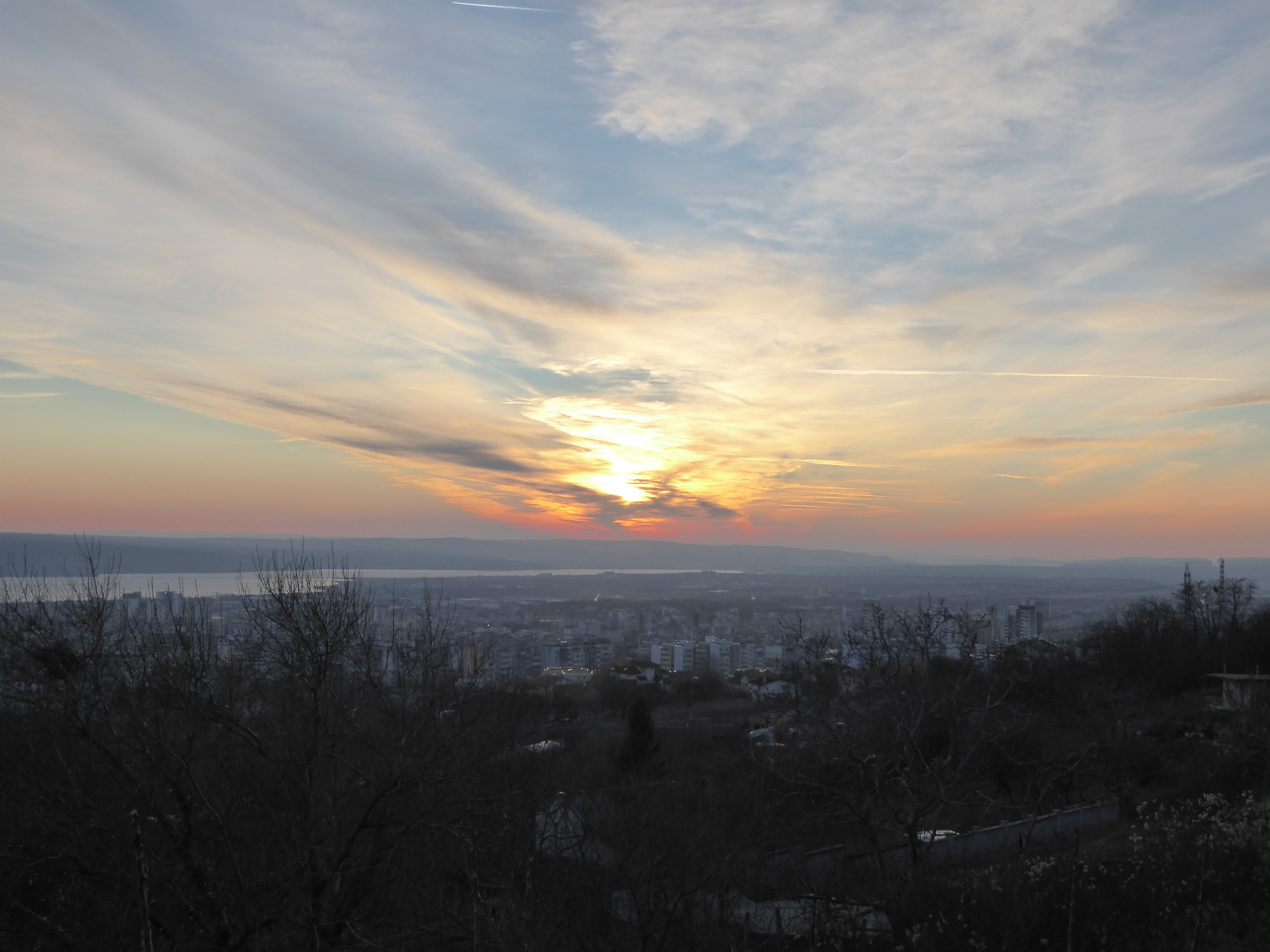
View of Varna Lake

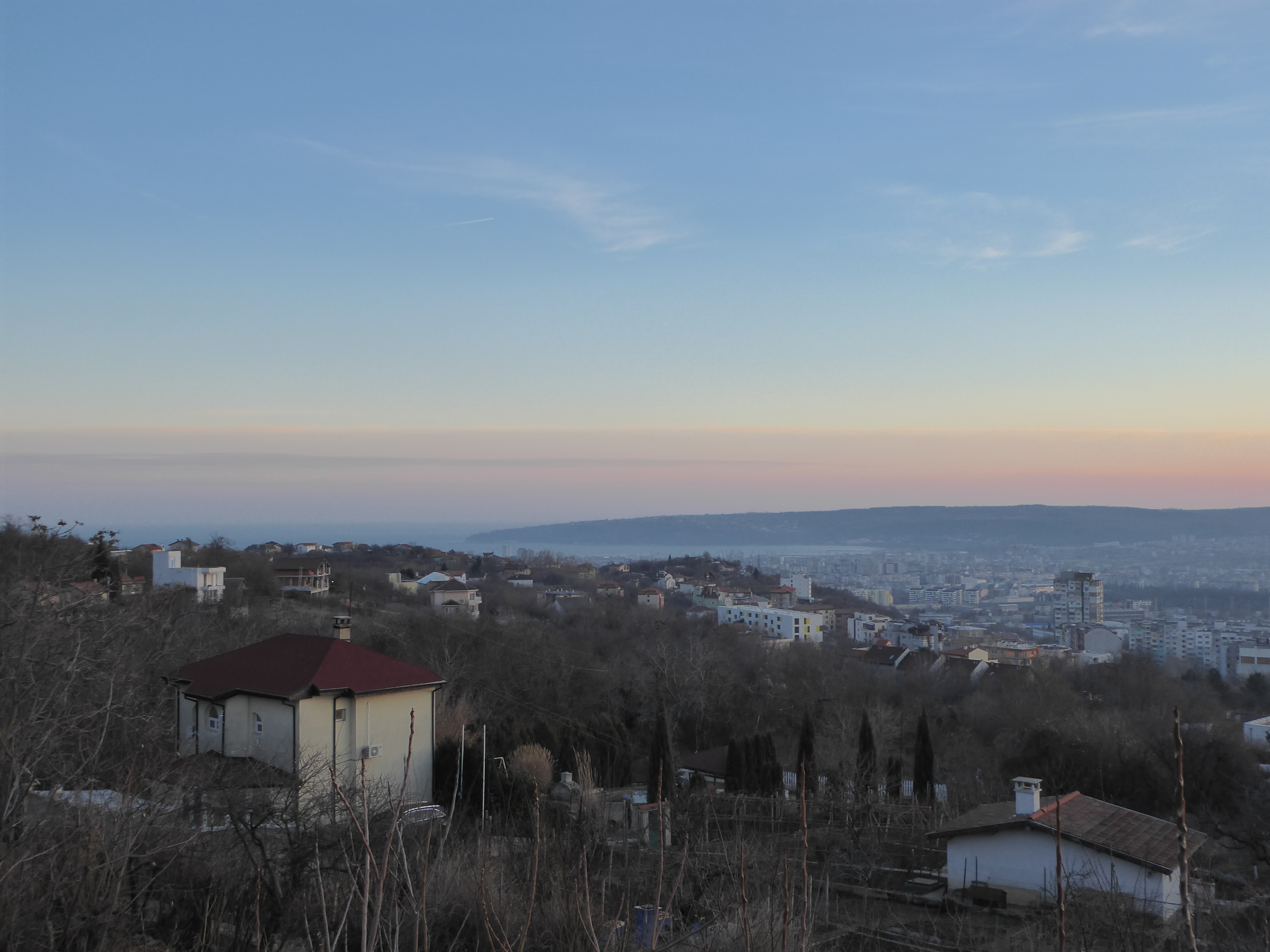
View of Varna from the bay

== See also ==
- Varna Necropolis
- Golden Age of Bulgaria
- Battle of Varna
- Asparuhov Bridge
