= Croatian–Bulgarian battle of 852 =

Part of the Croatian–Bulgarian wars

- Part of the Croatian–Bulgarian wars
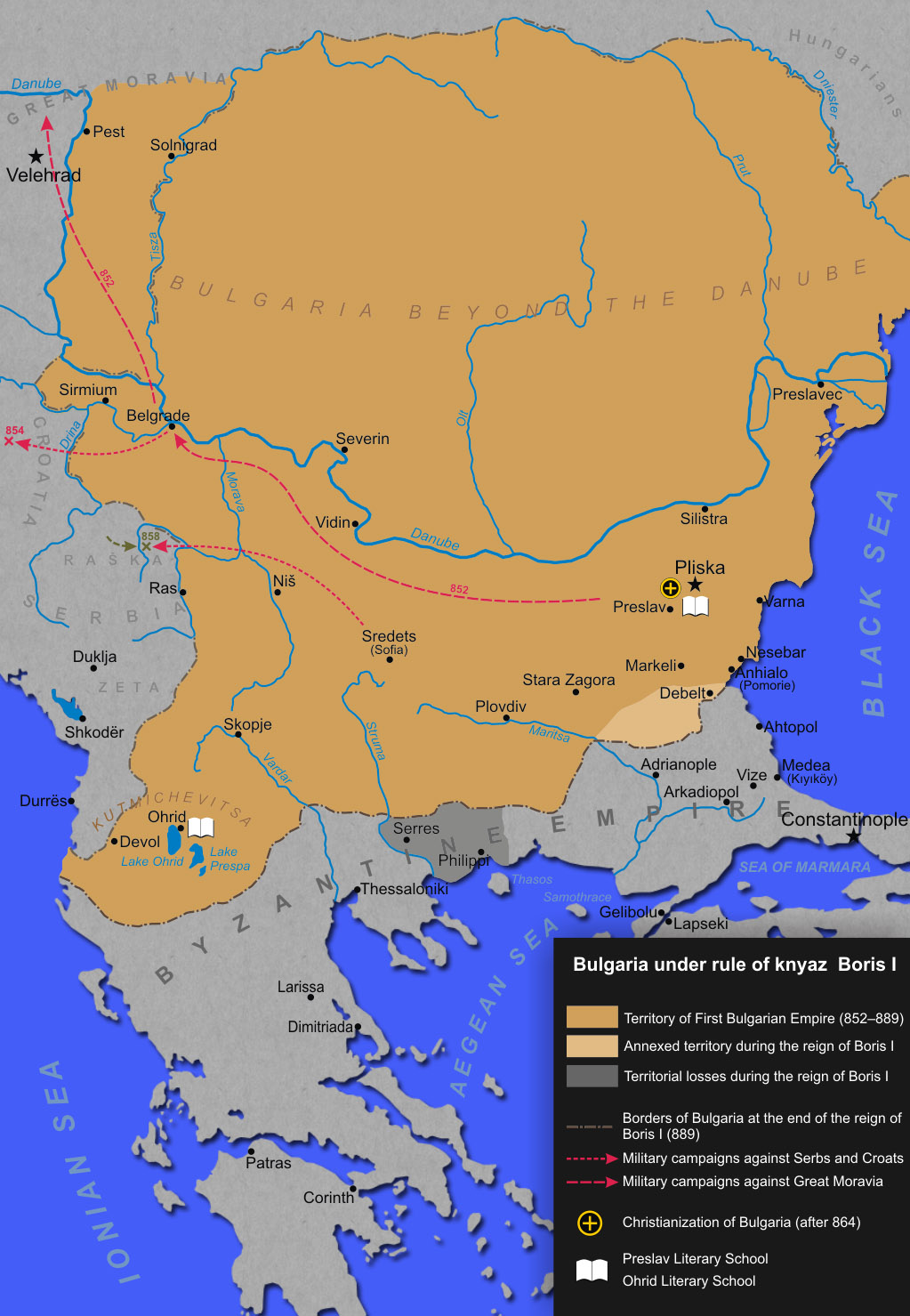
- Bulgaria under rule of knyaz Boris I and 852 campaign against Croatia (middle-left)
Date	852
Location	Vicinity of the Croatian–Bulgarian border in present-day eastern Bosnia and Herzegovina)
Result	Indecisive: Final Bulgarian retreat; Peace treaty concluded

Belligerents
Duchy of Croatia	First Bulgarian Empire

Commanders and leaders
Trpimir I of Croatia	Boris I of Bulgaria

Strength
Unknown	Unknown

Casualties and losses
Unknown	Unknown

Croatian–Bulgarian battle of 852 was the first known military conflict between the armies of Bulgaria (from 913 Bulgarian Empire), under the rule of Boris I, and the Duchy of Littoral Croatia, ruled by Duke Trpimir I, during the First Croatian-Bulgarian War. It was fought on the Croatian territory in the vicinity of the Croatian–Bulgarian border in present-day northeastern Bosnia and Herzegovina. Neither of the two warring sides emerged victorious, Bulgarian forces then retreated and finally both parties subsequently concluded a peace treaty.

== Background ==
In the middle of the 9th century, Bulgaria was a powerful country in the central and eastern Balkans. The Bulgarian ruler Boris I from Krum's dynasty made an alliance with the Moravian Prince Rastislav to strengthen his position against King Louis II of Germany, the ruler of East Francia. On the other side, Duke Trpimir I of Croatia was a faithful Frankish vassal. Between 846 and 848, he occasionally but effectively fought against the Byzantine Empire and the Republic of Venice both on land and sea.

Bulgarian khan Boris attacked the Croats in 852, and Trpimir negotiated a favorable peace afterwards.

Bulgaria's ongoing expansion to the west reached Croatian borders. Bulgarian forces invaded Croatia in 852 in northeastern Bosnia, where Croatia and Bulgaria bordered at the time.

== Battle and aftermath ==
According to available sources, there was only one major battle between the Bulgarian army and the Croatian forces. Sources say that the invading army led by the powerful Bulgarian Khan Boris I fought Duke Trpimir's forces on the mountainous territory of present-day northeastern Bosnia and Herzegovina in 852.

The exact place and time of the battle is not known due to the lack of contemporary accounts of the battle. Neither the Bulgarian nor the Croatian side emerged victorious. Very soon afterward, both Boris of Bulgaria and Trpimir of Croatia turned to diplomacy and reached a peace treaty. Negotiations resulted in a long-term establishment of peace with the border between the Duchy of Croatia and the Bulgarian Khanate stabilized at the Drina River (between modern-day Bosnia and Herzegovina and the Republic of Serbia).

Trpimir later fought the Bulgarians in northeastern Bosnia in 855 and defeated them.

== Aftermath ==
Bulgaria later had an unsuccessful war against Serbia in 853 or 854.

The situation changed only when Simeon I, Bulgarian Tsar, started a new war against the Byzantine Empire and Croatia as well, by the end of the 9th century and in the first quarter of the 10th century, which ended with Simeon's death in 927.

== See also ==
- Croatian–Bulgarian wars
- Old Great Bulgaria
- Timeline of Croatian history
- List of rulers of Croatia
- List of Bulgarian monarchs
- Medieval Bulgarian army
- History of Croatia
- History of Bulgaria
- Transdanubian Bulgaria
- Byzantine–Bulgarian wars
