= Peter (diplomat) =

Bulgarian noble

- kavhan (?)
- Born: 9th century
- Died: 9th century
- Noble family: Krum's dynasty

Peter (Church Slavonic: Петръ Bulgarian: Петър) (fl. 860s–870s) was a Bulgarian noble and relative of "knyaz" (khan) Boris I (r. 852–889) who was in charge of diplomatic missions during the Christianization of Bulgaria. His position in the Bulgarian administrative hierarchy is unknown but it has been suggested that he had the title kavhan, i. e. the second person in the state after the monarch.

== Historical background ==
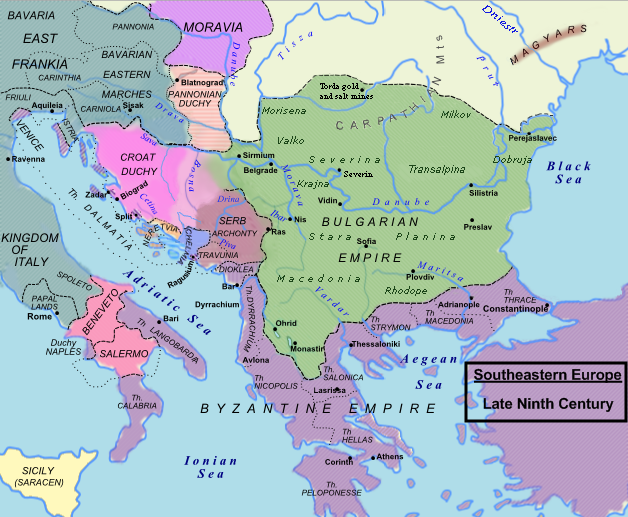
Map of Bulgaria in the 860s.

When Boris I assumed the throne of Bulgaria in 852, the country was still pagan, with the ruling Bulgar elite being Tengriists while the Slavic population practised its own religion. Christianity was already widespread in Bulgaria as the country was established on former territories of the Byzantine Empire, and seems to have been influential. Even one of the sons of Khan Omurtag (r. 814–831), Enravota, converted to Christianity. The Bulgarian nobility was strongly opposed to any form of Byzantine influence in the country and was therefore hostile to Christianity as it was directly associated with the Byzantine Empire. Boris I, however, had many reasons to consider conversion — Bulgaria was situated between two powerful Christian empires, Byzantium and East Francia; Christian doctrine particularly favoured the position of the monarch as God's representative on Earth; and finally, Boris also saw Christianity as a way to overcome the differences between Bulgars and Slavs. The geopolitical situation in the mid 9th century was also favourable because of the increasing friction and rivalry between the Papacy in Rome and the Ecumenical Patriarchate of Constantinople for influence in Central Europe. That struggle between the two churches would give the Bulgarian ruler the opportunity to manoeuvre and negotiate with both, thus extracting favourable concessions while keeping the country out of direct foreign influence. When the Byzantines invaded Bulgaria in the autumn of 863 and demanded conversion to Christianity from Constantinople as the single condition to retreat, Boris I readily accepted and was baptised in the beginning of 864, assuming the Christian name Michael after his spiritual godfather, the Byzantine Emperor Michael III. That step was very unpopular among the nobility, but when they rebelled Boris I dealt decisively with them and executed 52 magnates along with their whole families. When in the following year the Byzantines sturdily demonstrated their determination not to allow the existence of an autocephalous Bulgarian Church, Boris I decided to turn to the Papacy.

== Missions to Rome ==
According to the historical sources there were three Bulgarian missions to the Pope with the participation of Peter, the first one being in the summer of 866. The interest of Boris I in the Roman Church was caused by the reluctance of the Ecumenical Patriarchate of Constantinople to accept his request to appoint an independent patriarch (or at least an archbishop) for the Bulgarian diocese in order to retain it subordinated to Constantinople. Boris I was determined to make Bulgaria Christian while keeping the country's religious and political independence. Since the end of the 850s the churches of Rome and Constantinople were in a period of a heated competition for influence over the Slavs and the Ecumenical Church power. This rivalry favoured Boris' plans, as it gave him the opportunity to play one side off against the other and choose. The new orientation of the Bulgarian policy also allowed Boris I to calm down the nobility of the boyars, which was cautious and hostile to the increased Byzantine influence in the country after the Christianization.

=== First mission ===
The first Bulgarian delegation arrived before Pope Nicholas I on 29 August 866 — the very same year during which Boris quelled the rebellion of the boyars against Christianization. Among the gifts presented to the Pope by the delegation was the weapon of Boris "with which [he] was armed when in the name of Christ he celebrated over his enemies". The Bulgarians also brought a document with questions by their ruler to the Pope. The content of the questions is reproduced on paragraph 106 of the "Answers of Pope Nicolas to the questions of the Bulgarians". The arrival of the Bulgarian envoys in Rome was a very important event. The Pope enthusiastically spread the news in a letter to Hincmar of Reims and the other archbishops of the Frankish Empire.

...When we were embarrassed from everywhere by those troubles and were troubled by great obstacles — there, we were all of a sudden informed that envoys of the already mentioned Bulgarian prince have arrived. Therefore who is the one, who can tell with what joy and what infinite rejoice we were filled, when we understood for their salvaging baptism due to the generosity of God's goodness and when we understood that they have sought for explanation of the teachings of Christ from the venerable apostle Peter, i. e. from his Holy See: they, even though were far away, remained close through the faith but also because we saw that an easy land route was revealed through their lands for our envoys to the land of the Greeks.

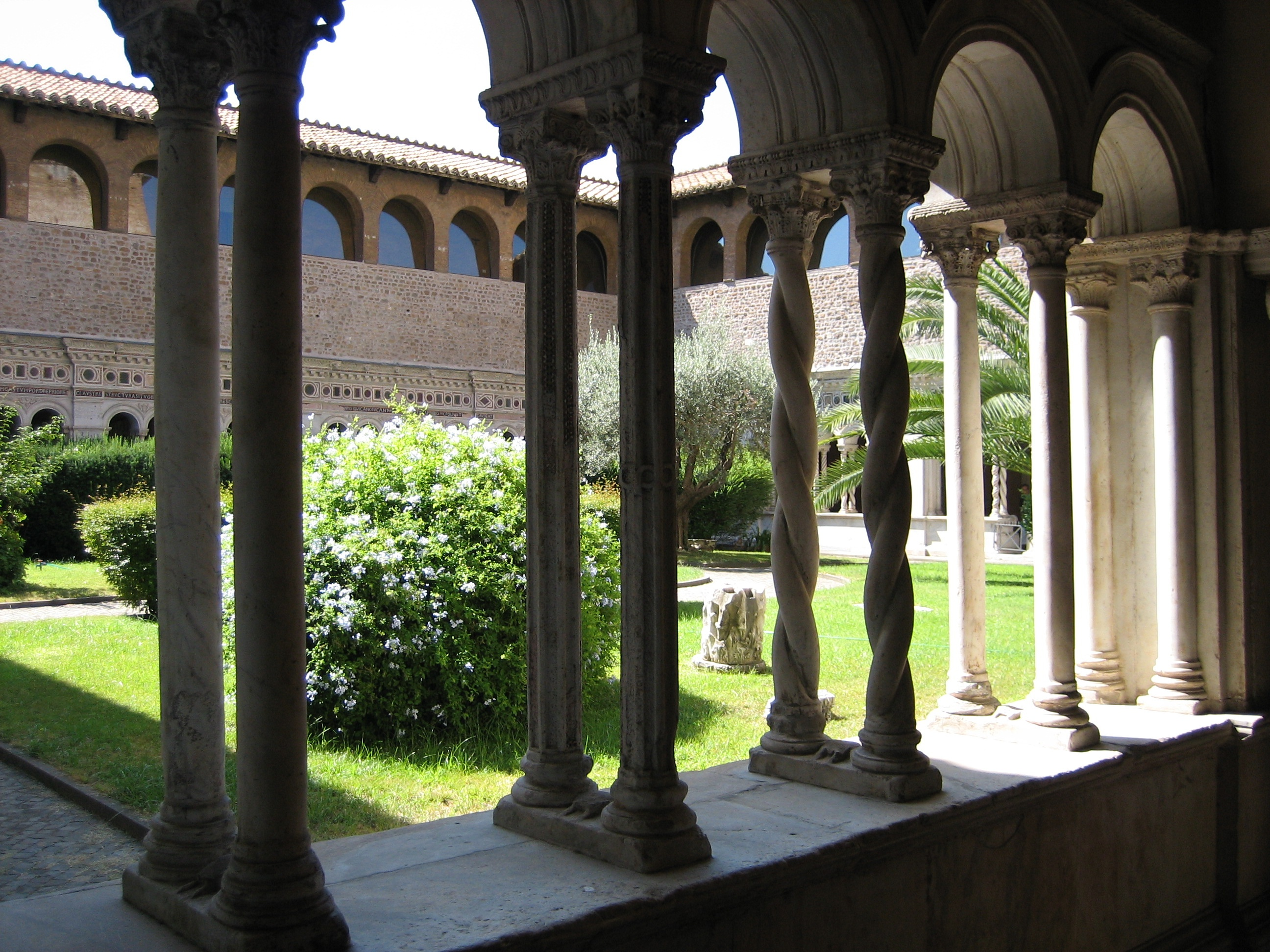
The cloister of the Lateran Palace.

That Bulgarian mission was mentioned thirteen years later (June 879) in a letter to Boris I, with which Pope John VIII tried to prevent Bulgaria from returning to the Patriarchate of Constantinople. That letter proves Peter's participation in the mission of 866:

To our favourite and spiritual son Michael, the glorious Prince of the Bulgarians. ...you sent during the time of our predecessor, the venerable Pope Nicolas, your envoys, namely Peter, your relative, John and Martin, to the Cathedral of the venerable apostle Peter, which is a head and a teacher of all Churches of God... we advise your highness to humbly and voluntarily return to the holy Roman Church, your mother, so that, helped by the prayers of the holy apostles, you can easily conquer both your visible and invisible enemies.

The Bulgarian envoys received the answers of Pope Nicolas I at a ceremony in the Lateran Palace on 13 November 866. Soon after that Peter and the other envoys returned to their country along with the papal emissaries Formosus of Portus and Paul of Populona. Both bishops exercised educative activities in Bulgaria. Along with Peter departed other Papal envoys, the bishop of Ostia Donatus, the presbyter Leo and the deacon of the apostolic episcopacy Marinus, who had to continue to Constantinople and there clarify the policy of Rome to the Bulgarians.

=== Second mission ===
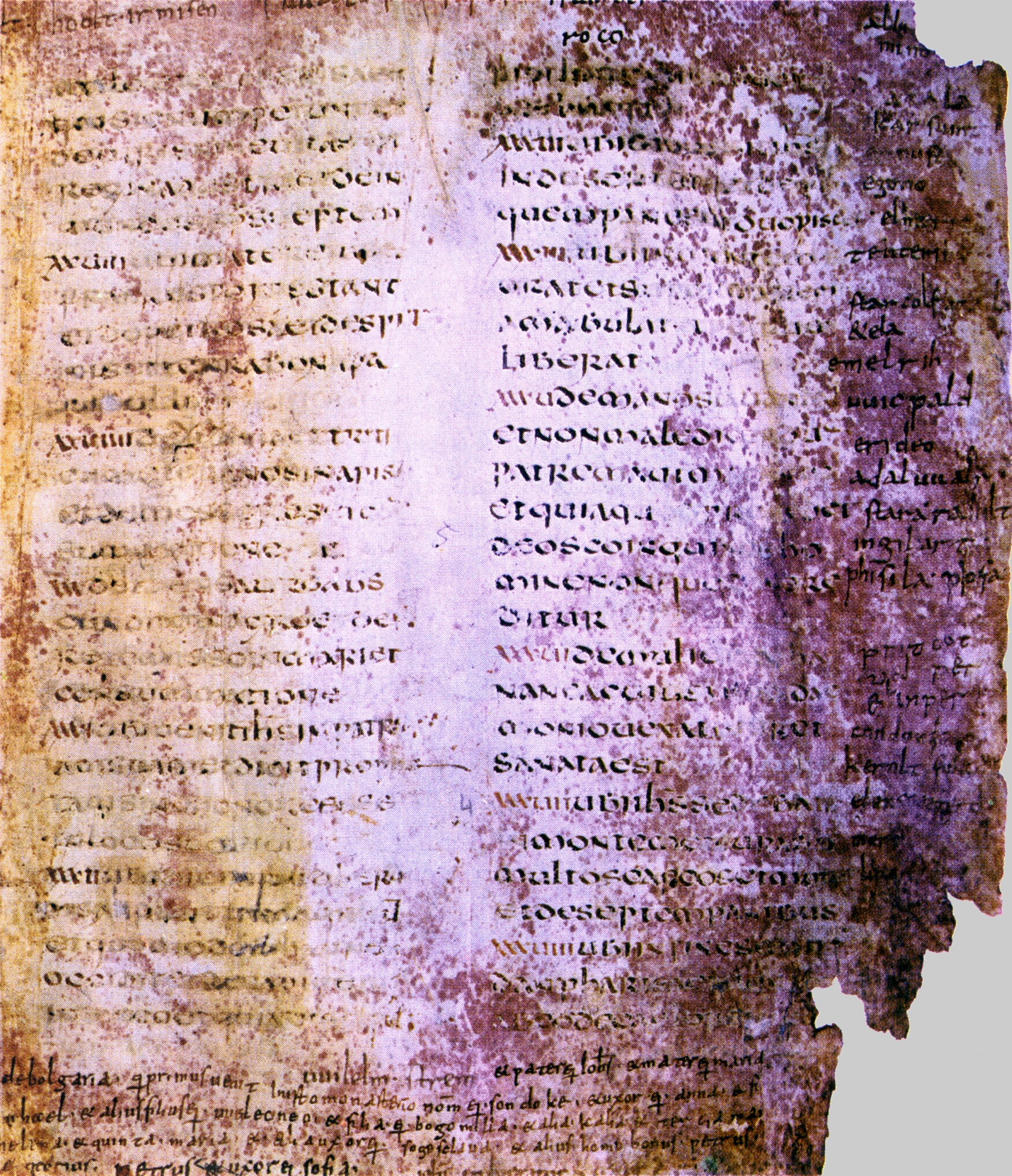
A page of the Cividale gospel.

The abilities and the efforts of Formosus of Portus impressed Boris I. No later than a year after his first mission in Rome, Peter was put in charge of a second one in order to arrange the ordination of Formosus as Bulgarian archbishop. The Bulgarian delegation arrived in Rome in the second half of 867. Nicolas I declined the proposal concerning Formosus and accepted only the other request of Boris I — to send more presbyters to Bulgaria. The curia prepared a group of clerics led by Dominic of Trivena and Gromuald of Polymartis. The unexpected death of Nicolas I on 13 November 867 postponed the papal response and the departure of the group. Peter and the other Bulgarian diplomats participated in the burial of the deceased Pope and waited in Rome until the election of a new pontiff. The new Pope Hadrian II confirmed the decisions of his predecessor. In the middle of December the delegation headed back for the Bulgarian capital Pliska by land, with letters to the Bulgarian prince written by Nicolas I. En route to Bulgaria the delegation stayed in the monastery of the town Aquileia, an event noted in the Cividale gospel in which an unknown monk wrote down the names of the Bulgarian envoys and the members of their families:

...From Bulgaria, who came first in that monastery, his name is Sondoka and his wife Anna, and his father John, and his mother Maria, and his son Michael, and his other son Velegnev, and his daughter Bogomila, and the other one Kalya, and the third Marta, and the fourth Elena, and the fifth Maria, and his other wife Sobeslava. And the other noble man Peter... and George. Peter and his wife Sofia.

The delegation arrived in Pliska in the beginning of 868. Boris I learned that the Pope had offered him to choose the archbishop of the Bulgarian Church from among the presbyters he had sent. By order Hadrian II, Formosus of Portus and Paul of Populona returned to Rome as early as February in the same year, accompanied by Peter. Boris I was disappointed with the Pope's answers and decided to end the negotiations with Rome.

=== Third mission ===
The historical source for the positions of the Bulgarian ruler is the biography of Pope Hadrian II, written by the Vatican librarian Anastasius:

...That envoy [Peter] brought along with the kingly gifts a letter from the Prince [Boris I], who asked the high primate to send him either the well known Marinus, after ordaining him as an archbishop, or send one of the cardinals of his Church — the most worthy man to be chosen by the Bulgarians for an archbishop because of his wisdom, character and life, and after being approved by them and returns to the Pope, to be awarded the title of archbishop.

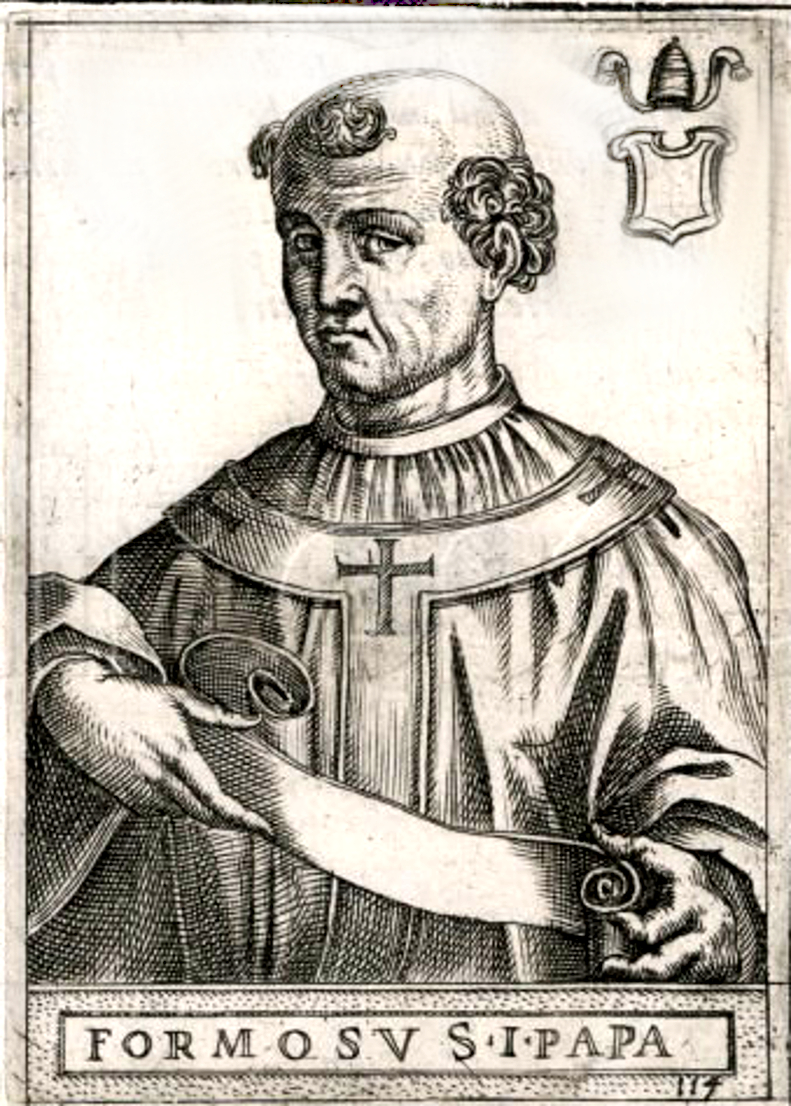
Formosus of Portus.

It is certain that the idea for the application of Marinus was suggested to Boris I by Formosus of Portus. Formosus and Marinus were friends and close associates. Marinus was an influential diplomat who participated in many missions between Rome and Constantinople. However, Hadrian II did not approve of him and suggested for the office one of his trusted men — the subdeacon Silvester. With his decision the Pope underestimated the ambitions of Boris I for independent church policy, which led to the alienation of the Bulgarian ruler from Rome and indirectly helped the Patriarchate of Constantinople in its efforts to influence the events in Bulgaria.

When in the beginning of 868 Peter and Formosus arrived in Rome, the brothers Cyril and Methodius and their disciples were there on invitation by the Pope. Formosus and bishop Gauderig of Veletria ordained many of the brothers' disciples for priests, deacons and subdeacons. It has been suggested that Peter was among the first high-ranking Bulgarians who were acquainted with the ideas of Cyril and Methodius and brought the news to Bulgaria.

The refusal of Hadrian II to ordain a candidate approved by Boris exhausted the patience of the Bulgarian prince. After a three-month stay in Bulgaria Silvester returned to Rome with a letter to the Pope in which for the last time Boris I insisted that either Formosus or Marinus be ordained, but the Pope declined the proposal once again. During that time the Bulgarian ruler had already started negotiations with the Patriarch of Constantinople Ignatius, who was trying to improve the relations with Rome, which had been strained after the mutual anathemas made in 863 by his predecessor Photios I and Pope Nicolas I. Just like Photios, however, Ignatius did not want to allow a permanent establishment of the Roman Church in Bulgaria. In order to settle the differences between the two Churches, the Eighth Ecumenical Council was planned to be held in Constantinople in 869. After a long stay in Rome (868–869), Peter returned to Bulgaria and was immediately sent to participate in the council.

== Mission to Constantinople ==
The Eighth Ecumenical Council was inaugurated on 5 October 869. Besides the representatives of Rome and Constantinople, the event was attended by envoys of the Eastern Patriarchs of Jerusalem, Alexandria and Antioch. The Papal legates were unaware of the secret negotiations between Bulgaria and Byzantium and did not expect to discuss the status of the Bulgarian Church on the council. As a result, they were very surprised to see high-ranking Bulgarian envoys attending the official closure of the council on 28 February 870: the ichirgu-boil Stazis, khan-bagatur Sondoke, khan-tarkan Iliya, sampsis Persiyan and sampsis Alexius Hunol.

On 4 March 870, three days after the council's final session, Emperor Basil I invited the participants to the Imperial Palace: Patriarch Ignatius, the Papal legates Donatus of Ostia, Stephen of Nep and deacon Marinus, as well as the representatives of the Eastern Patriarchs archdeacon Joseph (from Alexandria), bishop Thomas of Tyre (from Antioch) and presbyter Elijah (from Jerusalem), telling them that Peter was bringing gifts from the Bulgarian Prince. After the exchange of greetings Peter, who had been instructed in advance, raised the issue of the jurisdiction over the Bulgarian Church and turned to the assembled men:

Up to now we were pagans and not long ago we entered the blessing of Christianity; that is why, in order not to make mistakes, we want to known from you, who represent the supreme Patriarchs, to which Church are we to obey...

The Roman legates answered:

To the holy Roman Church, to which through you, Peter, your lord came to the venerable Prince of the apostle Peter along with the whole realm of his people...

In order to take decision the envoys of the Eastern Patriarchs asked the Bulgarian delegated the following question: "When you took [your] Motherland, tell us under which authority it used to be and were there Latin or Greek priests?". They gave the prepared answer: "We took [our] Motherland with arms from the rule of the Greeks and there we found not Latin but Greek priests." In compliance with the response of the Bulgarian envoys, the Eastern Patriarchates pronounced their decision: "If you have found Greek priests, it is clear that this land was under the rule of Constantinople... Therefore we adjudge, because the Bulgarian motherland, as we got to know, was previously under Greek ruler and had Greek priests, to be now returned again through Christianity to the holy Church of Constantinople, from which it was separated through paganism." The protests of the Roman legates were futile. They forged a letter in which the Pope allegedly warned the Patriarch of Constantinople not to interfere with the Bulgarian matters, but Ignatius ignored it. After the council (in the very same year) the Latin priests had to leave Bulgaria and were substituted by Byzantine missionaries.

== Title ==
In the historical literature Peter is thought to have been: boyar, great boil, comita, ichirgu-boil and kavhan (conditional or unconditional). The discussion on the title (or office) of Peter is part of the scientific discussion on the place of the ichirgu-boil and the kavhan in the administration of the First Bulgarian Empire. The starting point of those discussions is that there were one kavhan and one ichirgu-boil at the same time and that the kavhan is the higher office. The different views on the functions of Peter comes from the different interpretation of the historical sources (the letters of Pope John VIII, the notes of the Cividale gospel and the story of Anastasius Bibliothecarius about the Council of Constantinople).

In 879 Pope John VIII appealed not only to Boris I but also to his close associates, including Peter. The letter was addressed to "Petro Cerbule et Sundice ceterisque optimatibus et consiliariis dilecti filii nostri Michaelis regis Vulgarorum" ("To Peter, Tserbula and Sundika, and the other boyars and advisers of our favourite son, the Bulgarian prince Michael"). The idea that Cerbule is the personal name Tserbula (Zergobula) is supported by Zlatarski. Veselin Beshevliev interprets that as a title to the personal name of Peter Petro cerbulae (Peter ichirgu-boil). According to Ivan Venedikov in 879 Peter was ichirgu-boil, having replaced Stazis. The connection of Cerbule to Petro has been rejected by Vasil Gyuzelev. He suggests that Cerbule is related to Stazis. The omission of his personal name is explained with the fact that the Roman administration could not always cope with the Bulgarian anthroponymy and used titles instead of personal names.

The historians are also not unanimous about who led the missions to Rome and Constantinople. According to Yordan Ivanov the second mission was led by Sondoke, while Venedikov suggests it was Stazis. According to Gyuzelev the leading person in the Bulgarian delegation was Peter which was made clear during the Council of Constantinople. He emphasizes that according to the story of Anastasius Bibliothecarius the gifts to the Roman legates were sent through Peter. Peter is the person of the Bulgarian delegation in Constantinople who spoke at the council. Gyuzelev also pays attention to the letters of Pope John VIII. Letters were sent to Boris I (16 April 878 and May 879), to Doks — brother of Boris I (April 878), to Peter (16 April 878) and to high ranking boils including Peter (in the letter of May 879). In the letter of April 878 addressed personally to Peter the Pope called him comita (Petrum comitem). It has been suggested that under comita the Pope did not mean a regional governor but comes palatii, i. e. the first person in the court of the ruler. Gyuzelev concludes that Peter's role in the events between 866 and 879 is more important than that of the ichirgu-boil Stazis and therefore Peter must have been kavhan at least during that period.

== Sources ==
- Andreev, Jordan; Milcho Lalkov (1996). The Bulgarian Khans and Tsars (in Bulgarian). Veliko Tarnovo: Abagar. ISBN 954-427-216-X.
- Beck, H.-G. (1980). Geschichte der orthodoxen Kirche im byzantinischen Reich (in German). Göttingen: Vandenhoeck & Ruprecht. ISBN 3-525-52312-2.
- Beshevliev, V. (1981). Bulgar Epigraphical Monuments (in Bulgarian). Sofia: Izdatelstvo na Otechestveniya front.
- Bozhilov, I.; V. Gyuzelev (1999). History of Medieval Bulgaria 7th-14th Centuries (in Bulgarian). Sofia: Anubis. ISBN 954-426-204-0.
- Duychev, I. (1954–1965). "Volume II". Latin Sources on Bulgarian History - LIBI (in Bulgarian). Sofia: BAN.
- Fine, J. (1983). The Early Medieval Balkans. A Critical Survey from the Sixth to the Late Twelfth Century. The University of Michigan Press. ISBN 0-472-10025-4.
- Grotz, H. (1970). Erbe wider Willen - Hadrian II. (867 872) und seine Zeit (in German). Graz: Hermann Böhlaus Nachf. Gesellschaft. ISBN 3-205-08065-3. Archived from the original on 2015-11-18.
- Gyuzelev, V. (1969). Knyaz Boris the First (in Bulgarian). Sofia: Nauka i izkustvo.
- Gyuzelev, V. (2007). The Kavhans and Ichirgu-boils of the Bulgarian Khanate-Empire (VII-XI cent.) (in Bulgarian). Plovdiv: Fondation "Bulgarian Historical Heritage". ISBN 978-954-91983-1-7.
- Hergenröther, I. (1867). Photius, Patriarch von Constantinopel (in German). Regensburg: Verlag Georg Joseph Manz. ISBN 9780790580104.
- Hilferding, A. (1856). Geschichte der Serben und Bulgaren (in German). Bautzen: J. E. Schmaler.
- Litavrin, G. (1988). Conversion to Christianity of the Peoples of Central and South-Eastern Europe and Baptism of the Rus' (in Russian). Moscow: Nauka. ISBN 5-02-009896-5.
- Runciman, Steven (1930). "The Auction of Souls". A History of the First Bulgarian Empire. London: George Bell & Sons. OCLC 832687.
- Sabev, T. (1987). Independent National Church in Medieval Bulgaria (in Bulgarian). Sinodalno izdatelstvo.
- Zlatarski, Vasil (1971) [1927]. "Part I. From the Slavianization to the Fall of the First Empire (852-1018); III. Nationalization of the Bulgarian State". History of the Bulgarian state in the Middle Ages. Volume I. History of the First Bulgarian Empire (in Bulgarian) (2 ed.). Sofia: Nauka i izkustvo. OCLC 67080314.
