= Ballshi inscription =

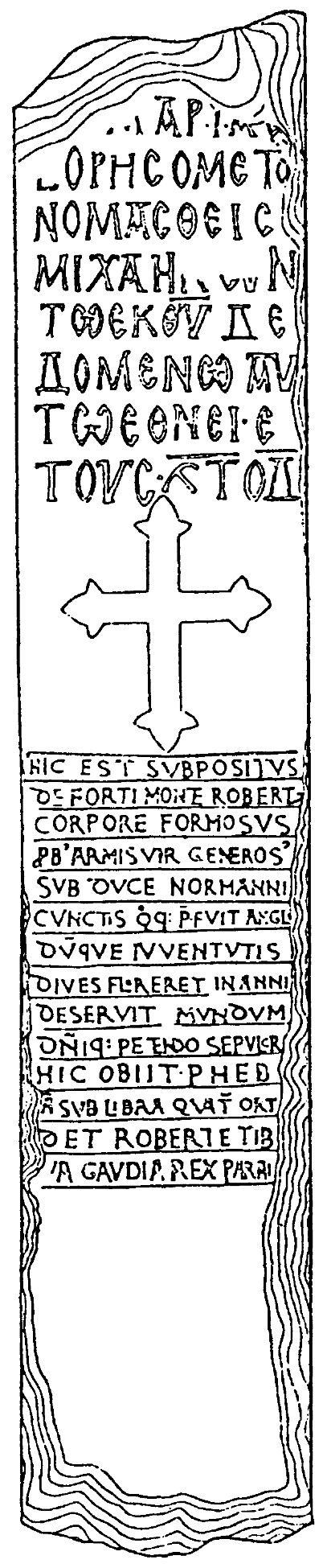
Drawing of the entire column per Praschniker

The Ballshi inscription is an epigraph from the time of the Bulgarian Prince (Knyaz) Boris I (852–889) testifying to the Christianization of Bulgaria. The inscription was unearthed near Ballshi, Albania, in 1918.

The medieval Greek–language Bulgarian inscription covers the upper part of a marble column which also features, in its bottom part, the later Latin epitaph of Norman commander Robert de Montfort who died in 1108, with a cross in the middle of the column. The column was discovered by Austro-Hungarian soldiers during World War I 25 kilometres southwest of the Albanian town of Berat, near Ballshi, among the ruins of a monastery.

The Ballshi inscription is a key domestic source giving important information about the Christianization of the Bulgarians and the location of the southwestern border of the First Bulgarian Empire and the region of Kutmichevitsa during the rule of Boris. Saint Clement of Ohrid's concise biography by Demetrios Chomatenos, early 13th-century Archbishop of Ohrid, hints at the existence of other similar stone columns in the region of Gllavenica, notifying of the baptism of the Bulgarians. Chomatenos even attributes their construction to Clement:

He [Clement] left us in Ohrid such mementos and holy books, as well as the personal works of his eminent thought and hand, that are honoured and esteemed by the entire people no less than the God-written Tablets of Moses. And in Kefallonia one can still see stone columns preserved until today, on which letters have been inscribed, marking the incorporation and integration of the people to Christ.

The current location of the inscription is not known. In the first half of the 20th century, it was exhibited in a museum in Durrës. The National Archaeological Museum in Sofia preserves a plaster print of the epigraph.

== Text ==
[Εβαπτισθη ο εκ θ(εo)υ αρχων Βουλγ]αρια[ς]

Βορης ο μετο-
νομασθεις
Μιχαηλ συν
τω εκ θ(εο)υ δε-
δομενω αυ-
τω εθνει ε-

τους ςτοδ.

[The by God archon of Bulg]aria Boris, renamed Michael, [was baptized] together with his God-handed people in the year 6374 [1 September 865 – 31 August 866]

== See also ==
- Christianization of Bulgaria
- Bulgarians in Albania

== Bibliography ==
- Praschniker, Camillo (1920). Zwei mittelalterliche Inschriften aus Albanien, Anzeiger der phil-hist. Klasse dar Akademie der Wissenschaften in Wien, 56 Jahrg, 1919, № XIII (in German). Wien. pp. 73–76.
- Бешевлиев, Веселин (1979). Първобългарски надписи (in Bulgarian). София. p. 139.
- Бешевлиев, Веселин (1981). Прабългарски епиграфски паметници (in Bulgarian). София. pp. 87–88.
- Златарски, Васил Н (1923–1924). "Намереният в Албания надпис с името на княз Борис-Михаила". Slavia (in Bulgarian) (II): 61–91.
- Иванов, Йордан (1931). Български старини из Македония (in Bulgarian). София. pp. 12–16.
