= Anna (daughter of Presian) =

Anna Анна
- Parent: Khan Presian of Bulgaria
- Relatives: Boris I of Bulgaria (brother)

See also "Anna (daughter of Boris I)".

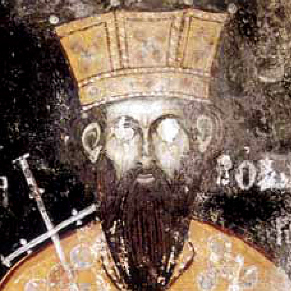
The depiction of Anna's brother Boris. Monastery of Saint Naum.

Anna (in Bulgarian: Анна) was a Bulgarian noble lady and the daughter of the Khan of Bulgaria. She lived in the 9th century.

== Life ==
Anna was a daughter of the Khan Presian of Bulgaria (Персиян), who was a pagan. Her mother’s name is unknown, whilst her grandfather was called Zvinitsa. The original name of Anna is also unknown – she was a pagan, but she later converted to Christianity. According to the chronicle, she was captured by the Byzantines, and whilst she was living at the court of the Emperor, she was converted to Christianity, but was exchanged for the monk Theodoros Koupharas.

The (half-)brother of Anna was Boris I of Bulgaria, who became a Christian – like Anna – and is celebrated as a saint in Bulgaria. He named his daughter after Anna.

It is unknown when Anna died. She was buried in Bulgaria.
