= Maria (wife of Boris I of Bulgaria) =

- Tsarina Consort of Bulgaria
- Spouse: Boris I of Bulgaria
- Issue: Vladimir of Bulgaria; Gavriil; Simeon I of Bulgaria; Jacob; Anna

Maria (Bulgarian: Мария) was a Bulgarian royal consort as the wife of the Knyaz Boris I of Bulgaria. Her parents are unknown. She is mentioned in one charter from 850/96, together with her family members.

These are the children of Boris and Maria:

- Vladimir of Bulgaria
- Gavriil (Gabriel)
- Simeon I of Bulgaria
- Jacob
- Anna
