= Christianization of Bulgaria =

Baptism of Bulgaria
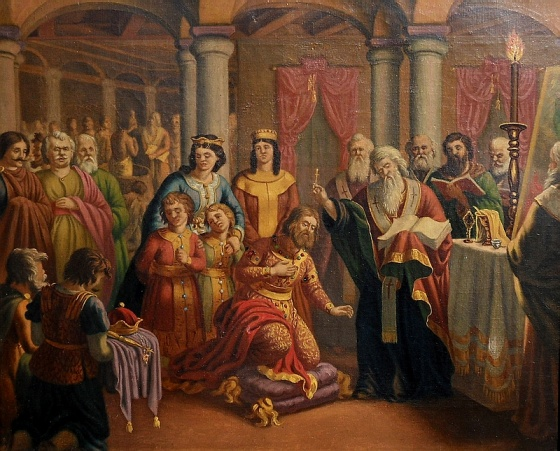
- Baptism of the Pliska court by Nikolai Pavlovich (1835–1894) – date of completion unknown
- Date: 864 AD
- Location: First Bulgarian Empire
- Outcome: Bulgaria converts to Christianity

The Christianization of Bulgaria was the process by which 9th-century medieval Bulgaria converted to Christianity after the baptism of its leader Boris I.

It reflected the need of unity within the religiously divided Bulgarian state as well as the need for equal acceptance on the international stage in Christian Europe. This process was characterized by the shifting political alliances of Boris I (ruled 852–889) with the kingdom of the East Franks and with the Byzantine Empire, as well as his diplomatic correspondence with the Pope.

Because of Bulgaria's strategic position, the churches of both Rome and Constantinople each wanted Bulgaria in their sphere of influence. They regarded Christianization as a means of integrating Slavs into their region. After some overtures to each side, the Khan adopted Christianity from Constantinople in 870. As a result, he achieved his goal of gaining an independent Bulgarian national church and having an archbishop appointed to head it.

== Background ==
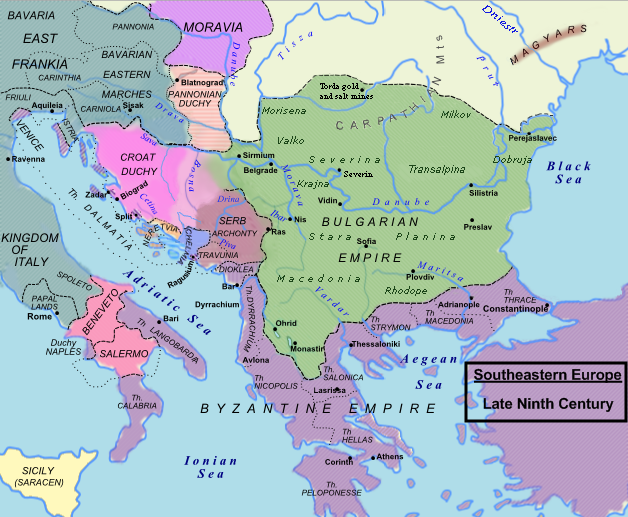
Bulgaria under rule of Boris I

When Khan Boris began his reign in 852, the international situation in Southeast Europe was characterized by a race for influence in the region, both cultural and political. The conflict with the Byzantine Empire for domination over the Slavic tribes in modern-day Macedonia and Thrace was still far from being resolved. In the middle Danube region, Bulgaria's interests crossed with those of the emerging kingdom of the East Franks and the principality of Great Moravia. It was about that period when Croatia emerged on the international scene, carrying its own ambitions and demands for territories in the region.

On a larger scale, the tensions between Constantinople and Rome were tightening. Both centres were competing to lead the Christianization that would integrate the Slavs in South and Central Europe. The Bulgarian Khanate and the Kingdom of the East Franks had established diplomatic relations as soon as the 20s and 30s of the 9th century. In 852, at the beginning of the reign of Khan Boris, a Bulgarian embassy was sent to the Council of Mainz to tell Louis II of the change of power in Pliska, the Bulgarian capital. Most probably the embassy also worked to renew the Bulgarian-German alliance.

At this time, there were already many Christians living in the country; missionaries had travelled to Bulgaria in the first century and episcopates had been set up there.

=== Initial setbacks ===
Some time later, Khan Boris concluded an alliance with Rastislav of Moravia (846–870) instigated by the King of the West Franks, Charles the Bald (840–877). The German Kingdom responded by attacking and defeating Bulgaria, forcing Khan Boris to later re-establish an alliance with the German king directed against Great Moravia, a Byzantine ally. The situation held great risk for the weakened Bulgarian state. War broke out with the Byzantine Empire between 855 and 856. The Byzantines wanted to regain control over some fortresses on the Diagonal Road (Via Diagonalis or Via Militaris) that went from Constantinople, through Philippopolis (Plovdiv), to Naissus (Niš) and Singidunum (Belgrade). The Byzantine Empire was victorious and reconquered a number of cities, with Philippopolis being among them.

In 861 Khan Boris concluded an alliance with East Frankish King Louis the German, all while informing him that he would like to accept Christianity according to western rite. This renewed alliance threatened Great Moravia, which sought help from Byzantium (862–863). This was at the same time when a Byzantine mission to Great Moravia was taking place. Cyril and his brother Methodius intended to draw Great Moravia closer to Constantinople and strengthen the Byzantine influence there.

Khan Boris was more interested in the first Slavonic alphabet Cyril and Methodius had created. Bulgaria wanted to implement the Slavonic alphabet as well as a means to stop the cultural influence of the Byzantine Empire.

In the last months of 863 the Byzantines attacked Bulgaria again, probably after having been informed by their Moravian allies that Boris told the German king he was willing to accept Christianity and Byzantium had to forestall him from taking up Christianity from Rome. A Rome-dependent Bulgaria in the hinterland of Constantinople was a threat to the Byzantine Empire's immediate interests.

== Aligning with the East ==
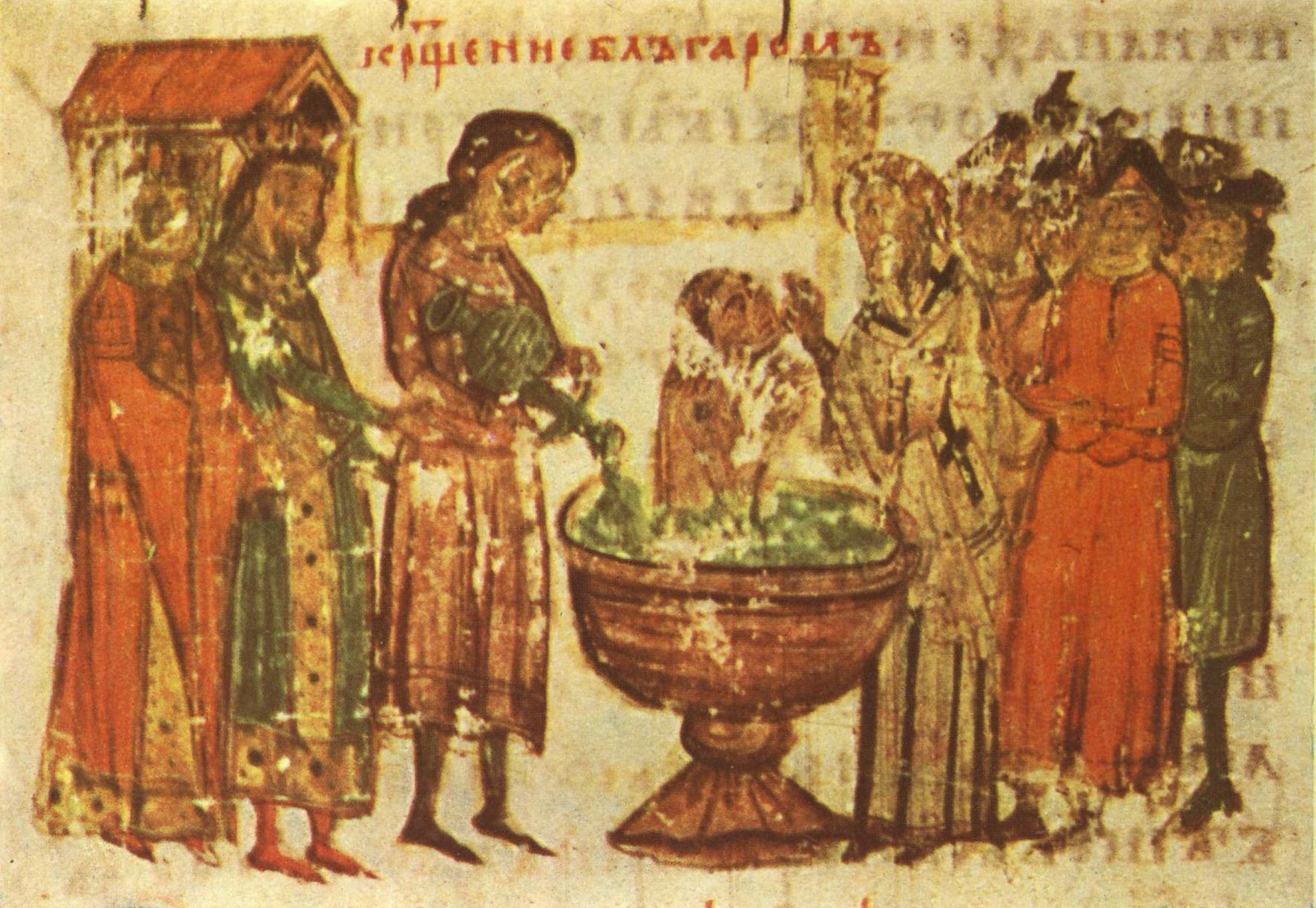
The baptism of St. Boris I.

Before any actual military engagements took place, Khan Boris was forced to sue for peace due to being unprepared for war because of Bulgaria being badly affected by crop failure and earthquakes that year, which Boris may have taken for a sign to convert according to the eastern rite. Negotiations were set up and Boris promised to convert to Eastern Orthodox Christianity along with his people, requesting missionaries to come to Bulgaria and begin the process.

The two sides concluded a "deep peace" for a 30-year period. In exchange for Bulgaria's conversion, the Byzantines returned previously conquered lands. In the late autumn of 864, a mission from the Patriarch of Constantinople Photios arrived at the Bulgarian capital Pliska and converted the Khan, his family and high-ranking dignitaries. Boris was given the Christian name Michael (after then Byzantine Emperor Michael III). According to most scholars, he changed his title to the Slavic equivalent of King (Knyaz). After that the Bulgarian population began converting to Christianity.

== Reasons for Christianization ==
Following the conquests of Khan Krum of Bulgaria at the beginning of the 9th century, Bulgaria became an important regional power in Southeastern Europe. Its future development was connected with the Byzantine and East Frankish empires. Since both of these states were Christian, Pagan Bulgaria remained more or less in isolation, unable to interact on even grounds, either culturally or religiously.

After the conversion of the Saxons, most of Europe became Christian. The preservation of paganism among the Bulgars and the Slavs, the ethnic groups that formed, along with the local, Romanized (later called Vlachs) or Hellenized Christian Thracian population, the Bulgarian people and nation brought another disadvantage — the pagan and Christian ethnic groups' unification was hampered by their different religious beliefs. Christianity had its roots in the Bulgarian lands prior to the formation of the Bulgarian state through the native populations mentioned above.

== Reaction ==
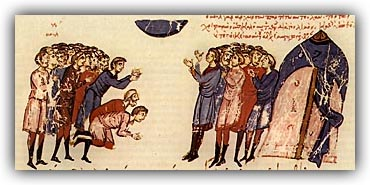
The Bulgarians pray to God for a famine to go away

Louis the German was not satisfied with Boris' plan, but he did not carry his fears on to open conflict.

As Byzantine missions converted the Bulgarians, their forces encouraged the people to destroy the Pagan holy places. Conservative Bulgarian aristocratic circles opposed such destruction, as they had led the spiritual rituals. In 865, malcontents from all ten administrative regions (komitats) revolted against Knyaz Boris, accusing him of giving them "a bad law". The rebels moved toward the capital, intending to capture and kill the Knyaz and to restore the old religion.

All that is known is that Knyaz Boris gathered people loyal to him and suppressed the revolt. It's noted that God's miracle helped Boris to win the battle, and the armor that he was wearing during battle was asked from the Pope as a gift. He ordered the execution of the leaders of the revolt - boyars and all of their sons - 52 rebels. The common folk who "wished to do penance" were allowed to go without harm.

Until the end of his life, Knyaz Boris was haunted by guilt about the harshness of killing the sons of the revolt's leaders and the moral price of his decision in 865. In his later correspondence with Pope Nicholas I, the Knyaz asked whether his actions had crossed the borders of Christian humility. The Pope answered:

... You have sinned rather because of zeal and lack of knowledge, than because of other vice. You receive forgiveness and grace and the benevolence of Christ, since penance has followed on your behalf.

Different interpretations of the historical records have led some historians to believe the Knyaz executed almost half the Bulgarian aristocracy to end the religious and political conflict. His aristocratic opponents had feared that the Byzantine Empire would spread its influence through Christianity and destroy Bulgaria. At this time during the Middle Ages, Bulgarians considered "Christians" as equivalent to their traditional competitors the "Byzantines", or "Greeks", as they were most often called. Many Bulgarians thought that along with Christianity, they would be forced to accept the Byzantine way of life and morals.

== Choice between Rome and Constantinople ==
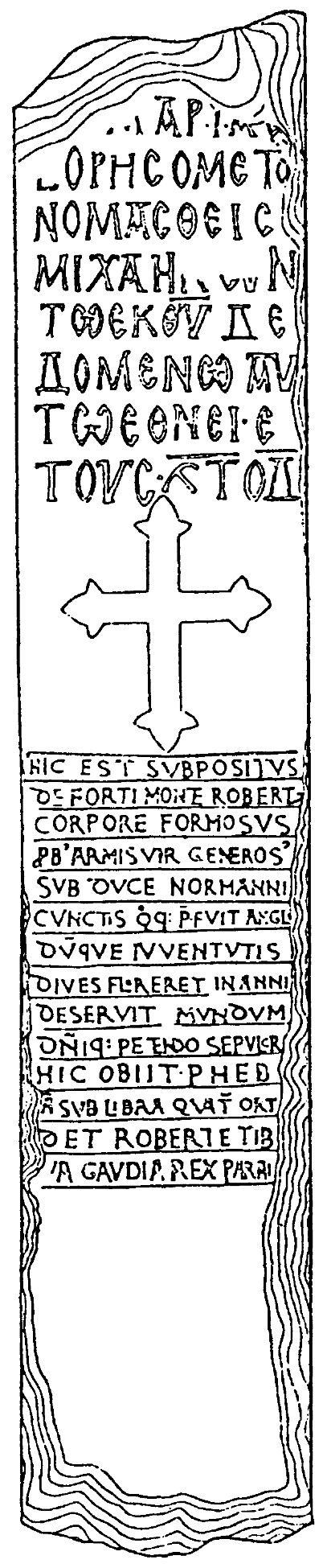
Ballshi Inscription

Knyaz Boris realized that the Christianization of his subjects would result in greater Byzantine influence. The liturgy was performed in the Greek language, and the newly established Bulgarian Church was subordinate to the Church of Constantinople. The revolt against the new religion prompted the Knyaz to ask Constantinople to allow the Bulgarian Church independent status.

When Constantinople refused to grant the Bulgarian Church independence, Knyaz Boris turned to the Pope. At the end of August 866, a Bulgarian mission led by the kavhan Peter arrived in Rome, carrying a list of 115 questions from Knyaz Boris. These had to do with the Christian way of life of the newly converted Bulgarians and the potential organization of a future Bulgarian Church under Rome's jurisdiction. On 13 November 866, the Bulgarian Knyaz received the Pope's 106 answers. Formosus from Portus and Paul of Populon led the Pope's mission. At the same time, the Pope sent other emissaries to Constantinople.

When the Roman clerical mission arrived, Boris was sufficiently satisfied with Rome's response that he ordered the Byzantine mission to leave Bulgaria. This was viewed as an official change of Bulgarian orientation from Constantinople to Rome. Seeing Rome's emissaries there, the German mission also left Bulgaria, satisfied that Bulgaria will be in the Roman diocese.

Emperor Michael III was displeased by Bulgaria's banishment of Byzantium's clergy. In a letter to Knyaz Boris, the Byzantine emperor expressed his disapproval of Bulgaria's religious reorientation by using offensive language against the Roman Church. This sparked the old rivalry between the two branches of Christianity. In less than two years, Bulgaria's name became widely known in Western Europe.

In Constantinople, people nervously watched the events taking place in Bulgaria. They believed a pro-Roman Bulgaria threatened Constantinople's immediate interests. A religious council was held in the summer of 867 in the Byzantine capital, during which clerics criticized the Roman Church's actions of recruiting Bulgaria. Pope Nicholas I was anathematized.

Without losing time, Knyaz Boris asked the Pope to appoint Formosus of Portus, who years later became Pope Formosus, as Bulgarian archbishop. The Pope refused, with the official response being that Formosa already had an eparchy.

The Pope ordered new leaders, Dominic of Trivena and Grimwald of Polimarthia, of a mission to be sent to Bulgaria. Soon after, Nicolas died. His successor, Pope Adrian II (867-872), also failed to respond to Knyaz Boris' request for appointment of a Bulgarian archbishop.

Knyaz Boris proposed another candidate for Bulgarian archbishop, Marinus. Deacon Marinus at this time was a papal legate in Constantinople and did not have an eparchy, but the Pope refused. Instead, he received a cleric named Silvester, a man so low in the hierarchy that was not authorized to carry out liturgy by himself. After he had a three-day stay in Pliska, the Bulgarians sent him back to Rome accompanied by emissaries carrying a letter of complaint by Knyaz Boris. Boris perceived Rome's refusals of his request and delays as an insult and a sign of the Pope's unwillingness to coordinate selection with him of a Bulgarian archbishop. Marinus became Pope just a few years later with the name Pope Marinus I.

As a result, Boris began negotiations again with Constantinople, with whom he expected more cooperation than shown in the past. But, on 23 September 867, Emperor Michael III was killed by his close acquaintance Basil, who established the Macedonian dynasty that ruled the Empire until 1057. Patriarch Photius was replaced by his ideological rival Ignatius (847-858; 867–877). The new rulers of the Byzantine Empire quickly lessened tensions between Constantinople and Rome. Pope Adrian II needed the help of Basil I against the Arabs' attacks in Southern Italy. On the other hand, Byzantium anticipated the Pope's support for Patriarch Ignatius.

== Result ==
As a result of the leaders' agreements, a Church Council was held in Constantinople. After the end of the official conferences, on 28 February 870 Bulgarian emissaries arrived in Constantinople, sent by the Knyaz and led by the Ichirguboil (the first councilor of the Knyaz) Stasis, the Kan-Bogatur (high-ranking aristocrat) Sondoke, the Kan-Tarkan (high-ranking military commander) among others.

Few people suspected the real purpose of these emissaries. On 4 March Emperor Basil I closed the council with a celebration at the Emperor's palace. In attendance was the Bulgarian Kavkan (roughly a vicekhan or viceknyaz) Peter. After he greeted the representatives of the Roman and Byzantine Churches (the Roman being first), Kavkan Peter asked under whose jurisdiction the Bulgarian Church should fall. The Roman representatives were not prepared to discuss this matter.

There appeared to have been a secret agreement between the Byzantine Patriarch, the Emperor and the Bulgarian emissaries. The Orthodox fathers immediately asked the Bulgarians whose clergy they had found when they came to the lands which they now ruled. They answered "Greek". The Orthodox fathers declared that the right to oversee the Bulgarian Church belonged only to the Constantinople Mother Church, which had held jurisdiction on these lands in the past.

The protests of the Pope's emissaries were not taken into account. With the approval of the Knyaz and the Fathers of the council, the Bulgarian Church was declared an archbishopric. The archbishop was to be elected among the bishops with the approval of the Knyaz. The creation of an independent Bulgarian archbishopric was unprecedented. Usually, independent churches were those founded by apostles or apostles' students. For a long period, Rome had been challenging Constantinople's claim of equality to Rome on the grounds that the Church of Constantinople had not been founded by an apostle of Christ. Prior to the middle of the 9th century, in the practice of the formally united Church, there were no precedents for creating national churches among newly converted peoples. Such nationalization of the church and liturgy was exceptional and not at all part of the practice of other European Christians. Bulgaria created this precedent and set the example for others to follow.

Just six years after his conversion, the Orthodox Church granted Knyaz Boris a national independent church and a high-ranking supreme representative (the archbishop). Over the next 10 years, Pope Adrian II and his successors made desperate attempts to regain their influence in Bulgaria and to persuade Knyaz Boris to leave Constantinople's sphere.

Boris I became more spiritual as he grew older, and he spent the last few years of his life as a monk. His son attempted to depose Christianity and bring back the pagan ways, but Boris I defeated him and placed his younger son on the throne instead.

== Legacy ==
The conversion of the Bulgarians to Christianity and the establishment of the Bulgarian national Church coincided with the unprecedented cultural prosperity in Bulgaria which had begun in 855 AD with the adopting of the disciples of Saints Cyril and Methodius' alphabet, who under the patronage of Knyaz Boris implemented for the first time, the Cyrillic alphabet and established literary schools in Pliska and Ohrid. This led to the Slavic Old Church Slavonic becoming the official language of the Bulgarian Church as well as initiating the beginning of the Golden Age of medieval Bulgarian culture during which the Cyrillic alphabet was spread by Bulgarian scholars to other Slavic states such as Russia and Serbia.

== See also ==
- Timeline of Christian missions
- List of oldest church buildings
- Christianization of the Slavs
- Saints Cyril and Methodius
- Old Bulgarian (also called Old Church Slavonic)
- Early Cyrillic alphabet
- Cyrillic script
- Boris I of Bulgaria
- Glagolitic alphabet
- Ballshi inscription

== Bibliography ==
- Sullivan, R.E., (1994) Christian Missionary Activity in the Early Middle Ages (Variorum Collected Studies Series). Ashgate Publishing Limited, ISBN 0-86078-402-9.
- Vlasto, A.P., (1970) The Entry of the Slavs into Christendom: an Introduction to the Medieval History of the Slavs. Cambridge University Press.
