= Ivandjiiski =

Ivandjiiski may refer to:

- Daniel Ivandjiiski (born 1978), Bulgarian-American founder of Zero Hedge
- Krassimir Ivandjiiski (born 1947), former Bulgarian Ministry of Foreign Trade official, publisher and editor-in-chief of the Bulgarian political news website Strogo Sekretno, father of Daniel Ivandjiiski
