= GFC =

GFC may refer to:

== Economics and finance ==
- GEROVA Financial Group
- Global Financial Crisis, 2008
- Green Fiscal Commission, United Kingdom, 2007–2008
- Guilt-free consumption, the spread of ethical consumerism

== Non-profit organisations ==
- Girls For A Change
- Global Forest Coalition
- The Global Fund for Children

== Sport ==
=== Football ===
- Garhwal F.C., New Delhi, India
- Geelong Football Club, Australia
- Gillingham FC, Kent, England
- Glenavon F.C., County Armagh, Northern Ireland
- Glenavy F.C., County Antrim, Northern Ireland
- Glentoran F.C., Belfast, Northern Ireland
- Global F.C., Philippines
- Goodyear F.C., Northern Ireland
- Gorilla FC, a fan club of Seattle Sounders FC, US
- Greenlandic Football Championship
- Groomsport F.C., County Down, Northern Ireland
- Guangzhou F.C., south China
- Guarani FC, Campinas, Brazil
- Guernsey F.C., Channel Islands
- Gyeongnam FC, South Korea

=== Other sports ===
- Global Fighting Championship, an Emirati kickboxing and MMA event
- Golden Fighter Championship, a Romanian kickboxing promotion
- Groupama–FDJ, a French cycling team (UCI code:GFC)

== Other uses ==
- Generic flow control, part of an Asynchronous Transfer Mode cell
- "GfC", a 2008 single from Albert Hammond Jr.'s album ¿Cómo Te Llama?
- Girard form class, in forestry
- Global Forest Change dataset
- Grand Forks Central High School, North Dakota, United States
- Groupes Franc Motorisé de Cavalerie, a WWII French Army unit type
- Guangzhou–Foshan circular intercity railway, a railway line of the PRDIR.
