= Gumoshtnik =

Gumoshtnik Гумощник
- Village
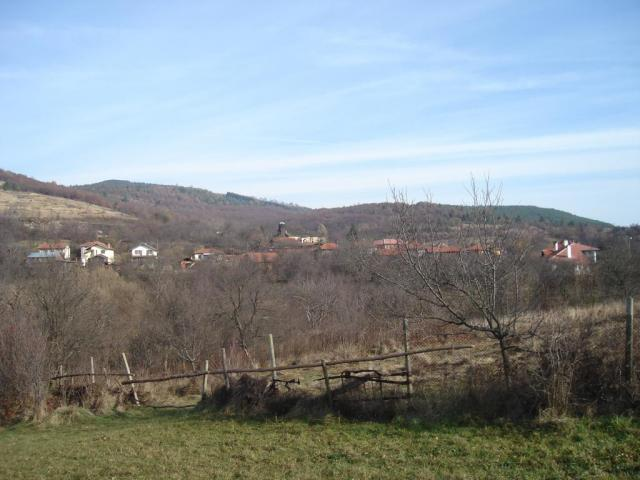
- View from the village of Gumoshtnik, Bulgaria

- Location within Bulgaria
- Coordinates: 42.9333°N 24.8333°E
- Country: Bulgaria
- Province: Lovech Province
- Municipality: Troyan
- Time zone: UTC+2 (EET)
  - Summer (DST): UTC+3 (EEST)

Gumoshtnik is a village in Troyan Municipality, Lovech Province, northern Bulgaria.

== Geography ==
Gumoshtnik is situated 499 metres above sea level in the Beklemeto Pass of the Balkan Mountains. It lies 20 kilometres outside the town of Troyan and 15 kilometres from Apriltsi.

== Population ==
Gumoshtnik was at its largest in the 15th century, containing over 4,000 people at its height. As of the 2021 census, the village has around 240 residents.

== History ==
The earliest evidence of settlement in Gumoshtnik dates from the 1st millennium BC, as bronze belts and armlets from the period were found in the village.

Gumoshtnik was an administrative centre in the 15th century, containing seven public houses and eight manufacturing businesses. Monastic education was introduced into the village in 1829, when a monastery school was founded.

In 1926, residents built the St. Nicholas Letni Church, which has been declared a site of national significance for Bulgaria. A year later, the village established a community center, named after Paisius of Hilendar. The centre contains a library with over 9,000 books, and a gallery dedicated to artwork by a local artist, Tsanko Marinov. Both have received local recognition as places of historical interest.

=== Titanic ===
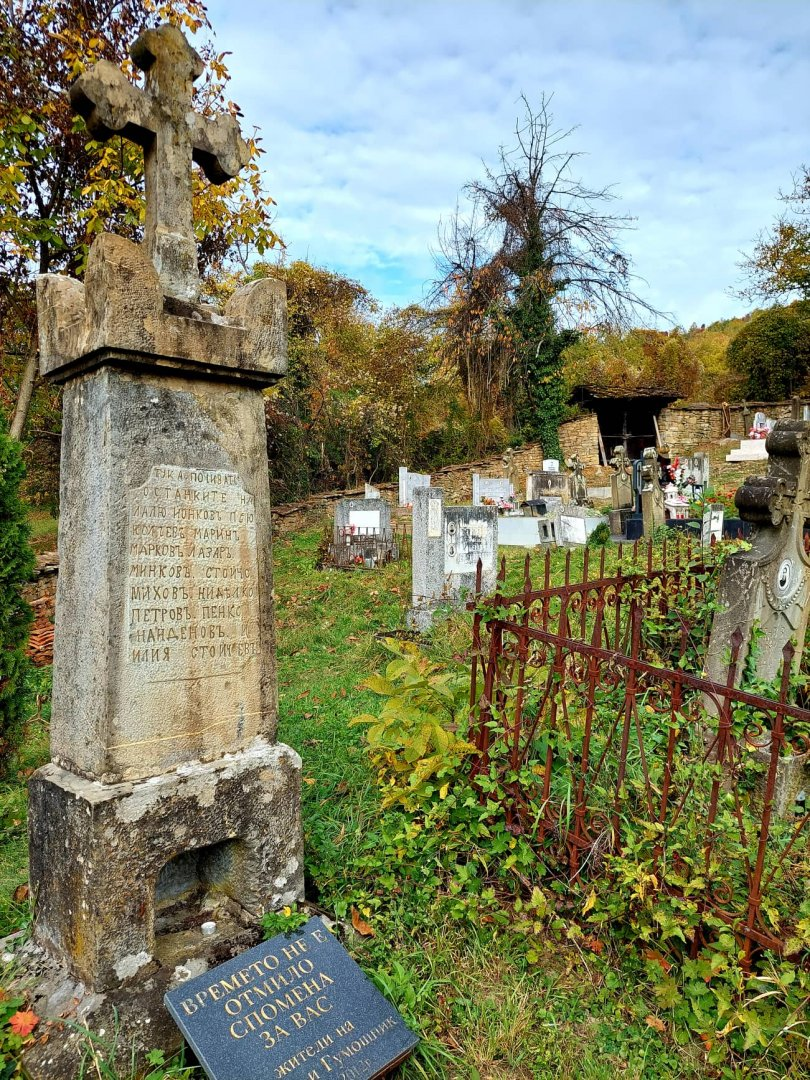
Titanic memorial at Gumoshtnik as of 2025.

Of the 38 to 50 Bulgarian nationals who boarded the ill-fated Titanic in 1912, most of them were from Gumoshtnik. A total of eight men from Gumoshtnik were on board, who died when the boat sank.

A memorial stands on the grounds of the St. Nicholas Letni Church, and Gumoshtnik residents hold an annual remembrance of the disaster. The Gumoshtnik memorial is the only memorial dedicated to the disaster in Bulgaria.

The Gumoshtnik residents who are presumed to have died on the Titanic are as follows:

- Peyo Kolchev: Also listed as Petr Kolev and Peju Coltcheff; a general labourer who boarded the Titanic aged 36.
- Lazar Minkov: First cousin of Peyo, he was 23 years of age.
- Penko Naidenov: Aged 22 at the time of the disaster.
- Iliya Stoychev: Aged 19 at the time of the disaster.
- Lazar Yonkov: Went by the nickname of “Lalyo,” and was 23 years old at the time of his presumed death.
- Marin Markov: 35 years old at the time of his presumed death.
- Stoycho Mihov: 28 years old at the time of the disaster.
- Nedyalko Petrov: Also known as Nedialco Petroff. Though he is recorded in the British National Archives as having been 19 years old at the time of his presumed death, he is remembered locally as having been newly 18 years old at the time of the disaster.

Although some sources erroneously record that one of the eight men from the village survived, this appears to be based on a local legend, as the memorial contains eight names that can be located on the Titanic's passenger list.
