= Chiflik, Lovech Province =

Chiflik Чифлик
- Village
- Location within Bulgaria
- Coordinates: 42.9167°N 24.6667°E
- Country: Bulgaria
- Province: Lovech Province
- Municipality: Troyan
- Time zone: UTC+2 (EET)
  - Summer (DST): UTC+3 (EEST)

Chiflik (Bulgarian: Чифлик) is a village in Troyan Municipality, Lovech Province, northern Bulgaria.

== Geography ==
Chiflik is situated 15 kilometres southwest of Troyan, near the source of Osam river, and 160 kilometres northeast of Sofia. Several mineral hot springs, with an average depth of 1,000 metres, fall within its boundaries. The village, which lies within the Balkan Mountain Range, is also within a one-hour walking distance of the Kozya Stena Natural Reserve, one portion of the Central Balkan National Park.

=== Ecology ===
Chiflik is one of the last places in Europe where wild edelweiss, a national symbol of Bulgaria, continues to grow. Deer and wild boars populate the forests around Chiflik.

== Governance ==
The village elects a mayor who represents Chiflik within the government of the Troyan Municipality.

== Economy ==
Chiflik contains active farms, particularly pastoral farms. Chiflik is also a tourist destination due to its hot springs, and the village contains businesses, pools, and hotels centered on spa activity.

== Population ==
As of 2024, Chiflik has a population of 321 people. This represented a change of 9 registered residents from the time of the 2011 census, when 330 residents were recorded.

== Traditions ==
Since 1995, the village has hosted an annual event called the "Empty Wedding," on the Bulgarian feast day of Saint Theodore. The event involves two men performing a pantomime wedding, with one playing a female bride. The event is a humorous response to the Orthodox custom that no legal weddings should take place on this day.

Chiflik also hosts an annual Potato Festival on the second Saturday of every October. The event showcases various potato-based foods. The village also hosts games and live music during the festivities.
