= Terziysko =

Terziysko refers to the following places:

- Terziysko, Burgas Province, Bulgaria
- Terziysko, Lovech Province, Bulgaria
