= Golyama Zhelyazna =

Golyama Zhelyazna Голяма Желязна
- Village
- Location within Bulgaria
- Coordinates: 42.9667°N 24.4667°E
- Country: Bulgaria
- Province: Lovech Province
- Municipality: Troyan
- Time zone: UTC+2 (EET)
  - Summer (DST): UTC+3 (EEST)

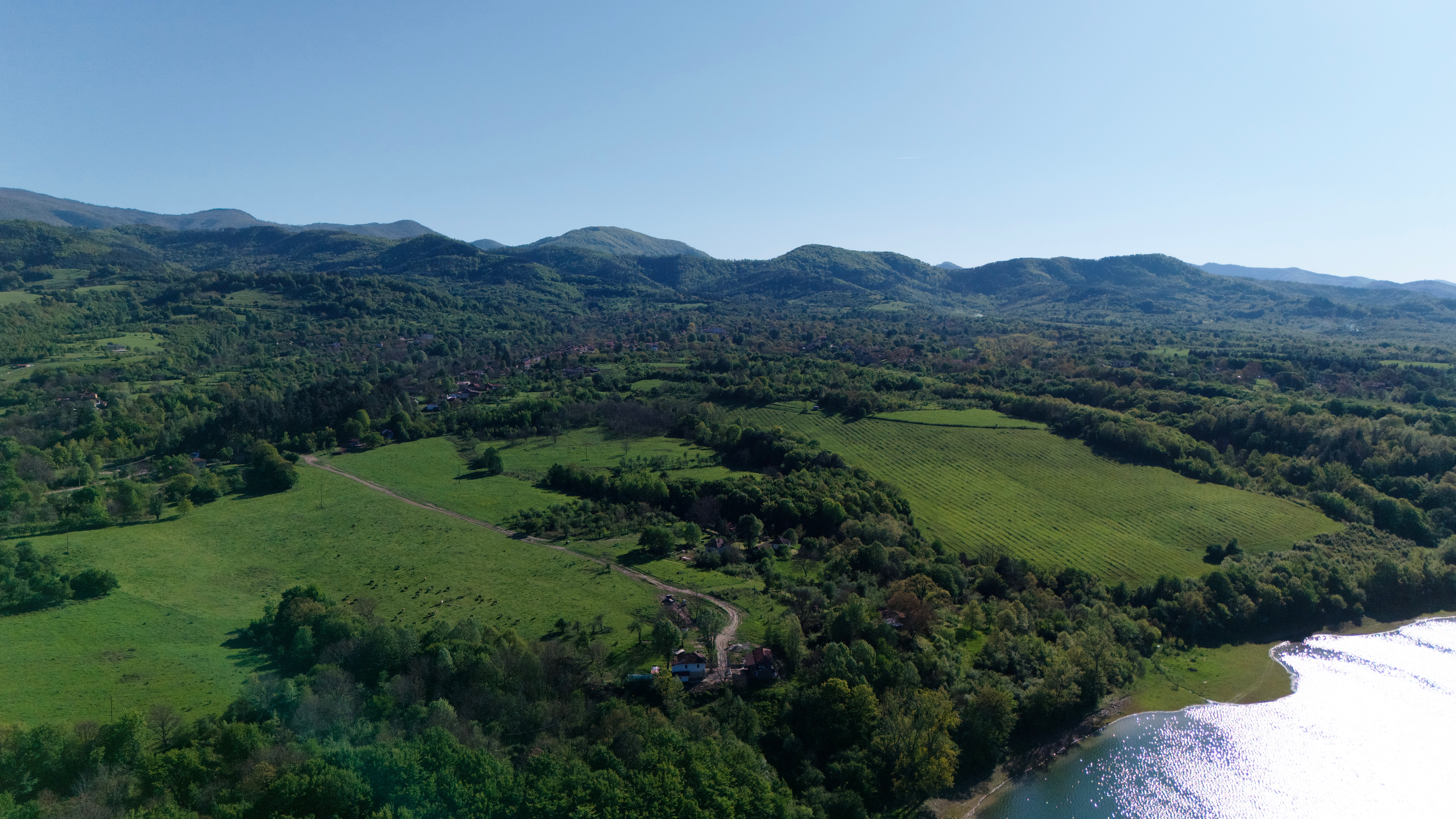
Golyama Zhelyazna, 2025

Golyama Zhelyazna is a village in Northern Bulgaria, part of the Troyan Municipality in the Lovech Province. Its population is 508 people (as of March 15, 2024).

== Geography ==
Golyama Zhelyazna is located in the Vasilovska foothills of the Stara Planina mountain range, on the border of the municipalities of Ugarchin and Troyan. The distance to the municipal center of Troyan is 32 km.

The Toplya River flows through the village, originating from the cave of the same name.

The dam was completed in 1961.

Part of the land of Golyama Zhelyazna is occupied by the "Sopot" dam (in fact, the larger part of the dam lies in the territory of Golyama Zhelyazna).

The most famous natural landmarks include the Toplya and Yalovitsa caves, the Kupena rock (near the Topla cave), Momski kamak, and others. Currently, the "Sopot" dam also attracts significant interest, offering good conditions for fishing and water sports.

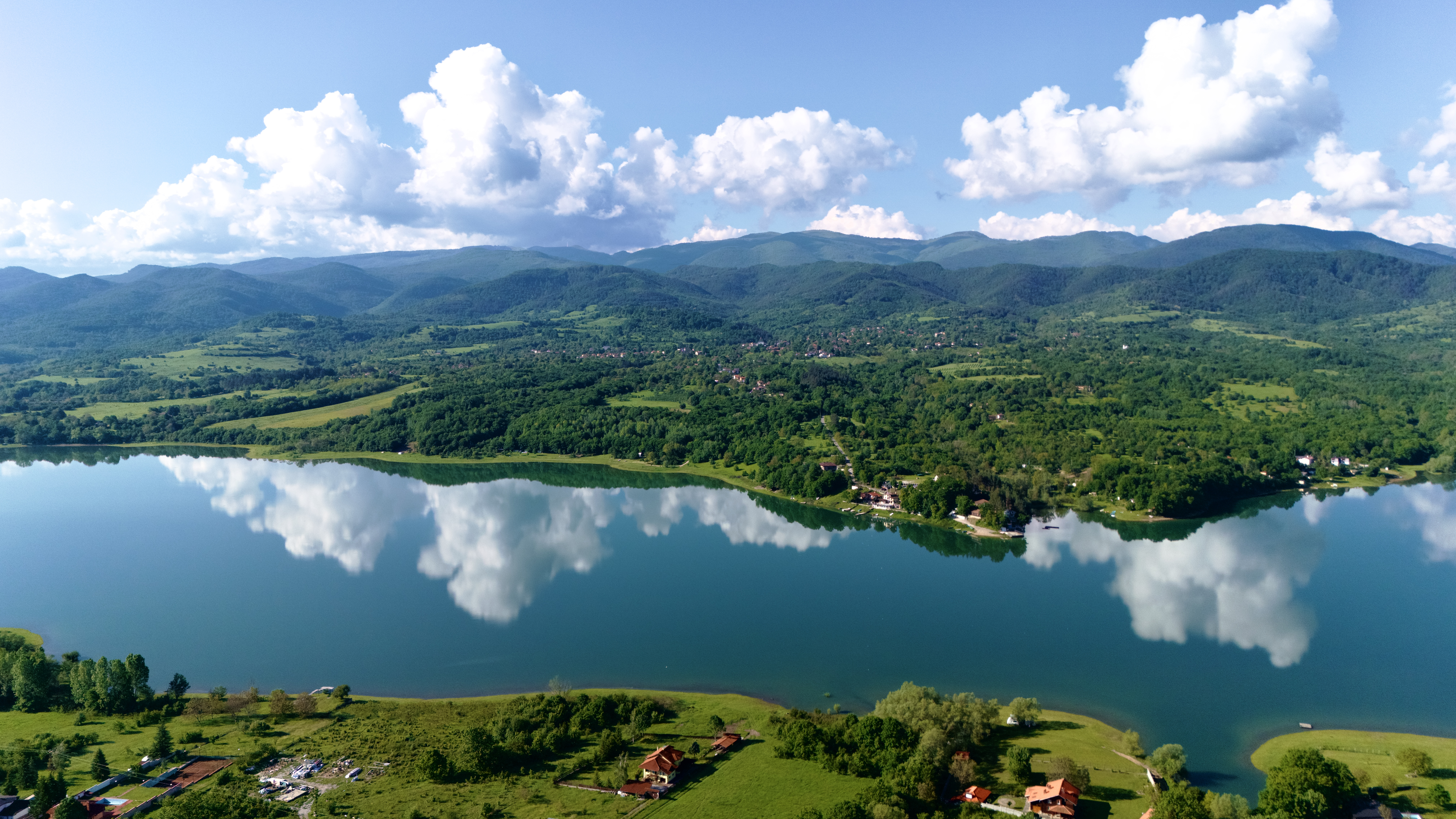
Golyama Zhelyzna, 2025

== History ==
The first traces of human presence in the area of the village are Neolithic finds in the Toplya cave. Other evidence of early settlement includes numerous artificial mounds in the village's land.

The village is first mentioned in Ottoman documents from the 15th century under the name Zelezna. There are two theories regarding the origin of the name. The first is that during the late Middle Ages, Saxon miners arrived here and mixed with the local population. The second theory is that after the suppression of the Chiprovtsi Uprising in the 17th century, some refugees settled here and began extracting iron ore. In both theories, the name is undeniably related to the iron ore deposit in the Encha area, in the village’s land. Today, the deposit is no longer exploited due to insufficient ore reserves.

According to a legend about the founding of the village, it was initially called Brailitsa and was located in the Nyagalovoto area. About 300 years ago, it was moved due to soil depletion. Its new location was in the area of today’s Burdene neighborhood, which became the name of the new settlement. According to the legend, the village was struck by a plague epidemic, and in order to survive, the population was forced to hide. The plague was supposedly plowed out by two twin brothers with two twin oxen in the Chumin Krust area. Afterward, the village continued to exist peacefully and even prospered due to its location on the Varna-Dubrovnik road. The development of trade began to bring significant income to the population.

The village’s prosperity, however, attracted the attention of the inhabitants of neighboring settlements. The people of Burdene were accused of murdering a Turkish woman from Borima, a crime committed by the Turks themselves, who secretly threw her body into the Burdene stables. Fear of revenge for the alleged crime forced the Burdene people to scatter. They split into three groups. According to another version, the revenge involved the killing of some of the Bulgarians, and their houses were burned down. Part of the Burdene people migrated to the Plovdiv region, while others settled in the nearby area of Zhelyazna. This marked the foundation of the modern village of Golyama Zhelyazna. The third group fled to Romania.

Men from Golyama Zhelyazna participated in both the struggles for liberation from the Ottoman Empire and in the wars for the national unification of Bulgaria. When the Balkan War broke out in 1912, one resident of Golyama Zhelyazna volunteered for the Macedono-Odrin militia.

== Аdministration ==
The mayor of the village of Golyama Zhelyazna is Violeta Stoyanova.

The town hall's working hours are from 8:00 AM to 5:00 PM, with a lunch break from 12:00 PM to 1:00 PM. In the center of the village, there is its town hall.

== Culture ==
A notable landmark of the village is the church building, constructed in 1857. Other sites of cultural and archaeological significance include the old and new buildings of the community center, the settlement mound in the Petar area, the prehistoric foundry, numerous old houses, the Govedarska house (where the first school was located), the soldier's memorial fountain (in memory of those who died in the two Balkan Wars and World War I), the sacred sites (in the Soychinsko area, in the Torishteto area, in the Cherkovishte area, etc.), the Monastery area, where there are remains of an old monastery, and more.

In 1899, the "Razvitie" community center was founded, and since 1976, it has been housed in a new building. A school was opened as early as 1862, marking the beginning of a long educational tradition in the village, which, however, was discontinued with the closure of the "Tsano Stanchev" primary school. The stone church "St. All Saints" was consecrated in 1857, and it was restored in 2007.

In 2020, an initiative was launched by the "Sharena Zadruga" association for the establishment of an International School For Gastronomy & Heritage Crafts "Sharena Fabrika". In 2024, construction and renovation work began in the old primary school in the village, which is set to be transformed into a culinary school. A main partner for this project is one of the oldest French schools for gastronomy & hospitality - FERRANDI Paris.

A craft school will be established on the site of the old bakery and bathhouse.

The school is expected to open its doors in 2026 and welcome students from around the world.
