= Zero Hedge =

Far-right libertarian financial blog

- Website type: Capital markets finance blog; News and political opinion
- Available in: English
- Owner: ABC Media Limited (Bulgaria)
- Creator: Daniel Ivandjiiski
- Editors: Daniel Ivandjiiski; Tim Backshall
- Website: zerohedge.com
- Commercial: Yes (free content, paid advertising)
- Registration: Optional. Registration is required to post comments.
- Launched: 9 January 2009; 17 years ago
- Current status: Online

Zero Hedge (or ZeroHedge) (Note: A search of the website shows that the website uses Zero Hedge, and ZeroHedge, and even zerohedge, and ZH, when referring to itself in articles.) is a far-right libertarian financial blog and news aggregator. Zero Hedge has a bearish market sentiment in its investment outlook and analysis, often deriving from a strict adherence to the Austrian School of economics and credit cycles. It has been described as a financial "permabear".

Over time, Zero Hedge expanded into non-financial political content, (Note: Former Zero Hedge staff writer, Colin Lokey, on departing acrimoniously in April 2016, alleged to Bloomberg that Zero Hedge had become increasingly focused on non-financial material as a way to increase traffic on the site.) including conspiracy theories and fringe rhetoric, and has advanced radical right, alt-right, and pro-Russia positions. Zero Hedge's non-financial commentary has led to multiple site bans by global social media platforms, although a 2019 Facebook ban and a 2020 Twitter ban were later reversed.

Zero Hedge's in-house content is authored by its owner Daniel Ivandjiiski under the pen name "Tyler Durden". The motto of the site is posted in the masthead of every page: "On a long enough timeline the survival rate for everyone drops to zero". The quote is from the book and film Fight Club, which is in turn a paraphrase the quote "In the long run we are all dead" by John Maynard Keynes.

== History and authorship ==
Zero Hedge's first post appeared on 9 January 2009 at 4pm, and the domain was registered on 11 January 2009 under the name Krassimir Ivandjiiski of ABC Media Ltd, the father of Daniel Ivandjiiski, who founded Zero Hedge. According to American City Business Journals in 2012, the website "publishes financial news and opinion, aggregated and original" from several writers "who purportedly hail from within the financial industry."

In September 2009, news reports identified Daniel Ivandjiiski, a Bulgarian-born, U.S.-educated, (Note: Graduated from the American College in Sofia, Bulgaria (1997), and then moved to the U.S. and graduated from the University of Pennsylvania with a degree in molecular biology.) former hedge-fund trader, who was barred from the securities industry in September 2008 for earning US$780 from an insider trade by FINRA, as the founder of the site, and reported that "Tyler Durden" was simply a pen name for Ivandjiiski. FINRA rulings show Ivandjiiski worked for 3 years at New York investment bank, Jefferies & Co., as well several hedge funds, the last of which was Wexford Capital LLC, a fund led by former Goldman Sachs traders. One site contributor, who spoke to New York magazine in an interview arranged by Ivandjiiski, said "up to 40" people could post under the "Tyler Durden" pseudonym. The same New York magazine article, published on 27 September 2009, stated that Ivandjiiski's father was Krassimir Ivandjiiski, a Bulgarian publisher and editor of the pro-Russia right-wing conspiracy theory website Strogo Sekretno ("Top Secret"), and monthly publication Bulgarian Confidential, since 1994. (Note: In the translated "About Us" page of Strogo Sekretno, Krassimir describes the publication as: "Above all, Top Secret is a national political newspaper. It is the only independent newspaper in Bulgaria, which is the only real alternative to manipulated mass media." The paper's website is at strogosekretno.com.)

The domain zerohedge.com is registered in Bulgaria to a company called ABC Media Ltd, managed by Krassimir Ivandjiiski. In a 29 April 2016 Bloomberg article "Unmasking Zero Hedge", the authors writing as "Tyler Durden" were revealed as Ivandjiiski, then age 37, Tim Backshall, age 45 (a credit derivatives strategist), and Colin Lokey, age 32 (a Seeking Alpha staff writer). Lokey, the newest member, who joined in 2015, publicly revealed himself and the other two, when he left the site in April 2016. Ivandjiiski confirmed the three men "had been the only Tyler Durdens on the payroll" since Lokey joined in 2015. Lokey said he was paid $6,000 per month, and received a bonus of $50,000, earning over $100,000 in 2015. According to Ivandjiiski, the blog generates revenue from online advertising (as there is no subscription service).

In March 2020, Bulgarian litigation between Krassimir Ivandjiiski and U.S. journalist Seth Hettena revealed further details about the Ivandjiiski family and the site's ownership.

In August 2020, Zero Hedge paid $140,000 to Dow Jones & Company to settle copyright-infringement allegations after Zero Hedge allegedly posted 37 editorials and articles from The Wall Street Journal without permission.

=== Access to White House press corps ===
In April 2025, during the 2025 stock market crash, Zero Hedge was admitted to the White House press corps.

In May 2025, a reporter from Zero hedge was given the opportunity to ask the first question at a press briefing, in which he asked a question regarding the Clinton body count conspiracy theory.

According to an article:

The White House has officially opened its doors to a website accused of spreading Russian propaganda. Press Secretary Karoline Leavitt welcomed Zero Hedge's Liam Cosgrove to the new media seat Monday—who predictably proceeded to relay conspiracy theories when given an opportunity to ask the first question at the morning press briefing... Cosgrove asked two questions... The second was about an old conspiracy theory resurfaced by the president himself. 'So, over the weekend, President Trump posted [on] Truth Social, a video highlighting what most people call the 'Clinton body count,' Cosgrove said. 'Which is the strange number of suicides that seem to happen in Clinton circles—'

=== Site bans ===
On 12 March 2019, Bloomberg reported that Facebook had banned users from sharing Zero Hedge posts three days earlier. MarketWatch, noting that Zero Hedge is a "frequent critic of Facebook", reported that the ban was lifted later that day with Facebook saying that the ban was a "mistake with our automation to detect spam". Business Insider, describing Zero Hedge as "a favorite of City and Wall Street traders, known for its anti-establishment and bearish slant on financial topics", noted that Donald Trump Jr. and Nigel Farage raised objections to Facebook's censure of Zero Hedge.

Australian telecom company Telstra temporarily denied access to Zero Hedge and other websites on 20 March 2019 as a result of the Christchurch mosque shootings.

On 20 January 2020, Zero Hedge's Twitter account, which then had 670,000 followers, was "permanently suspended" from Twitter for violating its platform manipulation policy. Bloomberg News reported that Zero Hedge had been informed by Twitter that the suspension was as a result of an article titled: "Is This The Man Behind The Global Coronavirus Pandemic?", in which they doxed a Chinese virologist at the Wuhan Institute of Virology. On 12 June 2020, Twitter reinstated the account after an appeal from Zero Hedge and stated that the suspension was an error.

On 17 June 2020, Zero Hedge was banned from the Google Ads platform after Google claimed that Zero Hedge violated its content policy that "explicitly prohibit[s] derogatory content that promotes hatred, intolerance, violence or discrimination based on race from monetizing" on stories related to George Floyd protests. Google lifted the ban in July 2020, after the management of Zero Hedge began moderating comments.

Zero Hedge revealed on 17 June 2020 that PayPal had, like Google, deplatformed the site, and they would only be able to accept cryptocurrency payments in the future.

== Manifesto and views ==
At its creation in January 2009, Zero Hedge published a manifesto on the objectives of the site.

=== Financial views ===
Zero Hedge promotes the Austrian School, the belief that economic cycles are really credit cycles, and that the quantitative easing ("QE") by global central banks is a temporary and artificial asset-price support scheme which makes the credit cycle even more extreme. As a result of this view, Zero Hedge supports assets that are outside of the central banking system, including precious metals, and cryptocurrency. The site is strongly against Keynesian economics.

Critics of Zero Hedge label the site a "permabear", whose views missed the global recovery since 2013. Zero Hedge maintains financial views/theories which are considered conspiratorial, and/or hard-to-prove or unprovable. Notable views include: (Note: It is not possible to list all such views expressed on Zero Hedge, nor is it possible to definitively rank the views; however, given that such views are acknowledged as an important part of the site, a considered list of major such views is provided.)

1. Price manipulation by high-frequency trading ("HFT"). The belief that investment banks/funds use HFT/"dark pools" to manipulate prices; (Note: This was the original Zero Hedge theory that brought the site to prominence in 2009; the theory gained some support, and in particular from the Michael Lewis book Flash Boys.)
2. Precious metals manipulation. The belief that investment banks manipulate precious metals prices to suit their derivative books; (Note: As a believer in the Austrian School of economics and thus a strong supporter of precious metals ("PMs"), the site has often interpreted falls in the price of PMs as being market manipulation.)
3. Plunge-protection-team ("PPT"). The belief that central banks intervene in markets on a frequent, almost daily basis, to support prices; (Note: The term "plunge protection team" generates thousands of article links on the Zero Hedge site; disclosures by the Bank of Japan regarding its very frequent ETF trading activities are used as support; also, seemingly irrational recoveries, such as Brexit, where the U.K. market hit a new high in the months post the shock, are seen as evidence of PPT by Zero Hedge.)
4. U.S banks front running the U.S. FED. The belief that U.S. investment banks, most profitable of all global investment banks, have knowledge of PPT trades; (Note: Zero Hedge has an even wider conspiracy theory around the connections between big U.S. investment banks and the FED; however the site's most used evidence is the fact that U.S. investment banks, during QE programs, rarely have days in the year where they lose money trading.)
5. Market illiquidity. The belief that market liquidity, when HFT and PPT flows are taken out, is low, implying prices are artificial; (Note: Zero Hedge showed in 2009 that much of the headline volume in markets was really HFT (e.g. same share being sold back-and-forward many times per second), and thus illusory; the problem with this theory is that ETFs, the main tool asserted for PPT activity, do not have the same reporting requirements as individual securities (e.g. large PPT ETF trades are not itemised and sourced, as with fund manager 13F trades).)
6. Chinese fraud. The belief that Chinese economic data is made-up, and that many Chinese companies are fraudulent (called "fraudcaps" by the site); (Note: Zero Hedge frequently returns to this theme; cites various evidence including from ex. Fitch analyst, Charlene Chu and short-seller, Jim Chanos; also cites regular reports from Muddy Waters Research.)
7. Manipulation of house prices. The belief that central bankers, Mark Carney as most typical, (Note: Zero Hedge articles on Canadian Bank solvency, impaired by an assertion that Mark Carney was using central bank tools to inflate Canadian house prices, were covered in the main financial media; Zero Hedge has made the same assertion on Mark Carney's impact on U.K. house prices) use houses as stimulus, by loosening mortgage terms. (Note: A central theme of Zero Hedge, is that central banks are using techniques that increase the total indebtedness in society to generate growth, which, as an Austrian School follower, Zero Hedge believes will be temporary; and that the growth only exists while the "flow" of new credit is positive, but regardless of how large the "stock" of credit reaches, once the "flow" turns negative, prices will collapse. Zero Hedge points to housing as a key tool (as well as Student Loans and Auto Loans), and how, despite the fall in housing volumes, central banks have kept house prices rising by loosening mortgage terms, and "help-to-buy" schemes.)

Zero Hedge has published detailed research from Wall Street investment banks and institutions, on securities, which has been picked up by the financial media. Sometimes, the research is about other investment banks. It has also been a source of breaking news in the general capital markets industry. In Zero Hedge's early years, it was associated with exposing the unknown world of High-frequency trading ("HFT"), and the HFT techniques that Zero Hedge claimed amounted to market manipulation.

=== Political views ===
The 29 April 2016 "Unmasking Zero Hedge" article by Bloomberg quoted former website staffer Colin Lokey as saying: "I can't be a 24-hour cheerleader for Hezbollah, Moscow, Tehran, Beijing, and Trump anymore. It's wrong. Period. I know it gets you views now, but it will kill your brand over the long run. This isn't a revolution. It's a joke." Lokey told Bloomberg that he was pressured to frame issues in a way he felt was "disingenuous", summarizing its political stances as "Russia=good. Obama=idiot. Bashar al-Assad=benevolent leader. John Kerry=dunce. Vladimir Putin=greatest leader in the history of statecraft." Lokey provided chat transcripts in which Ivandjiiski refers to America's "silent majority" as "beastly", while Backshall acknowledges life in the U.S. is bad "outside of my bubble". Wallace-Wells observed that the site demonstrated a pro-Russia bias, stating the site had a "pointed" Russophilia.

In a series of articles in June–July 2017, the Financial Times, covering an event organized by one of the site's bloggers, (Note: The event was organised by Zero Hedge contributor, hedgeless_horseman, and it was not an official Zero Hedge function) said that, "It probably didn't help that Zero Hedge was also used as a lead-in for a 2016 New Yorker piece about the alt-right, despite its financial focus and a political bent that is more Drudge than Richard Spencer." In January 2020, when the site was removed from Twitter, BuzzFeed News described Zero Hedge as "pro-Trump" and "far-right", while reporting on the removal, The Washington Post said of Zero Hedge: "In recent years, the blog has amplified right-wing conspiracy theories on a range of topics".

==== Alleged Russian influence ====
In March 2020, American journalist Seth Hettena wrote an opinion-piece in The New Republic titled "Is Zero Hedge a Russian Trojan Horse?", and provided details on the links between Krassimir Ivandjiiski (the site publisher's Bulgarian father), and Soviet-era activities in propaganda, revealed during litigation initiated by the father against Hettena in the Bulgarian courts. Hettena commented that Zero Hedge has become "a forum for the hateful, conspiracy-driven voices of the angry white men of the alt-right. Racists, anti-Semites, extreme right-wingers, and conspiracy nuts were an underserved audience, and, as it turns out, a profitable one."

In February 2022, intelligence officials from the United States claimed that Zero Hedge has amplified Russian propaganda by publishing articles written by Russian state-run media.

== Reception ==
=== Launch to 2014 ===
In August 2009, under the pseudonym Tyler Durden, Ivandjiiski was interviewed on Bloomberg Radio on HFT. Following a series of pieces accusing Goldman Sachs of using high-frequency trading to profit via the New York Stock Exchange, Zero Hedge's readership grew rapidly. In September 2009, journalist Joe Hagan wrote that Zero Hedge's founder was "a zealous believer in a sweeping conspiracy that casts the alumni of Goldman Sachs as a powerful cabal at the helm of U.S. policy." In October 2009, the site was characterized as conspiratorial by financial journalists Justin Fox and Felix Salmon. However, Justin Fox, also described Ivandjiiski as "a wonderfully persistent investigative reporter" and credited him for successfully turning high-frequency trading "into a big political issue," but also termed most of the writing on the website as "half-baked hooey," albeit with some "truth to be gleaned from it."

In his book, Griftopia (2010), Matt Taibbi cited Zero Hedge as having accurately assessed the level of corruption in the banking industry. In January 2011, Zero Hedge was quoted in the Columbia Journalism Review regarding a JPMorgan-Ambac lawsuit: "JPM committed fraud through misrepresentation, then wilfully and maliciously traded against the entities it had sold misrepresented securities to."

In March 2011, Time magazine ranked Zero Hedge as 9th, in its 25 Best Financial Blogs, with nominator, Paul Kedrosky of Bloomberg News stating that "So while I don't read Zero Hedge regularly—it's too bearish, too conspiratorial and too much of an intellectual monoculture—I like knowing that it exists. Any time I'm feeling like things might just turn out O.K. on planet Economic Earth, I know where to turn to be disabused of that stupid idea." Susanne Craig of The New York Times described Zero Hedge in October 2011 as "a well-read and controversial financial blog."

In December 2012, Bank of America, which had been criticized by the site in the past, blocked its employees' access to Zero Hedge from BOA servers.

=== 2014 to 2018 ===
In September 2014, the site was described by CNN as offering a "deeply conspiratorial, anti-establishment and pessimistic view of the world". In November 2014, Craig Pirrong, Professor of Finance at the University of Houston, stated: "I have frequently written that Zero Hedge has the MO of a Soviet agitprop operation, that it reliably peddles Russian propaganda: my first post on this, almost exactly three years ago, noted the parallels between Zero Hedge and Russia Today." In September 2015, economist Paul Krugman described Zero Hedge as a scaremongering outlet that promotes fears of hyperinflation and an "obviously ridiculous" form of "monetary permahawkery." In November 2012, Krugman had noted that Bill McBride of Calculated Risk, an economics blog, has treated Zero Hedge with "appropriate contempt". Krugman has been the subject of hundreds of articles on the website (almost all negative).

In April 2016, as part of its expose from the Colin Lokey interview, "Unmasking the Men Behind Zero Hedge, Wall Street's Renegade Blog", Bloomberg Markets stated that since its founding in the middle of the 2008 financial crisis, "Zero Hedge has grown from a blog to an Internet powerhouse. Often distrustful of the 'establishment' and almost always bearish, it's known for a pessimistic worldview. Posts entitled 'Stocks Are in a Far More Precarious State Than Was Ever Truly Believed Possible' and 'America's Entitled (And Doomed) Upper Middle Class' are not uncommon." In a May 2016 follow-up opinion piece, Noah Smith of Bloomberg News wrote: "Zero Hedge has become known as a source of cutting-edge news, rumors and gossip about the financial industry, as well as a haven for gold bugs, foes of the Federal Reserve and critics of high-frequency trading"; and also that: "But I've realized that the website is also something else—a kind of support group for financial industry workers who are worried about their own economic future in the face of sweeping changes in technology, regulation and demand".

=== Post–2018 ===
On 20 November 2019, NBC News reported Zero Hedge as the initial source of a "misleading claim about the head of the Ukrainian energy company at the heart of the House impeachment inquiry", which went viral during the impeachment hearings. NBC said that "ZeroHedge apparently misconstrued the original Russian article from the Interfax-Ukraine News Agency, which did not mention an indictment. The Interfax-Ukraine News Agency operates as part of Interfax, a Russian news outlet".

In January 2020, after Zero Hedge had been removed from Twitter, The Washington Post said that, "Zero Hedge launched in 2009, mostly featuring news and commentary about financial markets from a libertarian perspective. In recent years, the blog has amplified right-wing conspiracy theories on a range of topics."

== Litigation ==
=== GEROVA Financial ===
On 27 March 2012, Daniel Ivandjiiski was named as a co-conspirator in a civil complaint regarding a "complaint for damages and equitable relief". The complainant, Noble Investments, a seed money investor in GEROVA Financial Group, alleged that Dalrymple Finance had, with Zero Hedge and others, (Note: The complaint did not name Forbes as a co-conspirator but alleged that Forbes was the unsuspecting target of their actions) engaged in a short and distort stock manipulation scheme, by publishing negative reports on GEROVA in January 2011. The complaint stated that, amongst other charges, the defendants made damaging accusations that major shareholders, the Galanis family, and GEROVA senior executives, were involved in a "pump and dump" scheme; it also made ad hominem attacks on both Daniel Ivandjiiski, and his then alleged father, Krassimir Ivandjiiski. (Note: These attacks focused on their Bulgarian citizenship, and that Bulgaria was a global center of organized crime, cybercrime, and fraud, and that Krassimir Ivandjiiski has worked for the Bulgarian government during the Soviet-era.)

Dalrymple replied: "Writing research on quoted companies and distributing that research to financial media outlets, is neither illegal and is a daily legitimate activity on Wall Street". The complaint did not progress and there was no SEC investigation. GEROVA Financial's share collapsed in 2011, and never recovered. On 24 September 2015, the SEC charged several senior GEROVA executives and a few major investors in GEROVA with a "stock fraud scheme", for which several, including the former company chairman and president, Gary Hirst, received jail sentences in 2017.

== See also ==
- Krassimir Ivandjiiski
- Daniel Ivandjiiski
- Marc Faber
- John Hussman
