= Shipkovo =

Shipkovo Шипково
- Village
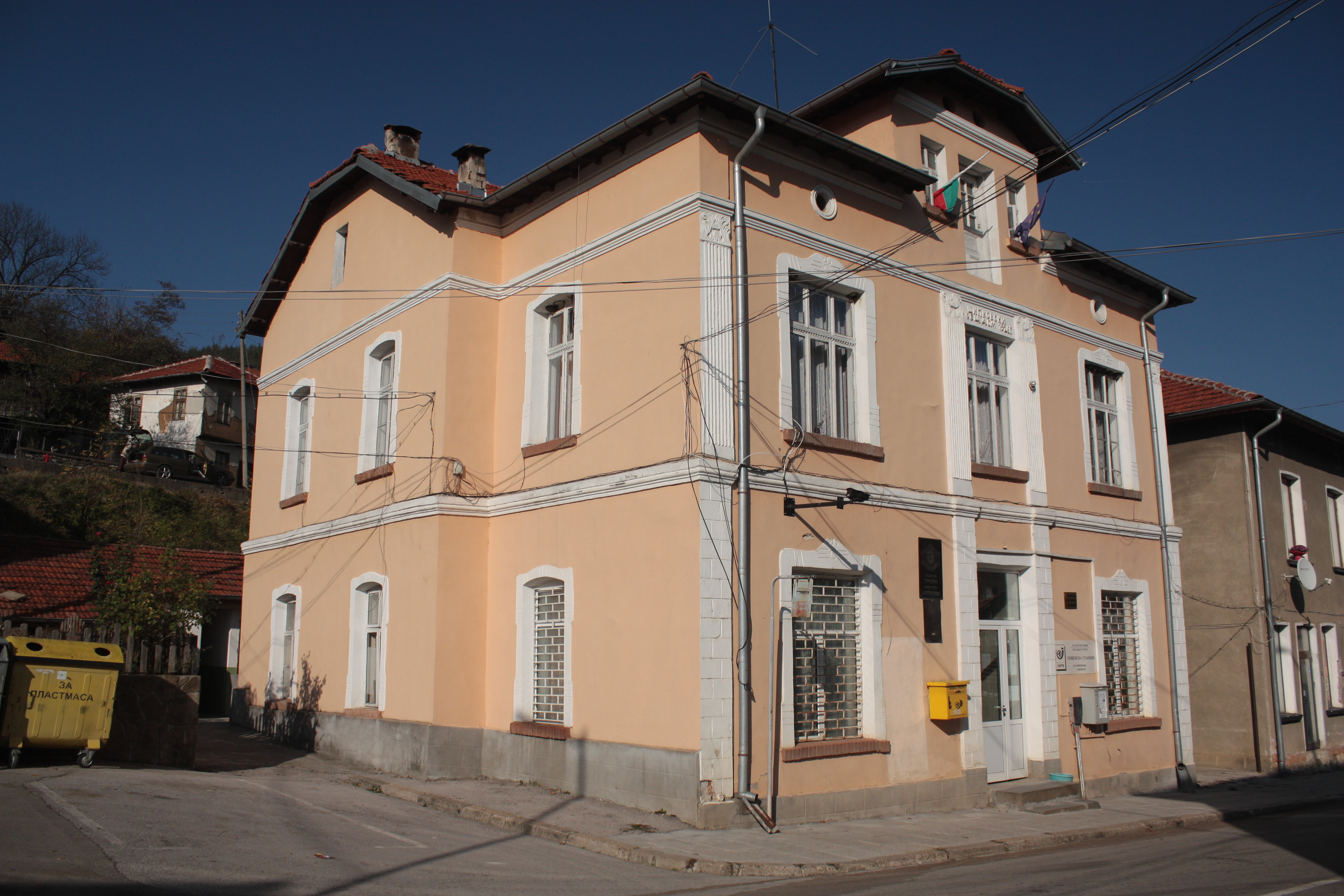
- Shipkovo townhall

- Location within Bulgaria
- Coordinates: 42.88°N 24.558°E
- Country: Bulgaria
- Province: Lovech Province
- Municipality: Troyan
- Time zone: UTC+2 (EET)
  - Summer (DST): UTC+3 (EEST)
- Postal code: 5663

Shipkovo is a village in Troyan Municipality, Lovech Province, central northern Bulgaria. The village is known for its mineral thermal spring.

== Geography ==
The village of Shipkovo is located in the Balkan Mountains, 20 km west of Troyan, and is known as a place for Balneotherapy since ancient times with a hot mineral spring (32 °C / up to 10 liters per second) in the resort of the same name, about 2 km from the village.
