= Troyan Municipality =

Troyan Municipality Община Троян
- Municipality
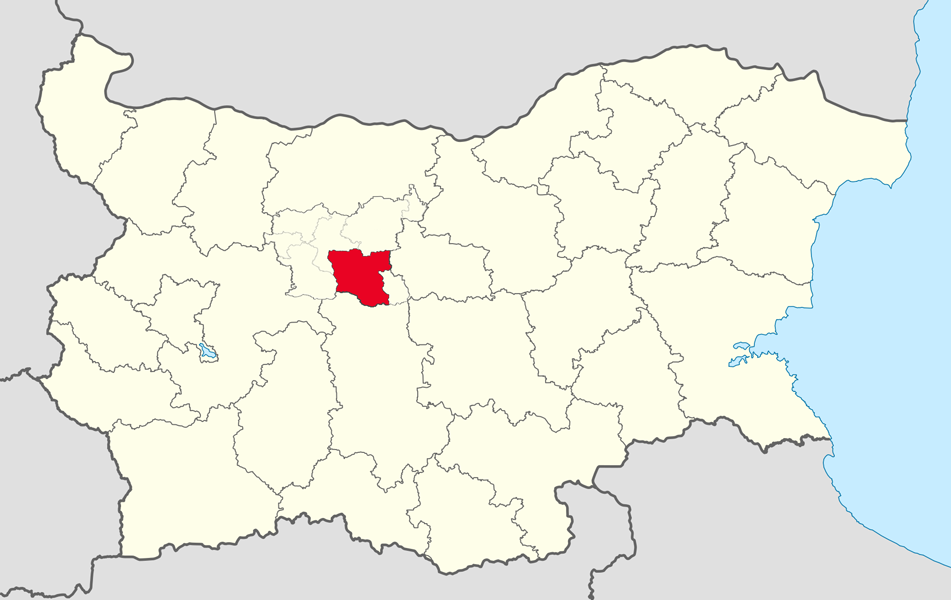
- Troyan Municipality within Bulgaria and Lovech Province.
- Coordinates: 42°52′N 24°40′E
- Country: Bulgaria
- Province (Oblast): Lovech
- Admin. centre (Obshtinski tsentar): Troyan

Area
  - Total: 888.85 km^{2} (343.19 sq mi)

Population (December 2009)
  - Total: 33,827
  - Density: 38.057/km^{2} (98.567/sq mi)
- Time zone: UTC+2 (EET)
  - Summer (DST): UTC+3 (EEST)

Troyan Municipality (Bulgarian: Община Троян) is a municipality (obshtina) in Lovech Province, Central-North Bulgaria, located from the northern slopes of the central Stara planina mountain to the area of the Fore-Balkan. It is named after its administrative centre - the town of Troyan.

The municipality embraces a territory of 888.85 km^{2} (343.19 sq mi) with a population of 33,827 inhabitants, as of December 2009.

The area is best known with the Troyan Monastery - the third biggest in Bulgaria, and the north approach to Beklemeto Pass, also known as Troyan Pass, which is one of the connections between the north and south parts of the country.

== Settlements ==
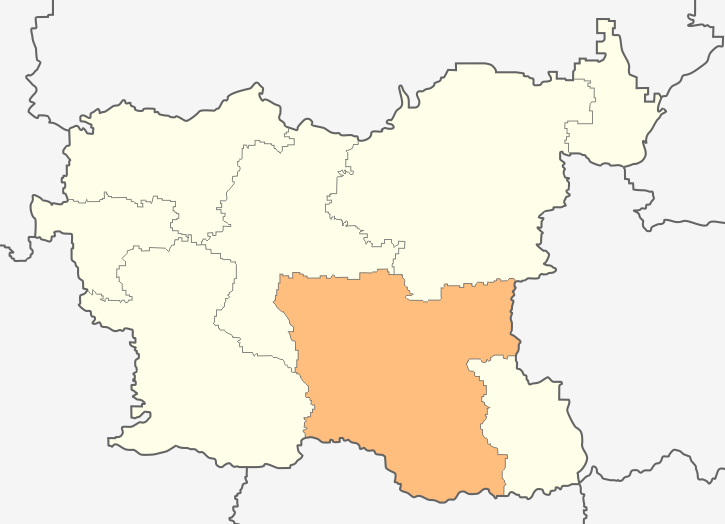
Troyan Municipality within Lovech Province

Troyan Municipality includes the following 22 places (towns are shown in bold):

| Town/Village | Cyrillic | Population (December 2009) |
|---|---|---|
| **Troyan** | **Троян** | 21,997 |
| Balabansko | Балабанско | 174 |
| Balkanets | Балканец | 242 |
| Beli Osam | Бели Осъм | 710 |
| Belish | Белиш | 203 |
| Borima | Борима | 897 |
| Cherni Osam | Черни Осъм | 873 |
| Chiflik | Чифлик | 324 |
| Debnevo | Дебнево | 764 |
| Dobrodan | Добродан | 348 |
| Dalbok Dol | Дълбок дол | 365 |
| Golyama Zhelyazna | Голяма Желязна | 654 |
| Gorno Trape | Горно Трапе | 207 |
| Gumoshtnik | Гумощник | 145 |
| Kaleytsa | Калейца | 653 |
| Lomets | Ломец | 291 |
| Oreshak | Орешак | 2,246 |
| Patreshko | Патрешко | 83 |
| Staro Selo | Старо село | 233 |
| Shipkovo | Шипково | 820 |
| Terziysko | Терзийско | 386 |
| Vrabevo | Врабево | 876 |
| Total | | 33,827 |

== Demography ==
The following table shows the change of the population during the last four decades.

Troyan Municipality
| Year | 1975 | 1985 | 1992 | 2001 | 2005 | 2007 | 2009 | 2011 |
| Population | 47,231 | 45,089 | 41,284 | 37,348 | 35,214 | 34,718 | 33,827 | ... |
Sources: Census 2001, Census 2011, „pop-stat.mashke.org“,

=== Religion ===
According to the latest Bulgarian census of 2011, the religious composition, among those who answered the optional question on religious identification, was the following:

Religious composition of Troyan Municipality
| Orthodox Christianity | 88.6% |
| Catholicism | 0.7% |
| Protestantism | 0.9% |
| Islam | 2.2% |
| No religion | 2.2% |
| Prefer not to answer, others and indefinable | 5.4% |

== See also ==
- Provinces of Bulgaria
- Municipalities of Bulgaria
- List of cities and towns in Bulgaria
