= Debnevo =

Debnevo Добродан]
- Village
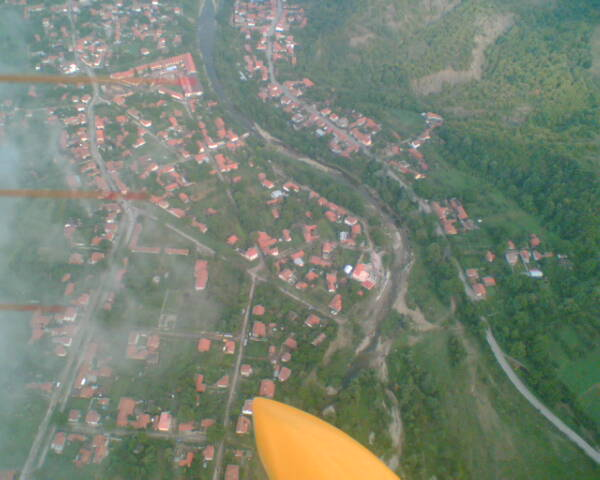
- Aerial view of the village

- Location within Bulgaria
- Coordinates: 42.9500°N 24.8500°E
- Country: Bulgaria
- Province: Lovech Province
- Municipality: Troyan
- Time zone: UTC+2 (EET)
  - Summer (DST): UTC+3 (EEST)

Debnevo is a village in Troyan Municipality, Lovech Province, northern Bulgaria.
