= Krassimir Ivandjiiski =

Bulgarian journalist

Krassimir Ivanov Ivandjiiski
- Born: June 15, 1947 (age 79); Vrabevo, PR Bulgaria
- Education: Warsaw School of Economics (B.Sc, M.Sc)
- Occupations: Publisher; Editor; Journalist
- Spouse: Joanna Morawska
- Children: Daniel Ivandjiiski
- Website: Strogo Sekretno (Top Secret)

Krassimir Ivanov Ivandjiiski (Bulgarian: Красимир Иванов Иванджийски, born 15 June 1947) is a former Soviet-era Bulgarian Ministry of Foreign Trade official who, since 1994, has been the publisher and editor-in-chief of the Bulgarian political news website, Strogo Sekretno (Bulgarian: Строго секретно; English "Top Secret"). Krassimir is also the father of Daniel Ivandjiiski, founder of the U.S.-based financial right-wing website, Zero Hedge.

== Career ==
Ivandjiiski was born on 15 June 1947 in Vrabevo, Bulgaria. He graduated from the English college in Sofia in 1966 and, in 1971, graduated from the Warsaw University of Planning and Economics with an M.Sc. in Foreign Trade. From 1973, Ivandjiiski worked at the Bulgarian Ministry of Foreign Trade. In 1974, he became a member of the International Organization of Journalists (an organisation labelled as a front for Soviet propaganda). In 1975, he was an international correspondent for the Rabotnichesko Delo newspaper. From 1978 to 1982, he was head of the Bulgarian Offices for Central Europe: Prague, Warsaw, and Vienna; and from 1985 to 1990, was head of the Bulgarian Offices for Africa: Zimbabwe and Ethiopia.

After the fall of communism in Eastern Europe, from 1991, Ivandjiiski states that he headed a political and economic think-tank group (the name of the group(s) are not given). From 1984 to 1994, he also states that he was a guest professor in geopolitics, geoeconomics and international relations (the names of the universities are not given).

Since 1994, Ivandjiiski has been the publisher and editor-in-chief of the website Strogo Sekretno (Bulgarian: Строго секретно; English "Top Secret"), and monthly publication Bulgarian Confidential. Strogo Sekretno describes itself as: "Above all, Top Secret is a national political newspaper. It is the only independent newspaper in Bulgaria, which is the only real alternative to manipulated mass media."

Strogo Sekretno has been criticized by New Republic writer Seth Hettena as antisemitic and promoting misinformation, citing the example of an article portraying the COVID-19 pandemic as a Western Zionist "act of bioterrorism". The American Jewish Congress criticized a statement in the article saying that:

“More than any other region of the planet, scientific researchers and investigative journalists alike throughout the Middle East appear to be fully abreast of the “Who” and “Why” behind this bioengineered coronavirus pandemic...The bottom line to the “Cio bono?” [sic] question is that Zionism always wins, while everyone always loses... China and Russia both lose. So does Iran. The US and UK will ultimately lose even though they might look like winners. India and Pakistan both lose. The entire Middle East loses again except Israel. Just watch how this pandemic evolves across the planet and we shall see who really started it from their safe haven.” (Note: The link to the article stating this content can be found at https://strogosekretno.com/index.php?p=newsroom&nid=9498)

In 2019, Ivandjiiski filed a criminal complaint in a court in Bulgaria against Seth Hettena, an American journalist who previously wrote about Zero Hedge, and its connections to Bulgaria; the complaint was dismissed by a court.

== Personal life ==
Ivandjiiski's profile on Strogo Sekretno (Bulgarian: Строго секретно; English "Top Secret"), describes him as: "Married, one son – leading world financial and economic expert", however, his son is not named. A September 2009 article by New York, stated that his son is Daniel Ivandjiiski, the founder of the U.S-based financial website, Zero Hedge. Litigation in 2019 reported Krassimir as Daniel's father.

A 27 March 2012 complaint, named Daniel K. Ivandjiiski of the website, Zero Hedge, as a co-conspirator in a civil suit alleging a short and distort stock manipulation scheme regarding the GEROVA Financial Group, in which Daniel was vindicated with the SEC prosecuting several major GEROVA investors and company executives in September 2015, who were sentenced to jail in 2017, named his father as Krassimir Ivandjiski, and re-printed translated material from the Strogo Sekretno website regarding his profile. The complaint stated that in March 2012, the owner of the zerohedge.com domain name, ABC Media Limited, was registered at the same Sofia, Bulgaria, P.O. Box 814, as the correspondence for strogosekretno.com website.

== See also ==
- Zero Hedge
- Daniel Ivandjiiski
