= Cherni Osam =

Cherni Osam Черни Осъм
- Village
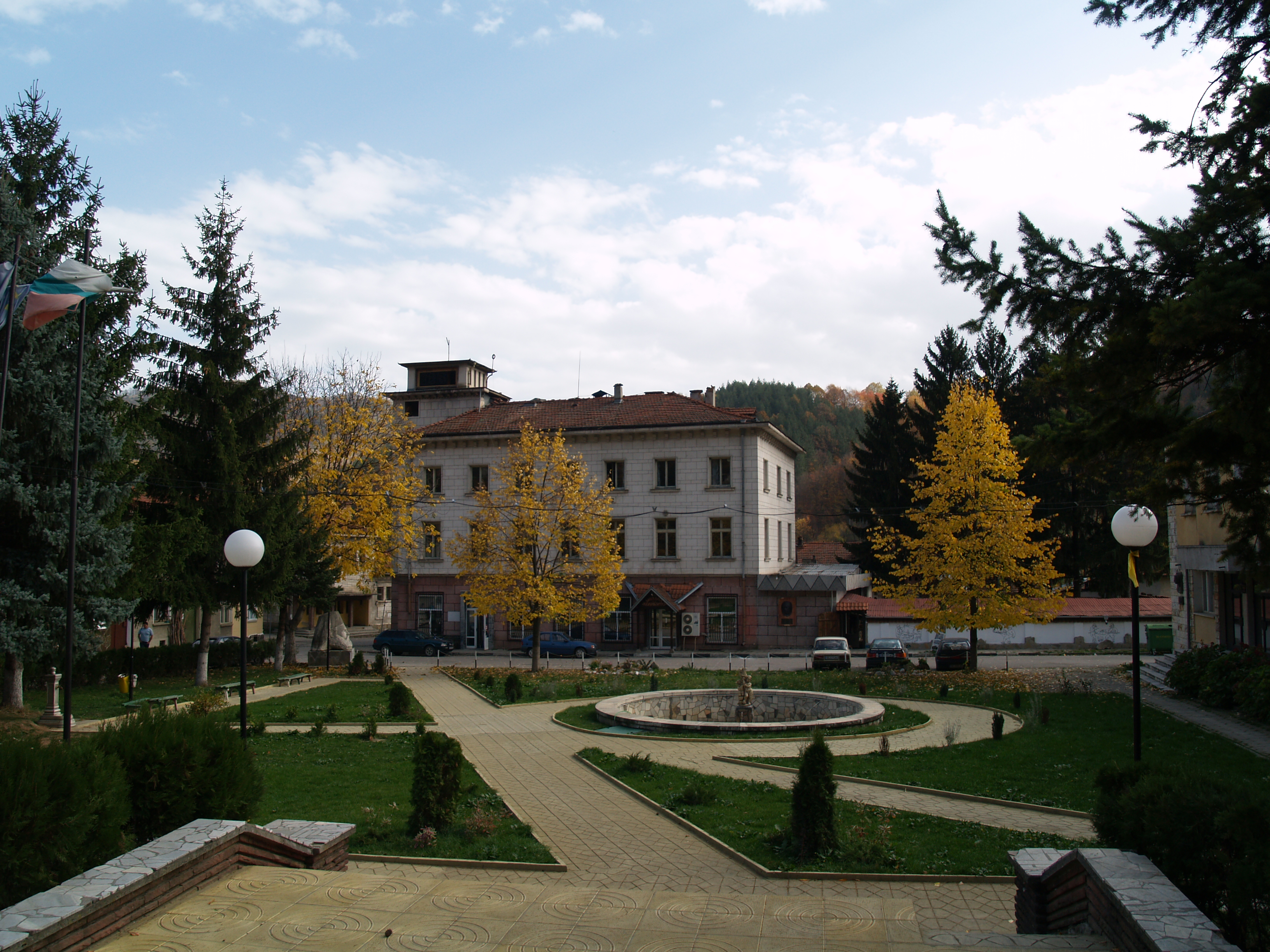
- Cherni Osam Central Square

- Location within Bulgaria
- Coordinates: 42.8333°N 24.7500°E
- Country: Bulgaria
- Province: Lovech Province
- Municipality: Troyan
- Elevation: 550 m (1,800 ft)

Population
  - Total: 935
- Time zone: UTC+2 (EET)
  - Summer (DST): UTC+3 (EEST)

Cherni Osam is a village in Troyan Municipality, Lovech Province, northern Bulgaria.

On September 8, 2012 the neighboring village of Zheravitsa was incorporated into the settlement.
