= Kaleytsa =

Village in Lovech Province, Bulgaria

Kaleitsa Калейца
- Village
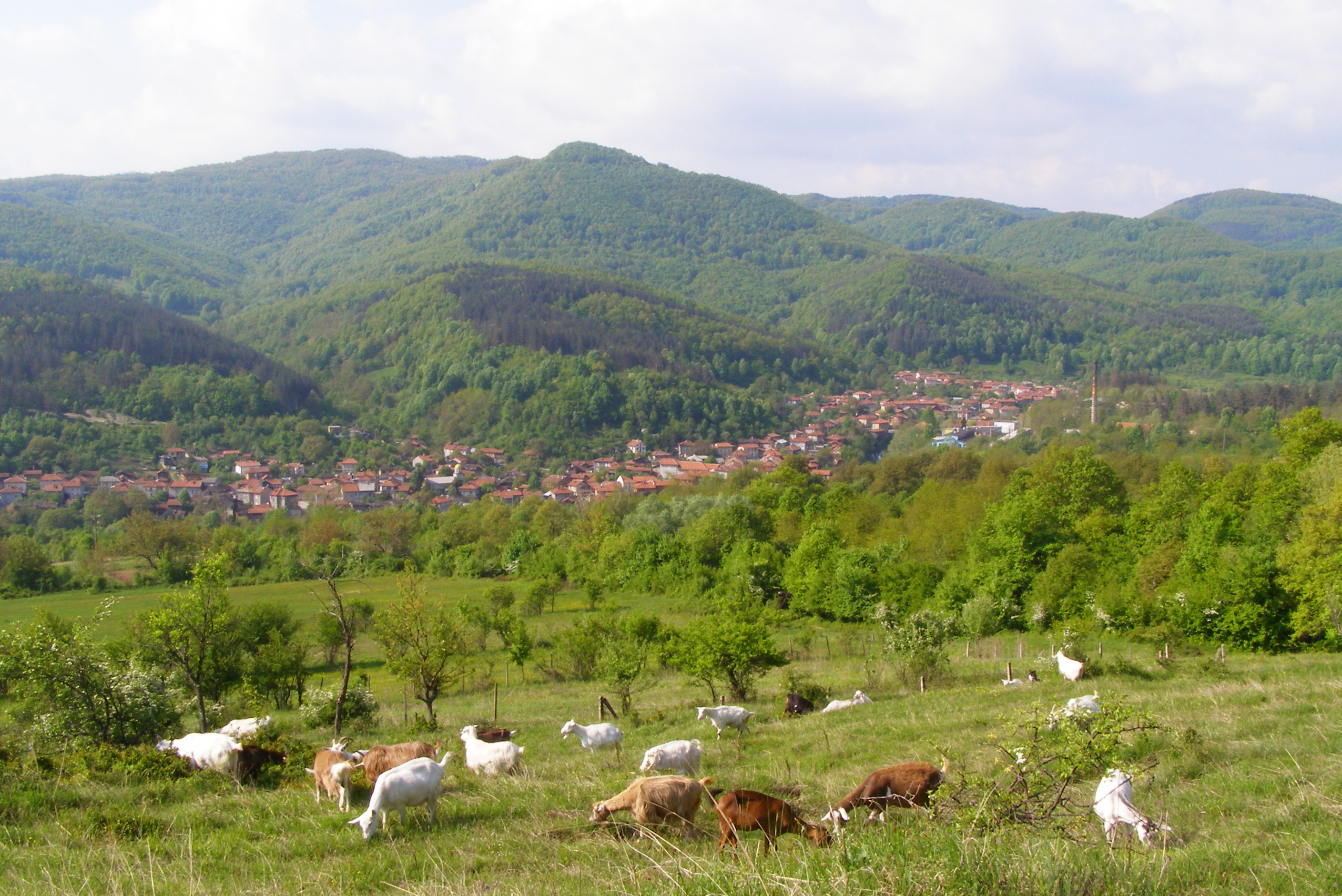
- Goats grazing in a field, overlooking Kaleytsa

- Location within Bulgaria
- Coordinates: 42.9269°N 24.6714°E
- Country: Bulgaria
- Province: Lovech Province
- Municipality: Troyan
- Time zone: UTC+2 (EET)
  - Summer (DST): UTC+3 (EEST)

Kaleytsa is a village in Troyan Municipality, Lovech Province, North-Western Bulgaria.

A small river runs through the village, named Komanska, which is the tributary of the Osam. The village also contains a small porcelain factory.
