= Balkanets =

Balkanets Балканец
- Village
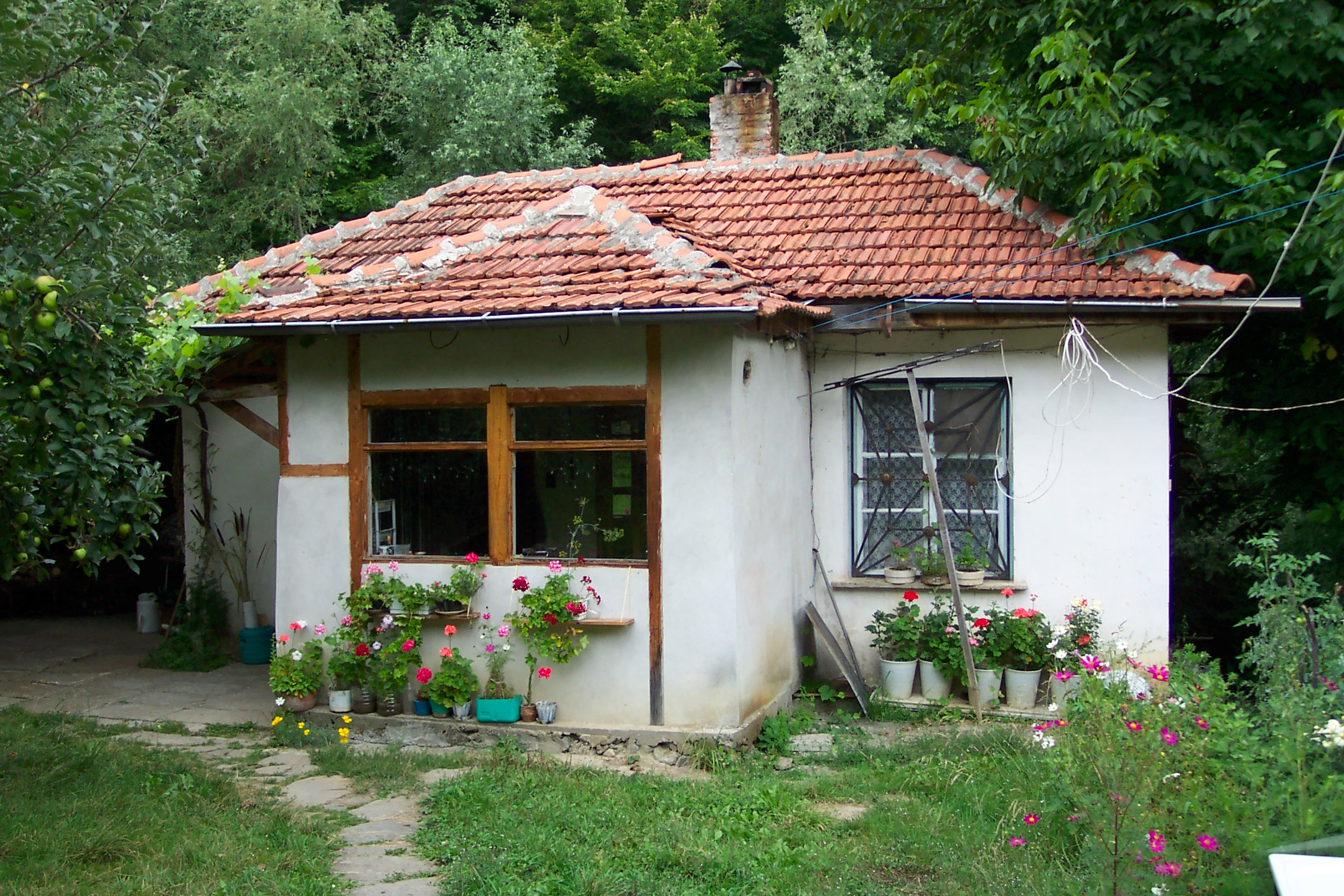
- Beautiful old house in the village of Balkanetz

- Location within Bulgaria
- Coordinates: 42.8500°N 24.6667°E
- Country: Bulgaria
- Province: Lovech Province
- Municipality: Troyan
- Time zone: UTC+2 (EET)
  - Summer (DST): UTC+3 (EEST)

Balkanets is a village in Troyan Municipality, Lovech Province, northern Bulgaria.
