= Gorno Trape =

Gorno Trape Горно Трапе
- Village
- Location within Bulgaria
- Coordinates: 42°52′28″N 24°39′32″E
- Country: Bulgaria
- Province: Lovech Province
- Municipality: Troyan
- Time zone: UTC+2 (EET)
  - Summer (DST): UTC+3 (EEST)

Gorno Trape is a village in Troyan Municipality, Lovech Province, northern Bulgaria.
