= Military Geographic Service (Bulgarian Army) =

Military Geographic Centre's logo

The Military Geographic Service is a unit of the Bulgarian Armed Forces responsible for meeting the obligations of the Bulgarian Ministry of Defense in the field of cartography and geographic information. This includes the mapping and production of topographic maps of 1:25000 and lesser scale, maintaining the national geodetic network, and providing topographic and geographic data, digital products and information to the Armed Forces, government institutions and private users. According to the 2006 Law of Geodesy and Cartography, the areas subject to such mapping comprise the country’s territory as well as the area of the Bulgarian base in Antarctica.

The mapping activities of the Service are carried out by its Military Geographic Centre based in the city of Troyan in northern Bulgaria. Among the products of the Centre is the 2009 Bulgarian topographic map of Livingston Island, Desolation Island, Half Moon Island, Greenwich Island, Aitcho Islands, Robert Island, Rugged Island, Snow Island and Smith Island in the South Shetland Islands, Antarctica, and the 2016 large scale topographic map of the Bulgarian Antarctic base St. Kliment Ohridski.
