= Staro Selo, Lovech Province =

Staro Selo Старо село
- Village
- Location within Bulgaria
- Country: Bulgaria
- Province: Lovech Province
- Municipality: Troyan
- Time zone: UTC+2 (EET)
  - Summer (DST): UTC+3 (EEST)

Staro Selo is a village in Troyan Municipality, Lovech Province, northern Bulgaria.
