= Daniel Ivandjiiski =

Bulgarian investment banker, trader, blogger (born 1978)

- Born: Daniel Krassimirov Ivandjiiski; November 8, 1978 (age 48); Sofia, PR Bulgaria
- Other name: Tyler Durden (on Zero Hedge)
- Education: American College of Sofia; University of Pennsylvania
- Occupations: Investment banking; securities trading; financial blogging
- Employers: Jefferies & Company (2001–2004); Imperial Capital LLC (2004–2005); Miller Buckfire LLC (2005–2007); Wexford Capital LLC (2007–2008)
- Known for: Founder of Zero Hedge
- Spouse: Blair Allyson Kress (m. 2007; div. circa 2018)
- Father: Krassimir Ivandjiiski
- Website: www.zerohedge.com

Daniel Krassimirov Ivandjiiski (Bulgarian: Даниел Иванджийски, born 8 November 1978) is a Bulgarian-born, U.S.-based former investment banker and capital-markets trader, and currently financial blogger, who founded the website Zero Hedge in January 2009, and remains its publisher and main editor.

== Early life and education ==
Born in Sofia, Bulgaria, Ivandjiiski graduated from the American College of Sofia in 1997. He then moved to the United States, where he studied molecular biology at the University of Pennsylvania, to pursue a career in medicine, until 2001.

== Career ==
In July 2001, he joined New York investment bank, Jefferies & Co. He passed his securities exams in November 2001 (Series 7 and Series 63). In October 2004, he joined Los Angeles-based investment bank Imperial Capital LLC, before moving back to New York in May 2005 to join investment bank Miller Buckfire LLC.

While at Miller Buckfire, Ivandjiiski was charged by FINRA of gaining US$780 from an insider trade on 14–15 March 2006. On 3 September 2008, FINRA reached their decision, published on 11 September 2008, that Daniel K. Ivandjiiski was to be barred from "acting as a broker or otherwise associating with a broker-dealer firm," and from being a FINRA member.

In September 2007, before the FINRA ruling, Ivandjiiski moved to the Connecticut-based hedge fund Wexford Capital LLC, run by former Goldman Sachs traders. After the FINRA ruling, Ivandjiiski left Wexford Capital, and within a few weeks posted his first blog on the Zero Hedge site on 9 January 2009.

=== Zero Hedge ===
Ivandjiiski decided that he, and all other Zero Hedge contributors, would blog under the collective pseudonym "Tyler Durden" (a character from the book Fight Club). In March 2011, Time magazine ranked Zero Hedge as 9th in its 25 Best Financial Blogs.

The New Republic and New York magazine have identified Daniel Ivandjiiski as the founder of Zero Hedge. The New York article made assertions regarding Ivandjiiski's background, particularly his Bulgarian citizenship, his FINRA charge and lifetime ban from securities trading, and his father, Krassimir Ivandjiiski's, own controversial news and political website, Strogo Sekretno (Bulgarian: Строго секретно; English "Top Secret"), (Note: In the "About Us" page, Krassimir's translated website describes itself as: It is the only independent newspaper in Bulgaria, which is the only real alternative to manipulated mass media) and Krassimir's position in the pre-1990 Bulgarian-Soviet administration". (Note: As discussed in the Zero Hedge Wikipedia article, the site has been labeled by some as having a pro-Russian bias, and also point to editorial on Krassimir's Strogo Sekretno website as support)

On 29 April 2016, an ex-employee of Zero Hedge, Colin Lokey, who had joined a year earlier in 2015 from Seeking Alpha, gave an interview to Bloomberg, revealing Ivandjiiski, and San Francisco-based credit trader Tim Backshall, (Note: Tim Backshall is originally from the United Kingdom) as the main force behind Zero Hedge. The article confirmed various details about Daniel Ivandjiiski, including that he lives in a mansion in Mahwah, New Jersey, Lokey saying: "These two guys, who live a lifestyle you only dream of, are pretending to speak for you."

== Personal life ==
Ivandjiiski's father is the publicist and political news editor Krassimir Ivandjiiski. A 2020 article on Ivandjiski in The New Republic described him as a "wonderkind" who could speak several languages and was a virtuoso pianist.

Apart from a brief period in which Ivandjiiski worked for Los Angeles-based investment bank, Imperial Capital LLC, he has spent most of his time since living in the New York metropolitan area. He was married to Blair A. Kress in October 2007, and Bloomberg reported in 2016 that they lived in Mahwah, New Jersey; divorce was filed by Kress in 2018 citing "irreconcilable differences".
