= Borima =

Borima Борима
- Village
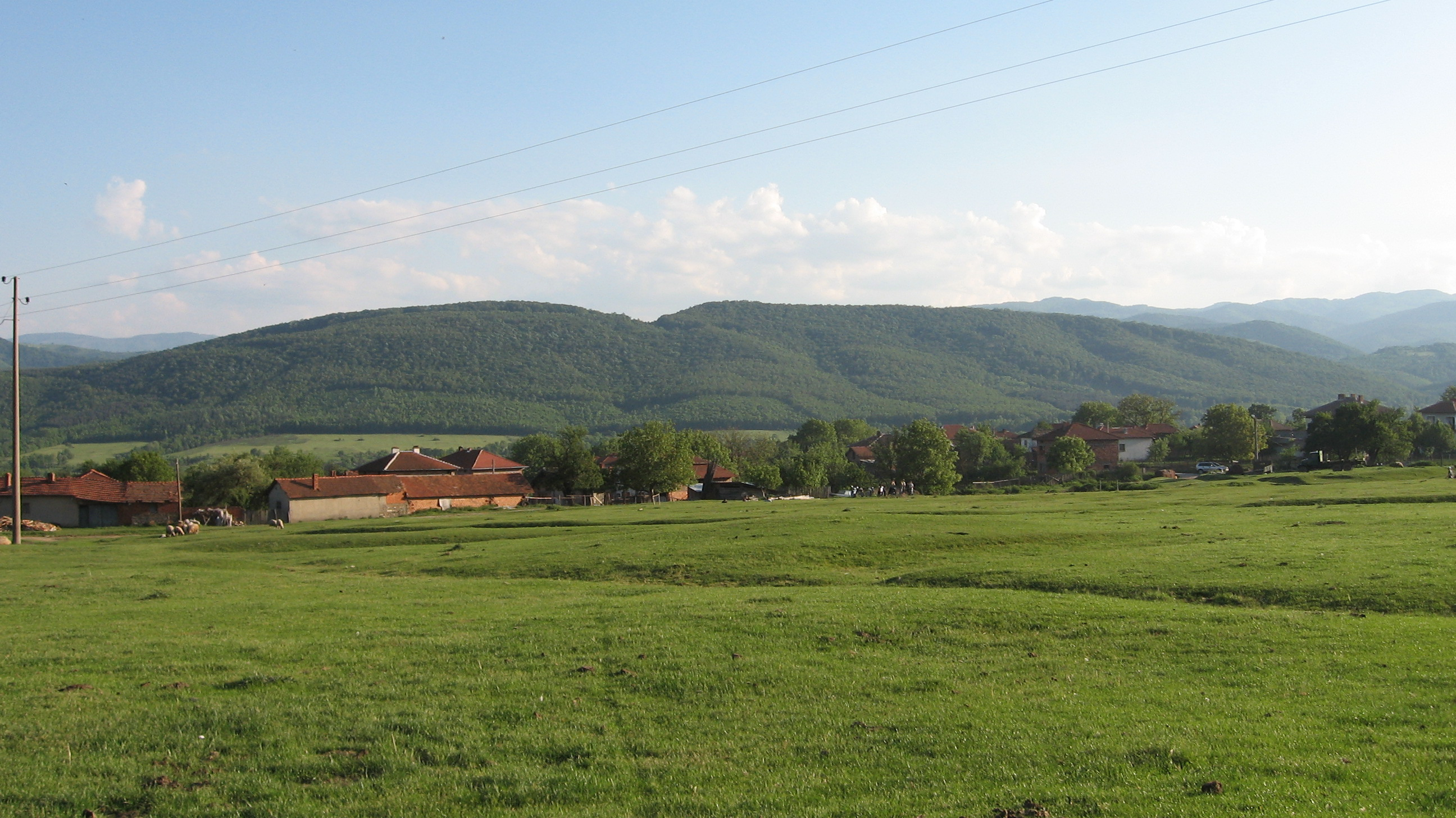
- Views of the fields

- Location within Bulgaria
- Coordinates: 42.9667°N 24.5667°E
- Country: Bulgaria
- Province: Lovech Province
- Municipality: Troyan
- Time zone: UTC+2 (EET)
  - Summer (DST): UTC+3 (EEST)

Borima is a village in Troyan Municipality, Lovech Province, northern Bulgaria.
