= Vrabevo =

Vrabevo Врабево
- Village
- Location within Bulgaria
- Coordinates: 42.9833°N 24.8167°E
- Country: Bulgaria
- Province: Lovech Province
- Municipality: Troyan
- Time zone: UTC+2 (EET)
  - Summer (DST): UTC+3 (EEST)

Vrabevo is a village in Troyan Municipality, Lovech Province, northern Bulgaria.
