= Miller Buckfire & Co. =

Investment banking firm

- Type: Subsidiary
- Industry: Investment banking
- Predecessor: Dresdner Kleinwort Wasserstein
- Founded: 2002
- Headquarters: Citigroup Center; New York, New York, United States
- Products: Corporate restructuring, Mergers and acquisitions
- Parent: Stifel Financial
- Website: www.millerbuckfire.com

Miller Buckfire & Co. is an investment banking firm that provides various advisory services, focused on corporate restructurings. In addition to its core restructuring business, the firm provides merger and acquisition advisory and valuation services as well as capital raising, and private placements of debt and equity. The firm specializes in the transportation, retail, media and communication, entertainment, power, food and consumer and financial services sectors. The firm is based in New York City.

The various investment bankers of Miller Buckfire collectively have represented more than 100 companies, restructured approximately $350 billion of debt, advised on over $19 billion of mergers and acquisitions and raised more than $60 billion in financing.

Since its founding in 2002, Miller Buckfire has served as restructuring advisers on several major bankruptcies including Caesars Entertainment Corporation, The City of Detroit, COFINA (in connection with the Puerto Rico bankruptcy), Seadrill, Rand Logistics, Calpine, Dura Automotive Systems, Dana Holding Corporation, General Growth Properties, Kmart, Mirant, Polaroid, Reader's Digest, Aeropostale, and The Weinstein Company.

== History ==
Miller Buckfire was founded in July 2002 as Miller Buckfire Lewis & Co. by Henry Miller, Kenneth Buckfire and Martin Lewis, who previously led the restructuring groups at Dresdner Kleinwort Wasserstein and Wasserstein Perella & Co. Following the acquisition of Wasserstein Perella by Dresdner Kleinwort Benson in 2001, Miller, Buckfire and Lewis found they were being precluded from many restructuring assignments due to conflicts with Dresdner's loan portfolio. As a result, the trio acquired their business through a spinout from Dresdner and launched Miller Buckfire as an independent firm.

In 2003, the firm added a fourth partner David Ying to form Miller Buckfire Lewis Ying & Co. but following the 2004 departure of Martin Lewis and the 2005 departure of David Ying, the name of the firm was shortened to its current Miller Buckfire & Co.

In 2007, Sal. Oppenheim acquired 10% of Miller Buckfire as part of a strategic partnership between the two firms.

Former American Express Chairman and CEO Harvey Golub was appointed Chairman of Miller Buckfire in October 2011.

In 2012, the company was acquired by Stifel Financial.
