= Beli Osam (village) =

Beli Osam Бели Осъм
- Village
- Location within Bulgaria
- Coordinates: 42.8500°N 24.6167°E
- Country: Bulgaria
- Province: Lovech Province
- Municipality: Troyan
- Time zone: UTC+2 (EET)
  - Summer (DST): UTC+3 (EEST)

Beli Osam is a village in Troyan Municipality, Lovech Province, northern Bulgaria.
