= Terziysko, Lovech Province =

Terzyisko Терзийско
- Village
- Location within Bulgaria
- Coordinates: 42.9000°N 24.6000°E
- Country: Bulgaria
- Province: Lovech Province
- Municipality: Troyan
- Time zone: UTC+2 (EET)
  - Summer (DST): UTC+3 (EEST)

Terzyisko is a village located in Troyan Municipality, Lovech Province, northern Bulgaria.
