= Global Forest Coalition =

Environmental organization

- Predecessor: Forest Working Group
- Formation: 2000
- Purpose: Prevention of Forest Loss
- Headquarters: Utrecht, Netherlands
- Executive director: Simone Lovera
- Website: globalforestcoalition.org

The Global Forest Coalition (GFC) is a coalition of NGOs and indigenous peoples organizations engaged in the global policy debate related to forests.

== History ==
The Global Forest Coalition was set up in 2000 by 19 groups from all over the world. It succeeds the informal network Forest Working Group, which was established in 1995 to advocate for social justice issues and the underlying causes of forest loss to be addressed in international forest policy debates. Simone Lovera is presently [when?] serving as the executive director of the Coalition.

== Objective and activities ==
The mission of the Global Forest Coalition is to advocate the rights of forest-dependent peoples as a basis for forest policy and addressing the direct and underlying causes of deforestation and forest degradation. To do so, the coalition facilitates effective and equitable participation of these groups in global policy for a related to forests and monitors the implementation of agreed policy commitments. The three primary targets of the coalition are the United Nations Forum on Forests, the Framework Convention on Climate Change and the Convention on Biological Diversity.

== Forest Working Group ==
The Forest Working Group was an informal network of 15–20 NGOs established in 1995, predating the Global Forest Coalition. It included NGOs from all regions that participated in international forest policy meetings and organized joint advocacy campaigns on issues such as indigenous peoples' rights, socially-just forest policy, and underlying causes of forest loss.

== See also ==
- Reforestation
