= GEROVA Financial Group =

International reinsurance company

GEROVA Financial Group, Ltd (NYSE: GFC) is an international reinsurance company with operating insurance subsidiaries in Bermuda, Barbados, and Ireland.

== Acquisitions and name changes ==
Gerova was previously named Asia Special Situations Acquisition Corporation. The name was changed in February 2010.

As Asia Special Situations Acquisition Corporation, the company attempted to acquire White Energy, an Australian coal mining firm, in 2009. However, that deal did not occur.

On December 7, 2010, Gerova announced agreements, subject to approval, to acquire Seymour Pierce, a small London investment bank and Ticonderoga Securities, a New York securities broker. If the transactions close, Gerova would use the Seymour Pierce name.
