= Troyan =

Troyan Троян
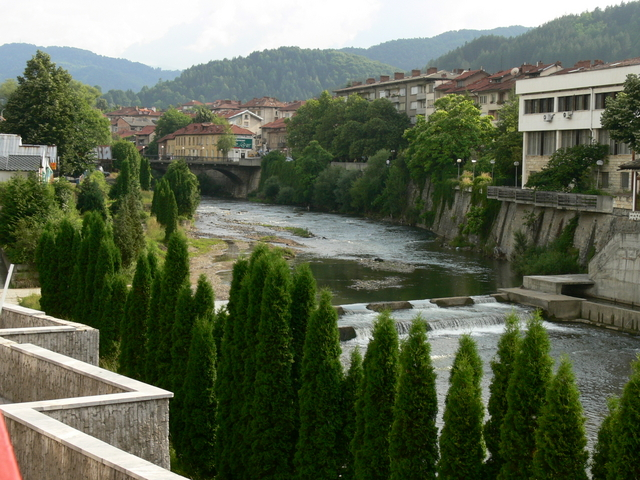
- White Osum river running through the town

- Coat of arms

- Location of Troyan
- Coordinates: 42°52′58.8″N 24°43′1.2″E
- Country: Bulgaria
- Province (Oblast): Lovech

Government
  - Mayor: Donka Mihaylova (BSP)

Area
  - City: 60.243 km^{2} (23.260 sq mi)
- Elevation: 380 m (1,250 ft)

Population (2021)
  - City: 18,449
  - Density: 306.24/km^{2} (793.17/sq mi)
  - Urban: 27,687
- Time zone: UTC+2 (EET)
  - Summer (DST): UTC+3 (EEST)
- Postal Code: 5600
- Area code: 0670
- Website: Official website

Troyan (Bulgarian: Троян pronounced [troˈjan]) is a town remembering the name of Roman Emperor Trajan, in Lovech Province in central Bulgaria. It is the administrative centre of the homonymous Troyan Municipality. The town is about 162 kilometres (101 miles) from the national capital Sofia. The Beli Osam river passes through the heart of the town. The 2021 Census indicates that the population of Troyan was 18,449 inhabitants. The ethnic distribution of the inhabitants (as of 2009) is ethnic Bulgarians (87.29%), with minorities being Roma (1.23%) and Turks (1.03%). Donka Mihaylova of Bulgarian Socialist Party has been the town's mayor since 2011.

== History ==
Troyan was named a town in 1868, when it developed as a craft center for the region. After the liberation it grew slowly. A spark in the town growth was the creation of a small water electrical plant and textile factories. In 1948, the town was connected to the railway Lovech – Levski – Svishtov. In time, factories producing electrical motors, electrotechnical products, building machines, wool and furniture developed in the town.

== Geography ==
The town is about 162 kilometres (101 miles) away from the country capital Sofia. The river of Beli Osam passes through the heart of the town.

=== Nature ===
The Troyan region is home to three National Reserves: Kozia Stena, Steneto and Severen Jendem, part of the larger Central Balkan National Park. The reserves are rich in interesting rock formations, waterfalls and wild life. Most of the interesting spots are tourist-accessible.

== Culture ==
The Troyan region is home to the cultural and historical site of the Troyan Monastery. August 15 is the day of the Monastery's Patron Saint, when thousands of people from the country gather to celebrate and see a unique icon of Mary. The icon is unique in that Mary has three hands made of silver. The origins of the icon are unknown but there are many stories, some of which involve miracles.

The town is famous for its traditional pottery, probably developed partly as a result of the qualities of the local clay soil. Pottery was a main source of income for the local craftsmen during the Bulgarian Renaissance age. Now handmade pottery items are sold as souvenirs to tourists. Fine examples of traditional pottery can be seen in the town's museum, across from the municipal building.

Also notable are the Nunki Complex and the St Paraskeva Church, both built in the first half of the 19th century.

The production of premium quality plum brandy (rakia) has become a part of the local culture. In connection with this, the town holds the annual Festival of the Plum in the autumn. Plum brandy from Troyan has gained national and international acclaim at major showcases. Troyan Plum Rakia holds a Protected Geographical Indication within the European Union, and remains a symbol of Bulgarian traditional culture and craftsmanship in rakia-making.

The official day of Troyan is October 14, the day of the town's patron saint, St Petka Paraskeva.

Troyan Peak in Tangra Mountains on Livingston Island in the South Shetland Islands is named after the town.

== Population ==
The table below shows the changes of the city's population in the post-World War II years (1946–2009)

Historical population

Year	Pop.	±%
1946	5,206	—
1956	9,946	+91.0%
1965	19,005	+91.1%
1975	23,708	+24.7%

Year	Pop.	±%
1985	26,109	+10.1%
1992	25,104	−3.8%
2001	23,332	−7.1%
2005	22,357	−4.2%

Year	Pop.	±%
2015	20,280	−9.3%
2021	21,884	+7.9%
2023	21,835	−0.2%

== Industry ==
Troyan is the home of the Actavis generic pharmaceuticals plant as well as the light machinery factories Elma and Mashstroi. There is located also plywood mill Welde. Another major industry is the famous plum brandy (slivova rakia) production brewery Vinprom-Troyan.

== Notable people ==
- Stanimir Belomazhev, three-times European champion and double World vice-champion in ski orienteering
- Petar Dachev, long jumper, gold medallist at the 2000 European Athletics Indoor Championships
- Lora Hristova, biathelete, bronze medalist at the 2026 Winter Olympics
- Vladimir Iliev, biathlete

== Schools ==
- Kliment Ohridski Secondary School
- Vasil Levski Secondary School
- Technical High School of Troyan
- Art and Crafts High School
- Ivan Hadgiiski Primary School
- Otets Paisii Primary School
- St. St. Cyril and Methodius Elementary School
- Christo Botev Elementary School

== Institutions ==
- Military Geographic Centre of the Bulgarian Armed Forces
- Institute for Mountain Agriculture, part of the National Centre for Agricultural Sciences

== Honour ==
Troyan Peak on Livingston Island in the South Shetland Islands, Antarctica is named after Troyan.

== Twin towns – sister cities ==
Troyan is twinned with:

- Dojran, North Macedonia
- Ellwangen, Germany
- Pernes-les-Fontaines, France
- Vigneux-sur-Seine, France

== Gallery ==
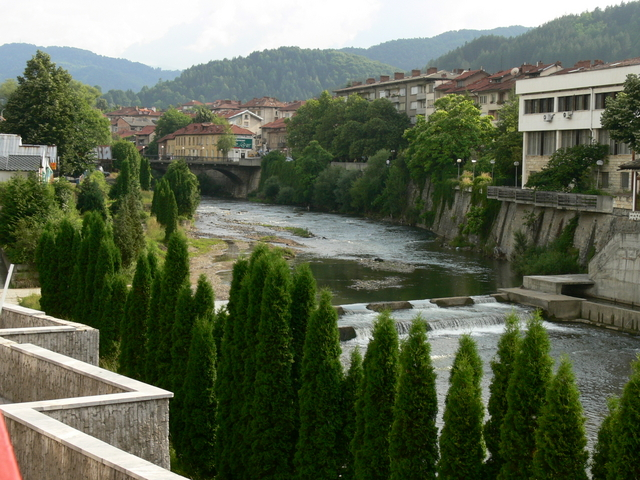

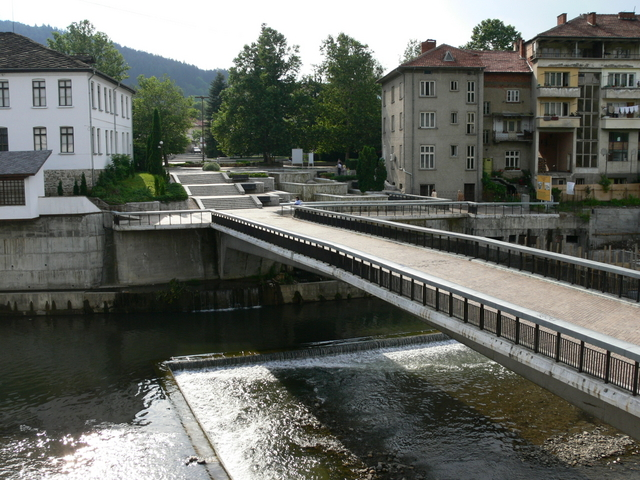

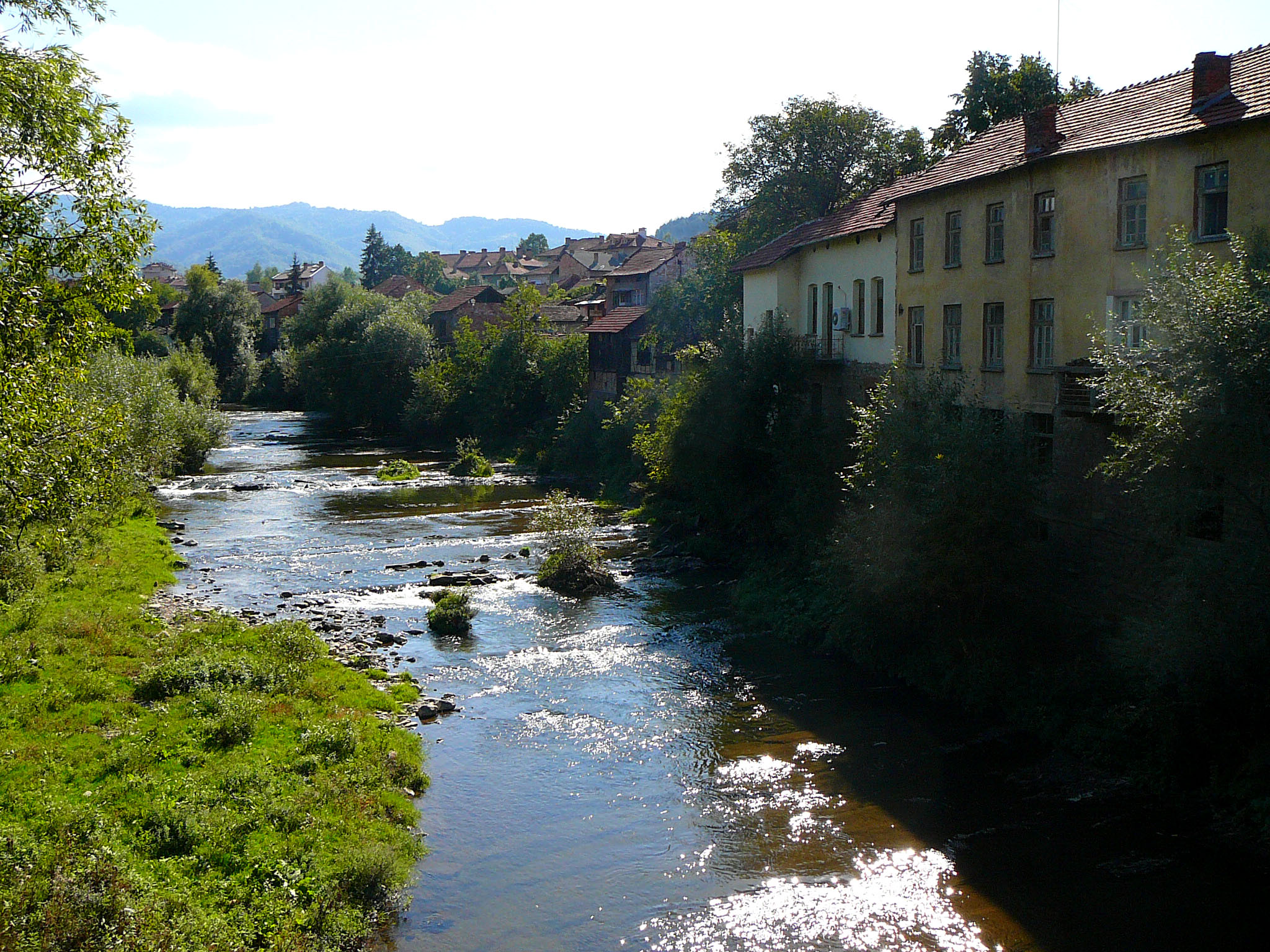

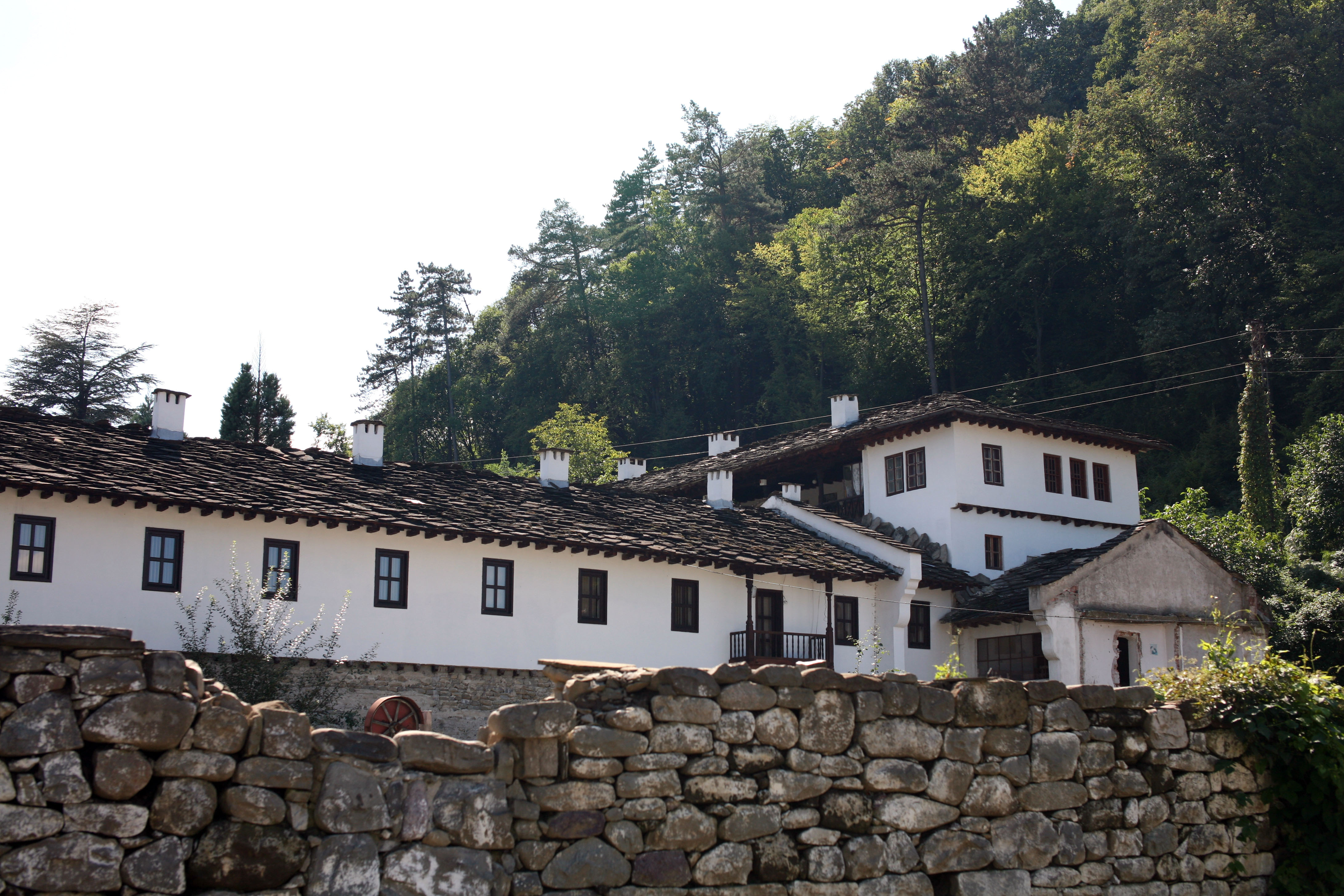

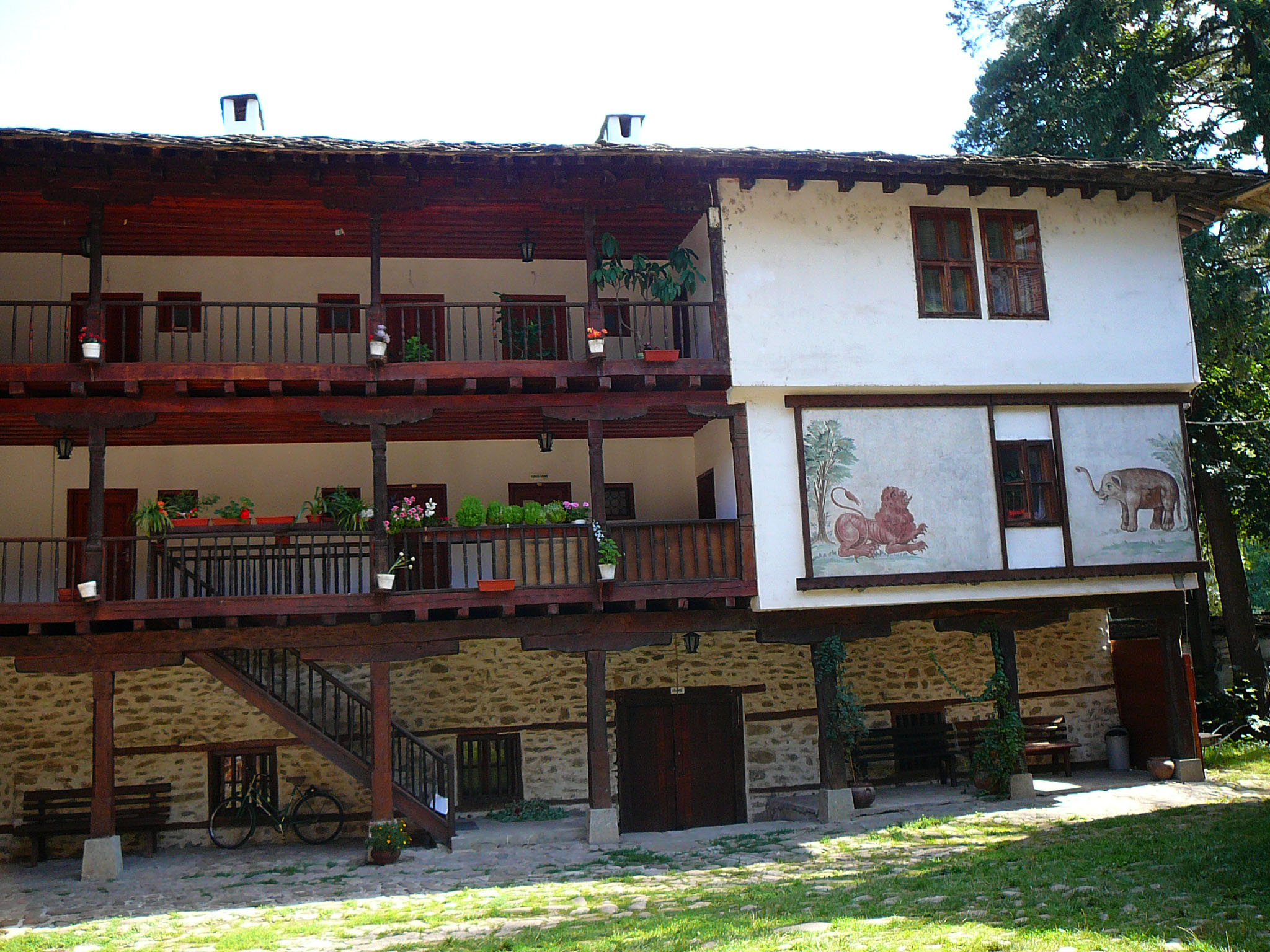

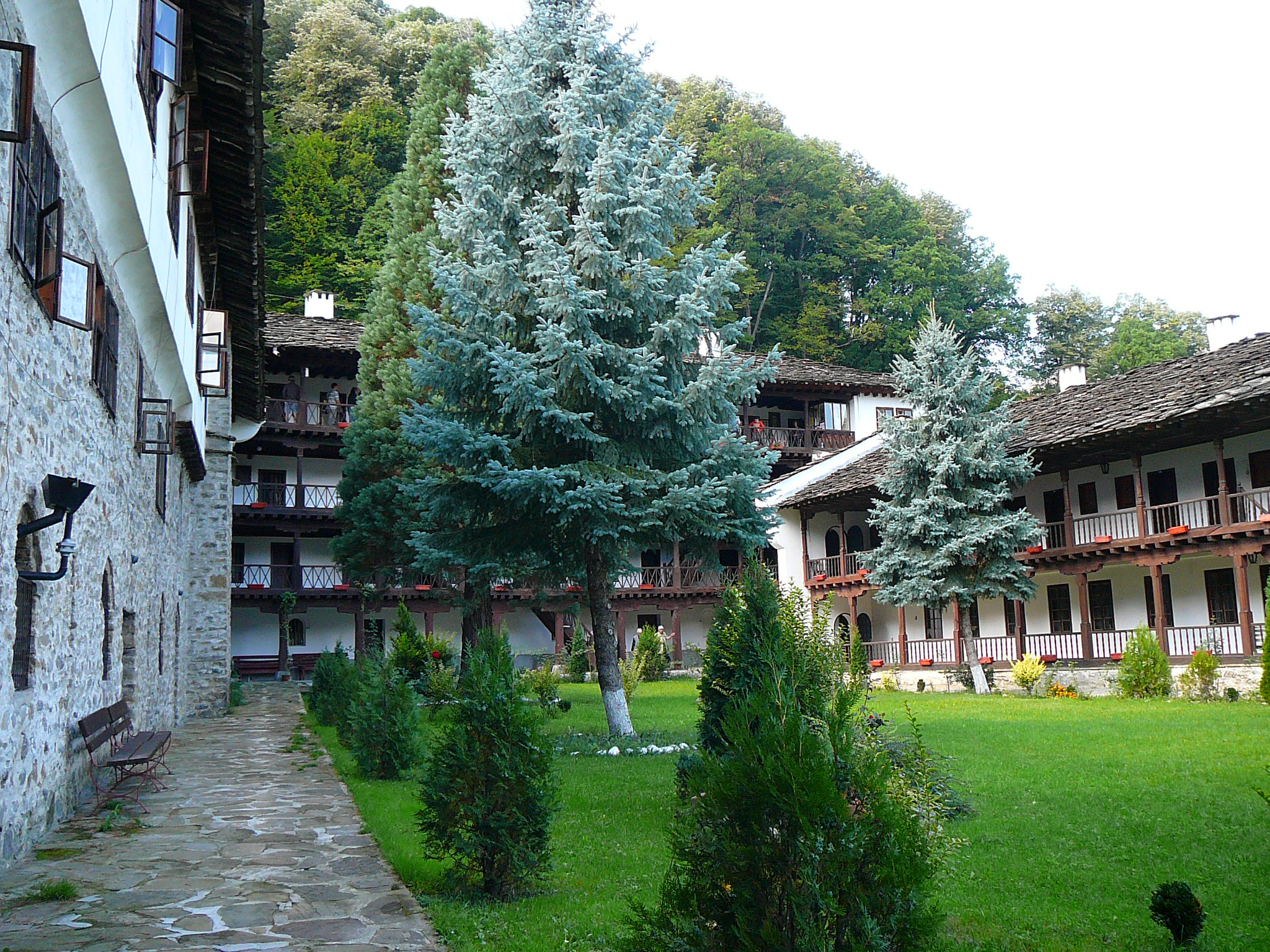

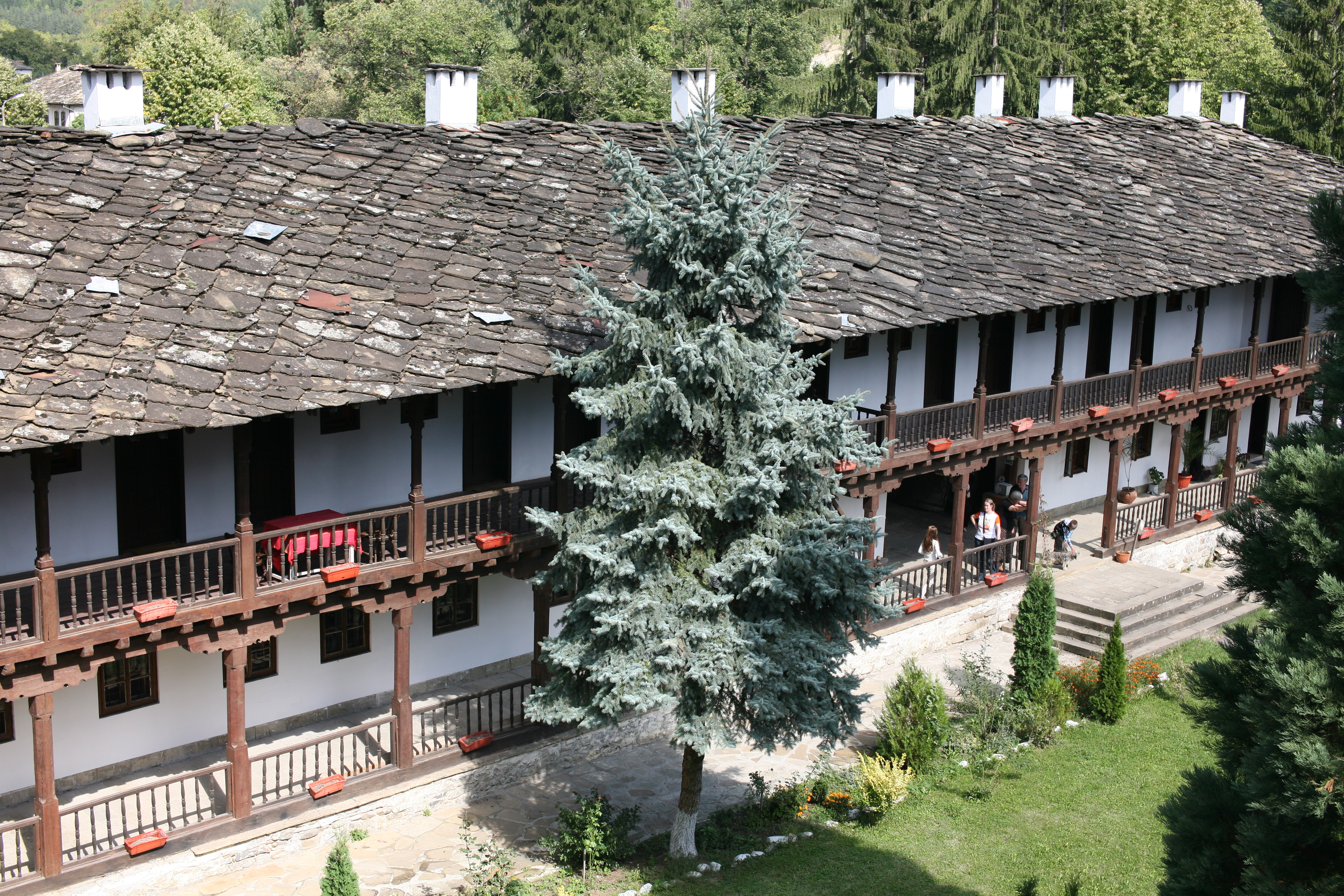

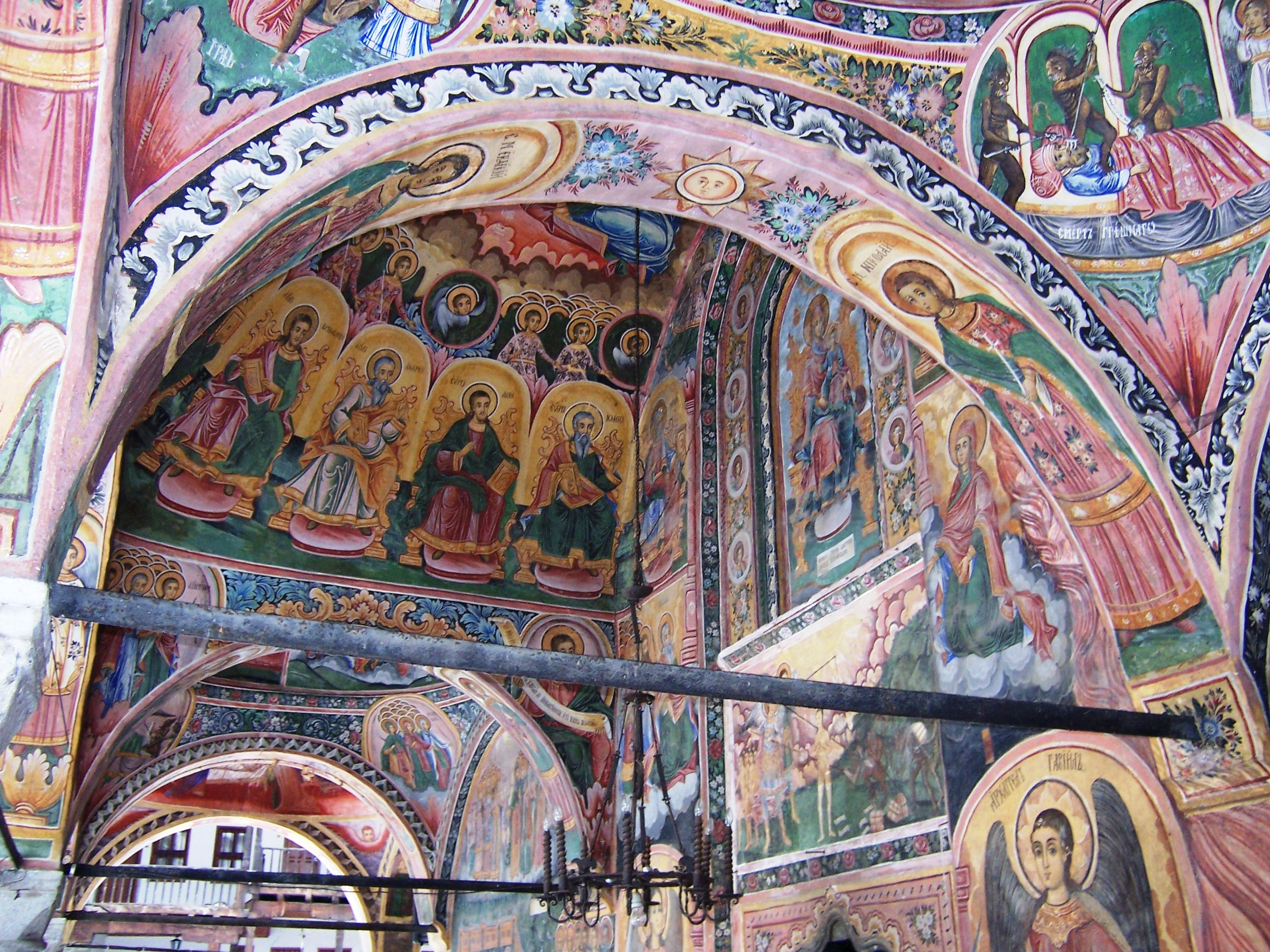

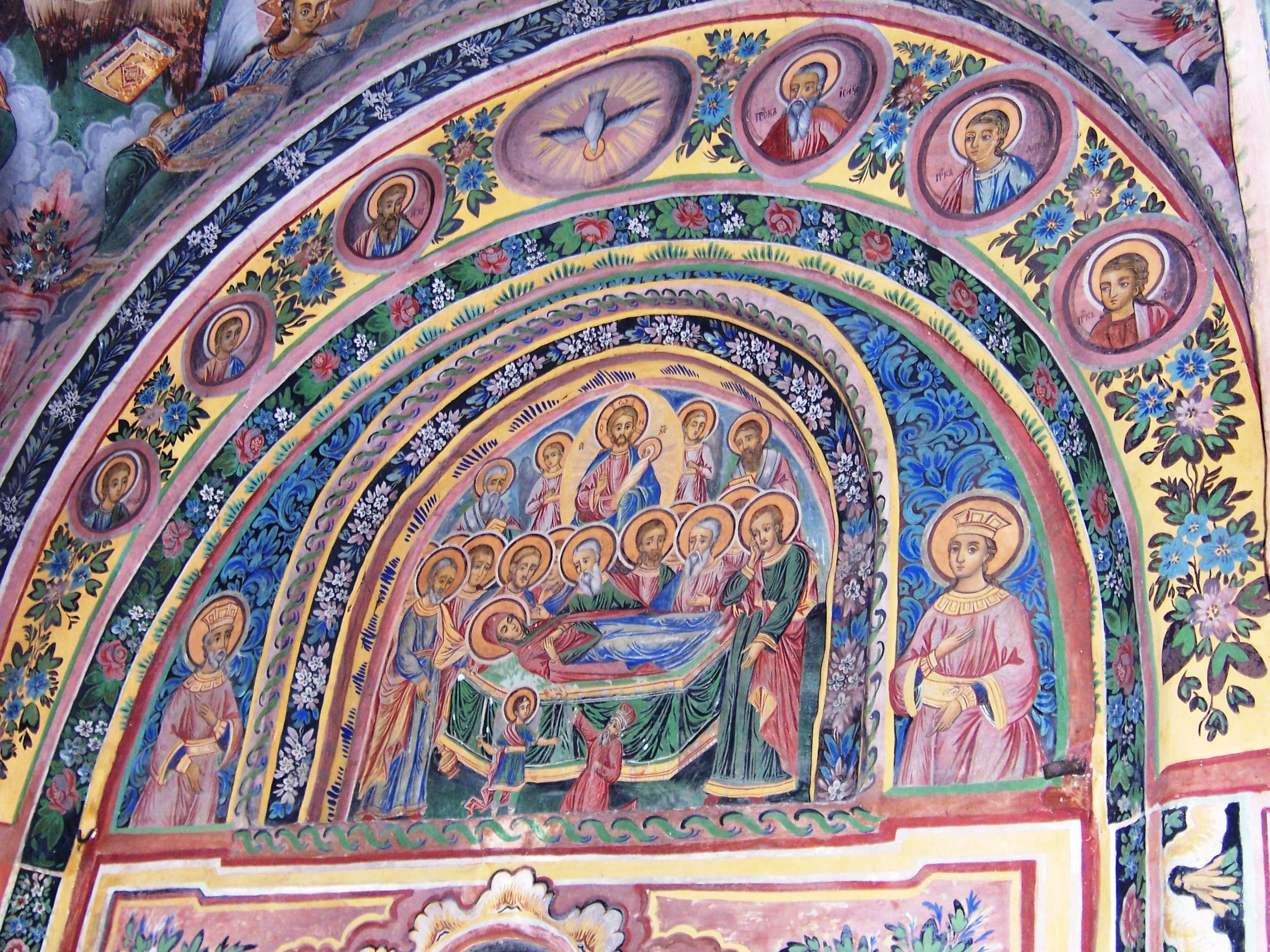

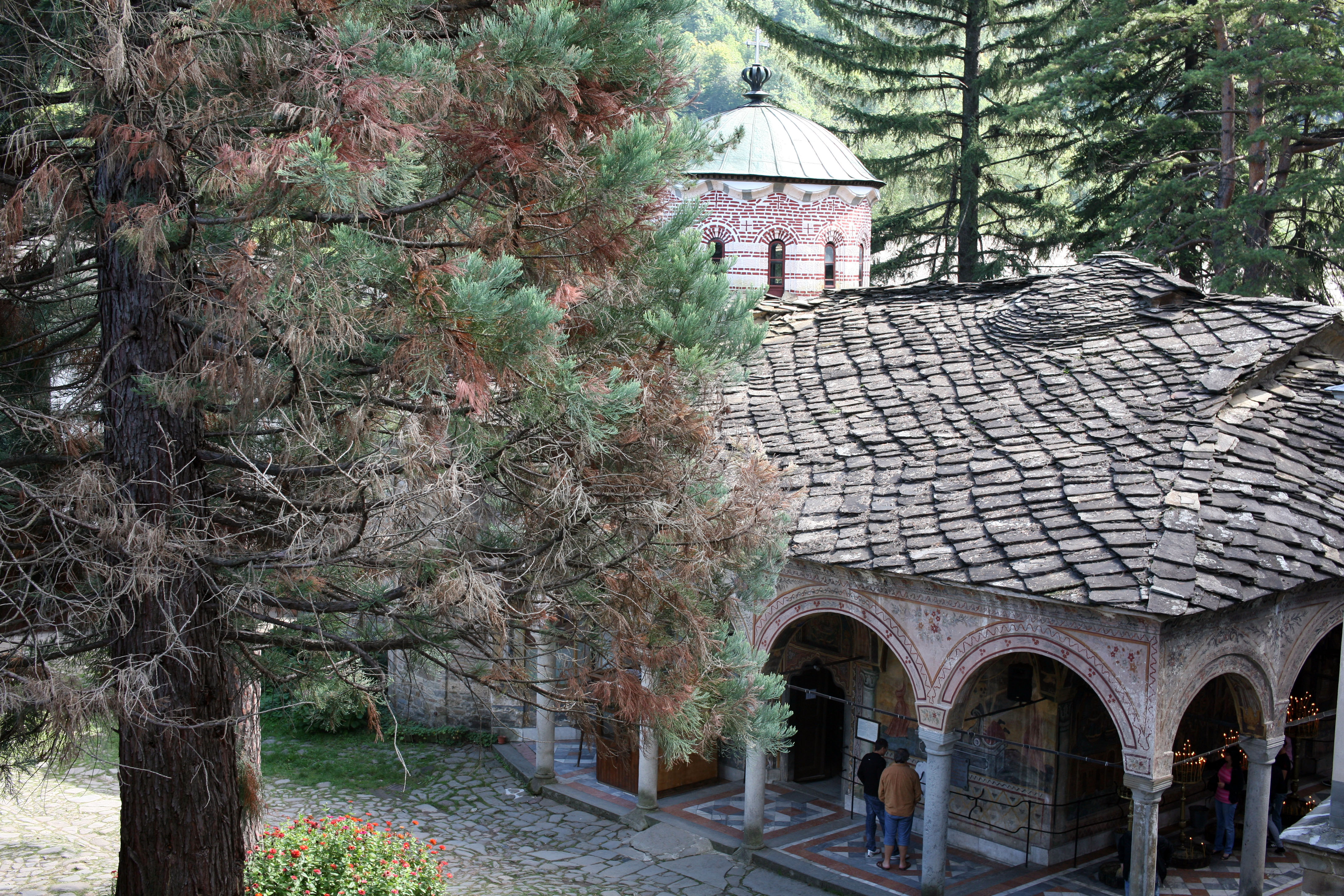
