= Boyan the Mage =

Son of Simeon I of Bulgaria

- Born: 10th-century
- Died: 10th-century
- House: Krum dynasty
- Father: Simeon I
- Mother: Unknown

Veniamin (Bulgarian: Вениамин), better known Boyan the Mage (Bulgarian: Боян Мага), sometimes spelled as Baian, was the fourth and youngest son of the Bulgarian emperor Simeon I (r. 893–927) and his second wife, a daughter of the noble George Sursuvul.

== Biography ==
Almost nothing is known of Boyan's life. He was probably born c. 910. He had a half-brother Mihail from his father's first wife, and two natural brothers, Peter, who succeeded the throne as Peter I (r. 927–969), and Ivan. After the death of his father, his uncle George Sursuvul was appointed a regent to the new emperor, and a guardian of Ivan and Boyan.

Although he was baptized with the Christian name Veniamin, he was also known with the traditional Bulgarian name Boyan, dating from the pagan period. Although the Christianization of Bulgaria took place almost half a century before Boyan's birth, there were still fractions within the society that viewed the new religion as a threat for the independence of Bulgaria vis-a-vis the Byzantine Empire. Boyan's paternal uncle Vladimir (r. 889–893), also known with his pre-Christian name Rasate, tried to restore the Bulgarian paganism during his reign but was deposed, paving the way for Boyan's father Simeon to assume the throne. According to the Byzantine historians, Boyan and his brother Ivan "still wore Bulgarian robe". The meaning of the phrase is very obscure and was likely used in contrast to the "Roman/Byzantine" robe worn by the Bulgarian monarch, which can be interpreted that the two princes wore it as a gesture against Peter's policy, who upon his ascension signed a peace treaty, ending the Byzantine–Bulgarian war of 913–927. It is known that a palace conspiracy in 929–930 tried to overthrow Peter and put Ivan on the throne but it was discovered and Ivan was eventually exiled to Constantinople; his half brother Mihail also rebelled in 930 but died shortly after.

Thus, Boyan was the only brother that had abstained from political intrigue. The only other information about Boyan comes from the account of the mission of Liutprand of Cremona to the Byzantine court in 968: "it is said that Boyan was such an adept in the art of magic that he could suddenly turn himself before men's eyes into a wolf or any other beast you pleased", thus describing the Bulgarian prince as a magician capable of becoming a varkolak, the Bulgarian form of a werewolf. Historian Steven Runciman states that many of Boyan's fellow Bulgarians "took too great an interest in fortune-telling and in demon powers but few could hope to acquire a proficiency such as his". Runciman points to the works of the 10th century Bulgarian writer Cosmas the Priest, who lamented the prevalent taste for fortune-telling in the Bulgarian Empire.

== Boyan the Mage in literature ==
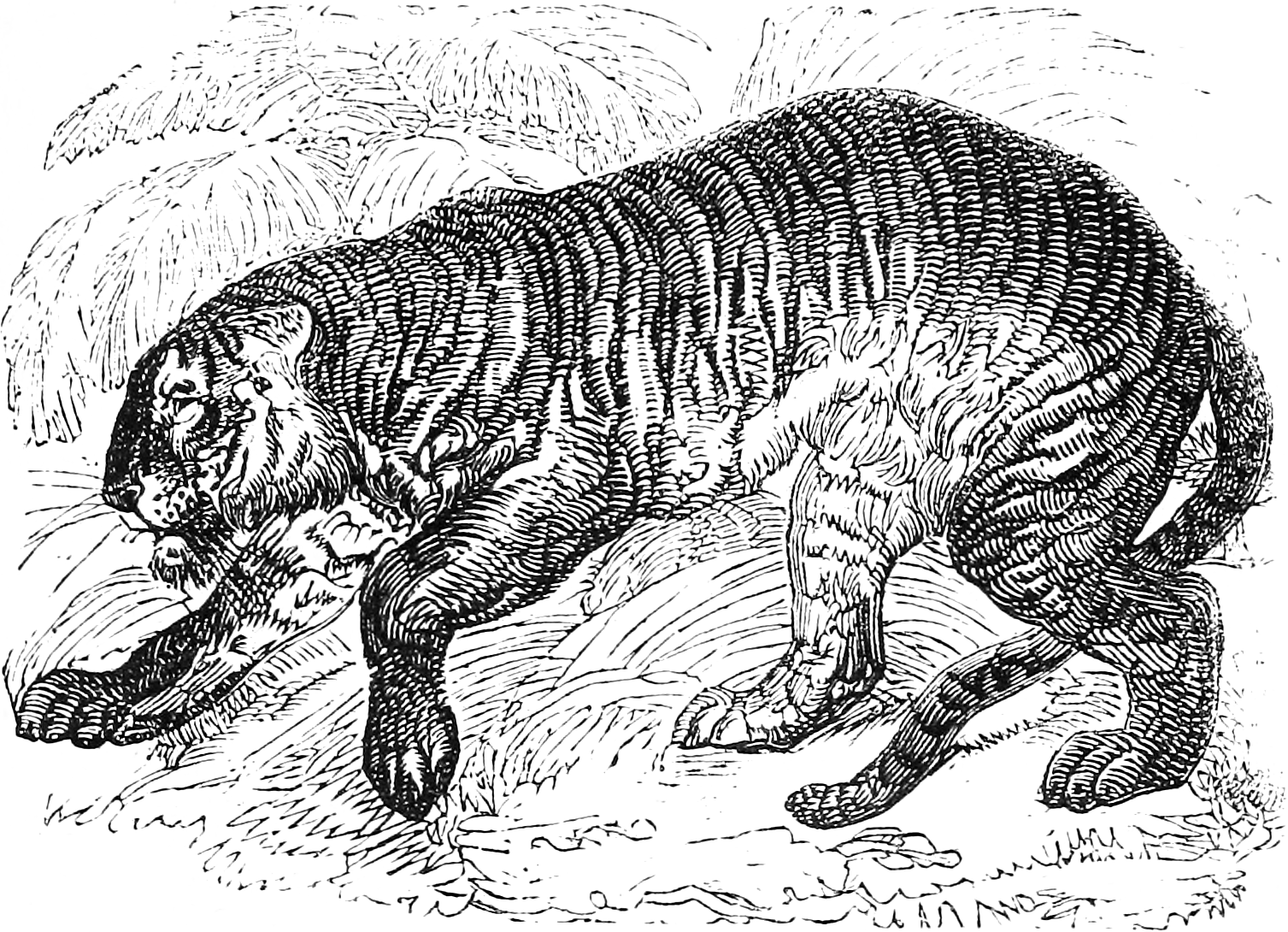
An illustration of Boyan the Mage as a tiger from Jacques Collin de Plancy's Dictionnaire Infernal

There are numerous legends and literary works dedicated to Boyan the Mage. He was included under the name Baian in the 1818 Dictionnaire Infernal of French occultist Jacques Collin de Plancy, where he was described as "such a great magician that he transformed himself into a wolf and a leopard to terrify his people, that he could take on any other form of ferocious beast, and even make himself invisible; which is not possible without the help of powerful demons, as Nynauld says in his Lycanthropie".

He was featured as an army commander in a Bulgarian folk song recorded by the 19th century Bulgarian revolutionary Georgi Sava Rakovski. He is presented as an idealized, romantically mystical image of a Bulgarian protector, a creator of Bogomilism and a European enlightener in the works of many Bulgarian authors, novelists and poets, such as Nikolay Rainov, Yuriy Venelin, Dimitar Marinov, Alexander Todorov, Vasil Punder, Georgi Konstantinov, Tsvetan Minkov, Petar Karapetrov, Nayden Sheytanov, Kamen Zidarov, etc. He was also the protagonist of the 1914 drama Boyan the Magician by the playwright Kiril Hristov.

The few surviving sources about his life, mentioning both his Christian and traditional name, his preference to old Bulgarian customs, and his magical abilities have fueled speculations that Boyan had not fully accepted the teachings of Christianity and that he sought ancient knowledge. The chronicles testify that his character was shrouded in legends as early as the Middle Ages. According to the poet Geo Milev, Boyan the Mage is "the strongest mystification of the Bulgarian genius". The 19th century Russian slavist Yuriy Venelin interpreted Boyan as a person interested in literature, poetry, music and science, who could be called a magician in a metaphorical sense.
