= Byzantine–Bulgarian Treaty of 927 =

The Byzantine–Bulgarian Treaty of 927 was peace treaty between Bulgarian Empire and Byzantine Empire of 927 was a significant agreement that concluded a decade-long war between the two empires. It was signed in 927, marking the end of hostilities and ushering in a period of relative peace and stability in the region. The treaty was a testament to the diplomatic efforts of both sides, particularly the Bulgarian Emperor Peter I and the Byzantine Emperor Romanos I Lekapenos.

The treaty had several important provisions. Firstly, it formally recognized the title of "Emperor" (Tsar, and/or Basileus) for the Bulgarian monarch, a significant concession from Byzantine Empire, which had previously only acknowledged the title of "Archon" for Bulgarian rulers. This recognition affirmed Bulgaria's status as an independent and equal power in the region. Secondly, the treaty established the Bulgarian Orthodox Church as an independent Patriarchate, further solidifying Bulgaria's autonomy and cultural identity. This was a major achievement for the Empire, who had long sought religious independence from Constantinople.

In addition to these key provisions, the treaty also included agreements on territorial matters and trade relations. It solidified the borders between the two empires and ensured the continuation of trade along vital routes. The treaty was further strengthened by a marriage alliance between Emperor Peter I and Romanos I's granddaughter, Irene Lekapene, symbolizing the new era of peaceful relations. The peace treaty of 927 was a landmark achievement that had lasting consequences for both Bulgaria and Byzantium, shaping the political and religious landscape of the Balkans for decades to come.

The political, cultural, and spiritual power of the First Bulgarian Empire during the Krum dynasty turned Bulgaria into one of the three superpowers in Europe at that time, alongside the Byzantine Empire and the Carolingian Empire of the Franks, which would later become the Holy Roman Empire.

== Prelude ==
In the first years after his accession to the throne in 893, Simeon successfully defended Bulgaria's commercial interests, acquired territory between the Black Sea and the Strandzha mountains, and imposed an annual tribute on the Byzantine Empire as a result of the Byzantine–Bulgarian war of 894–896. The outcome of the war confirmed Bulgarian domination in the Balkans, but Simeon knew that he needed to consolidate his political, cultural and ideological base in order to fulfil his ultimate goal of claiming an imperial title for himself and eventually assuming the throne in Constantinople. He implemented an ambitious construction programme in Bulgaria's new capital, Preslav, so that the city would rival the splendour of the Byzantine capital. Simeon continued the policy of his father Boris I (r. 852–889) of establishing and disseminating Bulgarian culture, turning the country into the literary and spiritual centre of Slavic Europe. The Preslav and literary schools, founded under Boris I, reached their apogee during the reign of his successor. It was at this time that the Cyrillic alphabet was invented, most likely by the Bulgarian scholar Clement of Ohrid.

The Magyar devastation of the country's north-eastern regions during the War of 894–896 exposed the vulnerability of Bulgaria's borders to foreign intervention under the influence of Byzantine diplomacy. As soon as the peace with Byzantium had been signed, Simeon sought to secure the Bulgarian positions in the western Balkans. After the death of the Serb prince Mutimir (r. 850–891), several members of the ruling dynasty fought over the throne of the Principality of Serbia until Petar Gojniković established himself as a prince in 892. In 897 Simeon agreed to recognize Petar and put him under his protection, resulting in a twenty-year period of peace and stability to the west. However, Petar was not content with his subordinate position and sought ways to achieve independence.

The internal situation of the Byzantine Empire at the beginning of the 10th century was seen by Simeon as a sign of weakness. There was an attempt to murder emperor Leo VI the Wise (r. 886–912) in 903 and a rebellion of the commander of the Eastern army Andronikos Doukas in 905. The situation further deteriorated as the emperor entered into a feud with the Ecumenical Patriarch Nicholas Mystikos over his fourth marriage, to his mistress Zoe Karbonopsina. In 907, Leo VI had the patriarch deposed.

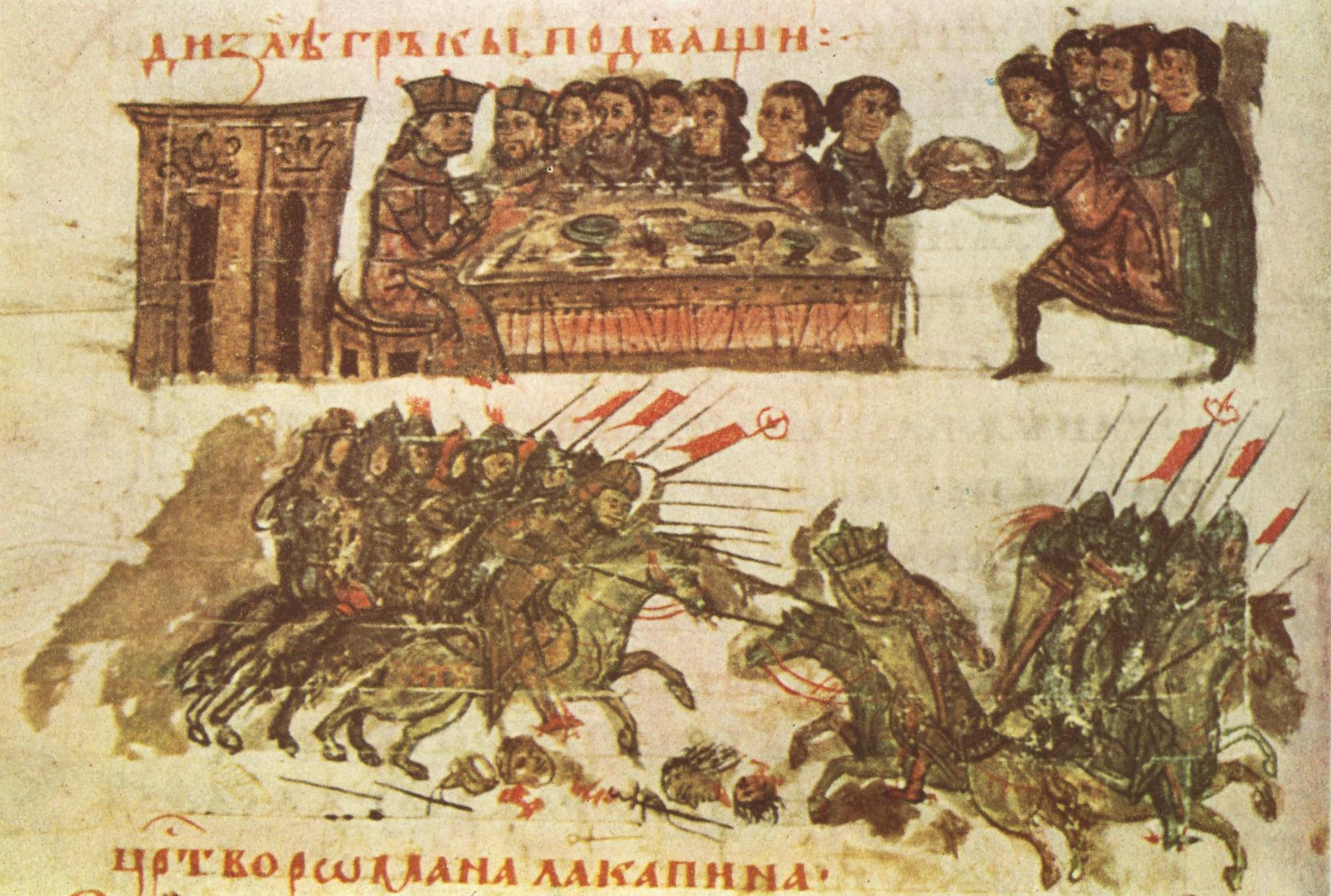
Above: a feast in Constantinople in honour of Simeon; below: a Bulgarian attack upon the Byzantines, Manasses Chronicle.

In 912 Leo VI died and was succeeded by his brother Alexander, who set about reversing many of Leo VI's policies and reinstated Nicholas Mystikos as patriarch. As the diplomatic protocol of the time prescribed, Simeon sent emissaries to confirm the peace in late 912 or early 913. According to the Byzantine chronicler Theophanes Continuatus, Simeon informed him that "he would honour the peace if he was to be treated with kindness and respect, as it was under emperor Leo. However, Alexander, overwhelmed by madness and folly, ignominiously dismissed the envoys, made threats to Simeon and thought he would intimidate him. The peace was broken and Simeon decided to raise arms against the Christians [the Byzantines]." The Bulgarian ruler, who was seeking a casus belli to claim the imperial title, took the opportunity to wage war. Unlike his predecessors, Simeon's ultimate ambition was to assume the throne of Constantinople as a Roman emperor, creating a joint Bulgarian–Roman state. The historian John Fine argues that the provocative policy of Alexander did little to influence Simeon's decision, as he had already planned an invasion, having taken into account that on the Byzantine throne sat a man who was unpopular, inexperienced and possibly alcoholic and whose successor, Constantine VII, was a sickly little boy, considered by many to be illegitimate. While Bulgaria was preparing for war, on 6 June 913 Alexander died, leaving Constantinople in chaos with an under-aged emperor under the regency of patriarch Mystikos.

== The Great War ==
Byzantine–Bulgarian war of 913–927
- Part of the Byzantine–Bulgarian wars Bulgarian–Serbian wars
Date	913–927
Location	Balkan Peninsula
Result	Bulgarian victory; Byzantium recognizes the imperial title of the Bulgarian monarchs and the Bulgarian Patriarchate
Territorial changes	Serbia annexed by Bulgaria

Belligerents
Bulgarian Empire	Byzantine Empire; Principality of Serbia

Commanders and leaders
Simeon I the Great; Peter I; George Sursuvul; Theodore Sigritsa; Marmais	Constantine VII; Romanos I Lekapenos; Zoe Karbonopsina; Nicholas Mystikos; Leo Phokas the Elder; Petar Gojniković; Pavle Branović; Zaharija Pribisavljević

Strength
Unknown	Unknown

Casualties and losses
Unknown	Heavy

The Byzantine–Bulgarian war of 913–927 (Bulgarian: Българо–византийска война от 913–927) was fought between the Bulgarian Empire and the Byzantine Empire for more than a decade. Although the war was provoked by the Byzantine emperor Alexander's decision to discontinue paying an annual tribute to Bulgaria, the military and ideological initiative was held by Simeon I of Bulgaria, who demanded to be recognized as Tsar and made it clear that he aimed to conquer not only Constantinople but the rest of the Byzantine Empire, as well.

The first steps of the regency were to attempt to divert Simeon's attack. Nicholas Mystikos sent a letter which, while praising the wisdom of Simeon, accused him of attacking an "orphan child" (i.e., Constantine VII) who had done nothing to insult him, but his efforts were in vain. Toward the end of July 913 the Bulgarian monarch launched a campaign at the head of a large army, and in August he reached Constantinople unopposed. The head of the Byzantine chancery, Theodore Daphnopates, wrote about the campaign fifteen years later: "There was an earthquake, felt even by those who lived beyond the Pillars of Hercules." The Bulgarians besieged the city and constructed ditches from the Golden Horn to the Golden Gate at the Marmara Sea. Since Simeon had studied at the University of Constantinople and was aware that the city was impregnable to a land attack without maritime support, those actions were a demonstration of power, not an attempt to assault the city. Soon, the siege was lifted and kavhan (first minister) Theodore Sigritsa was sent to offer peace. Simeon had two demands – to be crowned Emperor of the Bulgarians and to betroth his daughter to Constantine VII, thus becoming father-in-law and guardian of the infant emperor.

After negotiations between Theodore Sigritsa and the regency, a feast was organised in honour of Simeon's two sons in the Palace of Blachernae presided over personally by Constantine VII. Patriarch Nicholas Mystikos went to the Bulgarian camp to meet the Bulgarian ruler in the midst of his entourage. Simeon prostrated himself before the Patriarch, who instead of an imperial crown placed upon Simeon's head his own patriarchal crown. The Byzantine chronicles, who were hostile to Simeon, had presented the ceremony as a sham, but modern historians, such as John Fine, Mark Whittow and George Ostrogorsky, argue that Simeon was too experienced to be fooled and that he was indeed crowned Emperor of the Bulgarians (in Bulgarian, Tsar). The sources suggest that Nicholas Mystikos also agreed to Simeon's second condition, which could have paved Simeon's route to become co-emperor and eventually emperor of the Romans. Having achieved his goal, Simeon returned to Preslav in triumph, after he and his sons were honoured with many gifts. To mark this achievement, Simeon changed his seals to read "Simeon, peacemaking emperor, [may you reign for] many years".

After negotiations between Theodore Sigritsa and the regency, a feast was organised in honour of Simeon's two sons in the Palace of Blachernae presided over personally by Constantine VII. Patriarch Nicholas Mystikos went to the Bulgarian camp to meet the Bulgarian ruler in the midst of his entourage. Simeon prostrated himself before the Patriarch, who instead of an imperial crown placed upon Simeon's head his own patriarchal crown. The Byzantine chronicles, who were hostile to Simeon, had presented the ceremony as a sham, but modern historians, such as John Fine, Mark Whittow and George Ostrogorsky, argue that Simeon was too experienced to be fooled and that he was indeed crowned Emperor of the Bulgarians (in Bulgarian, Tsar). The sources suggest that Nicholas Mystikos also agreed to Simeon's second condition, which could have paved Simeon's route to become co-emperor and eventually emperor of the Romans. Having achieved his goal, Simeon returned to Preslav in triumph, after he and his sons were honoured with many gifts. To mark this achievement, Simeon changed his seals to read "Simeon, peacemaking emperor, [may you reign for] many years".

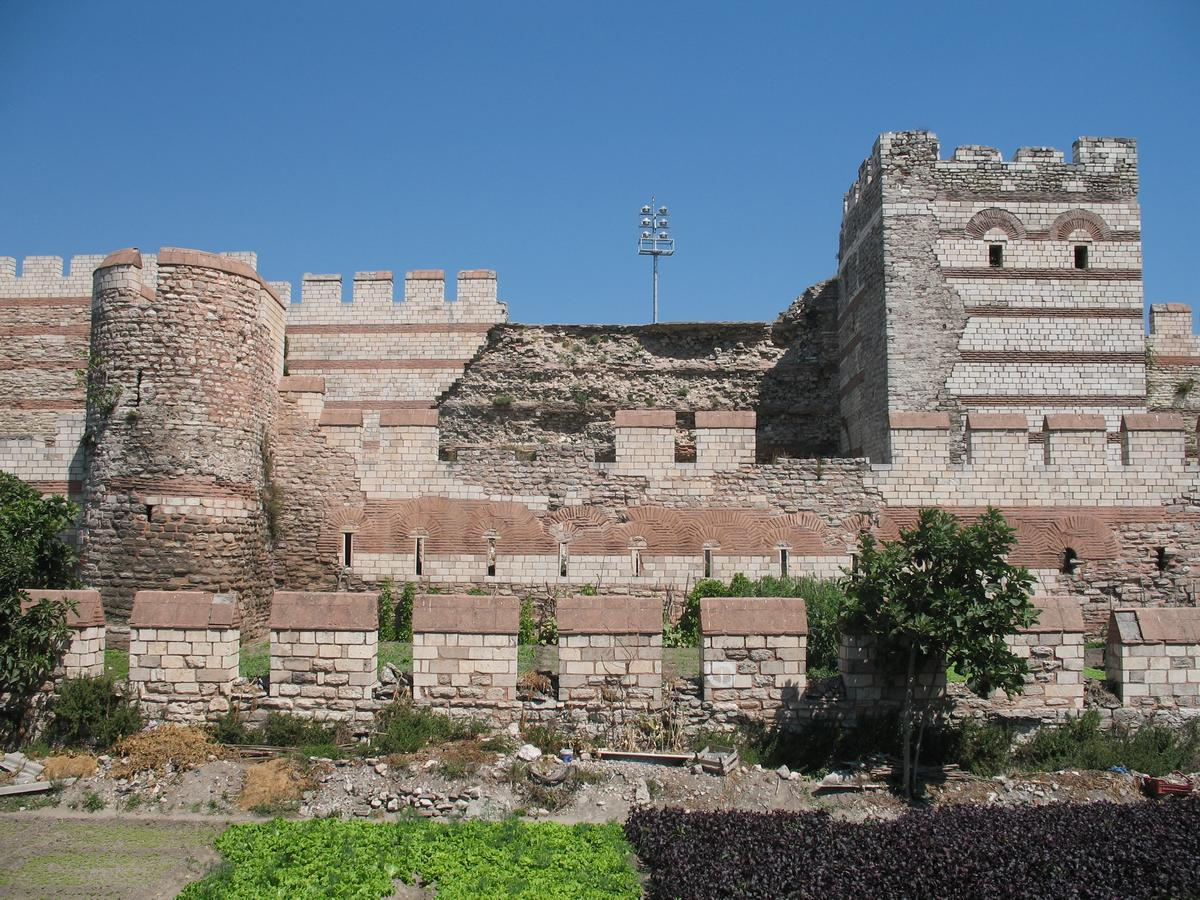
The Walls of Constantinople

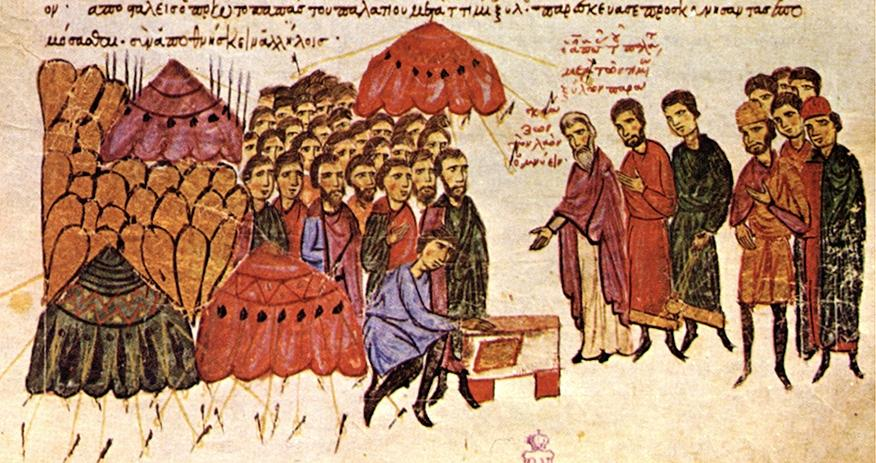
The Byzantine soldiers take an oath on the eve of the battle of Achelous, Madrid Skylitzes.

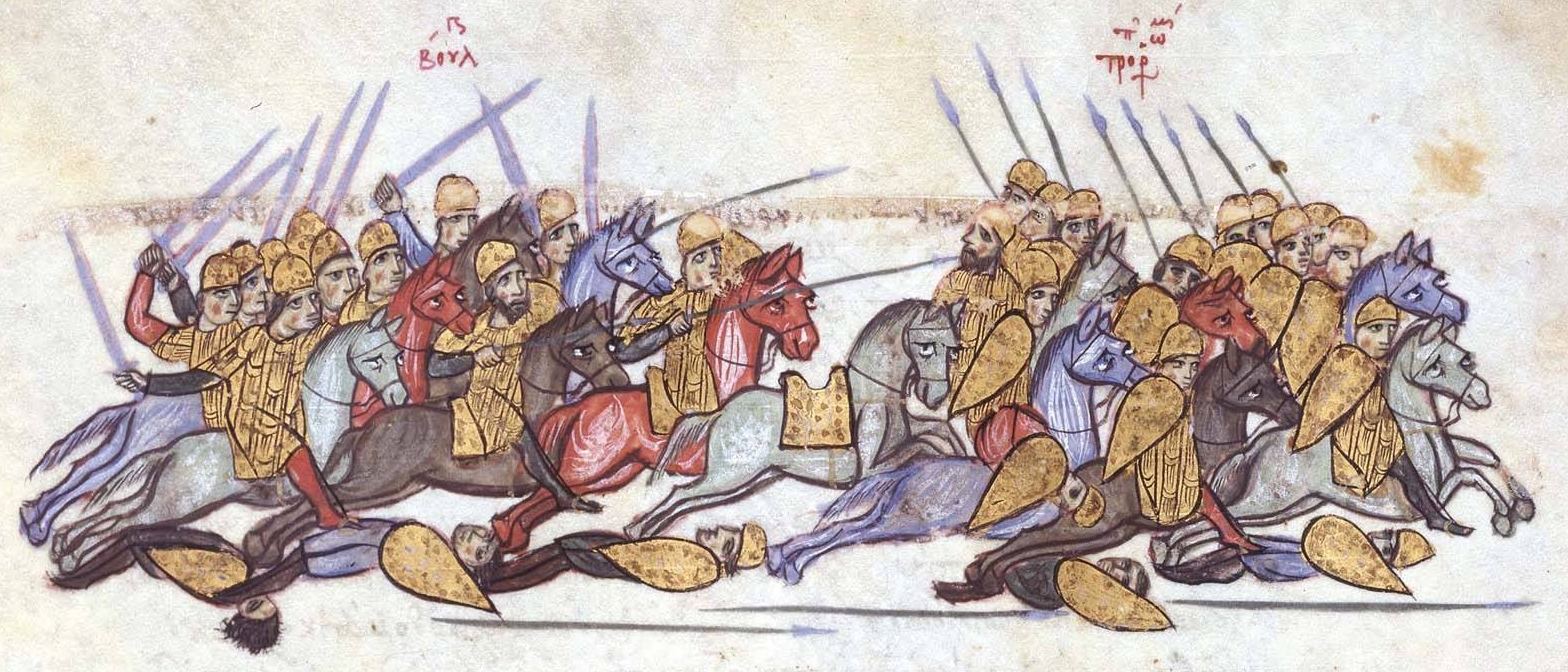
The Bulgarian army defeats the Byzantines at Achelous, Madrid Skylitzes.

The Bulgarian army defeats the Byzantines at Achelous, Madrid Skylitzes.In 917, the Bulgarian army dealt a crushing defeat to the Byzantines at the Battle of Achelous, resulting in Bulgaria's total military supremacy in the Balkans. The Bulgarians again defeated the Byzantines at Katasyrtai in 917, Pegae in 921 and Constantinople in 922. The Bulgarians also captured the important city of Adrianople in Thrace and seized the capital of the Theme of Hellas, Thebes, deep in southern Greece. Following the disaster at Achelous, Byzantine diplomacy incited the Principality of Serbia to attack Bulgaria from the west, but this assault was easily contained. In 924, the Serbs ambushed and defeated a small Bulgarian army on its way to Serbia, provoking a major retaliatory campaign that ended with Bulgaria's annexation of Serbia at the end of that year.

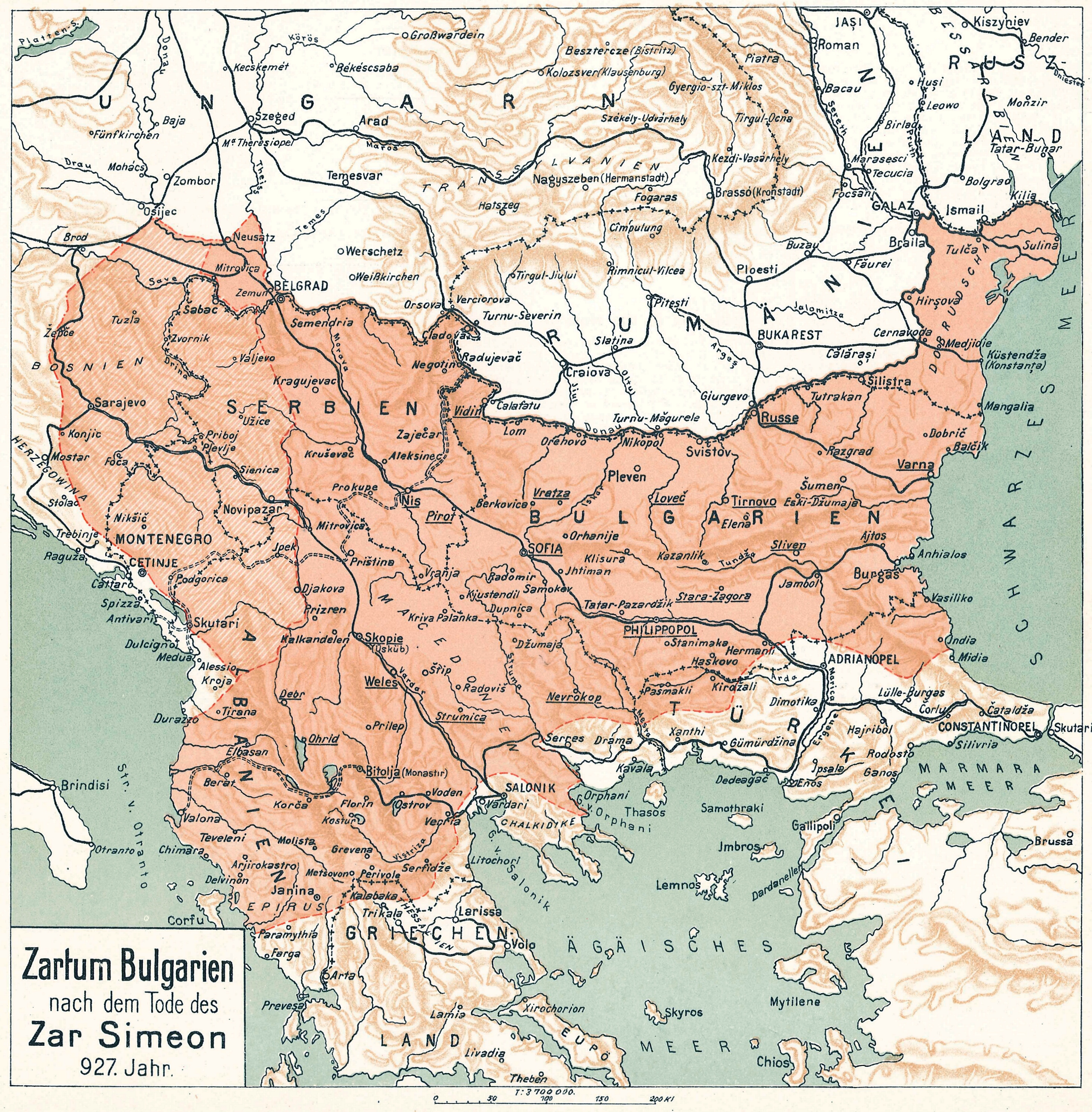
A map of Bulgaria during the rule of Simeon I

Simeon was aware that he needed naval support to conquer Constantinople and in 922 sent envoys to the Fatimid caliph Ubayd Allah al-Mahdi Billah in Mahdia to negotiate the assistance of the powerful Arab navy. The caliph agreed to send his own representatives to Bulgaria to arrange an alliance but his envoys were captured en route by the Byzantines near the Calabrian coast. Emperor Romanos I Lekapenos managed to avert a Bulgarian–Arab alliance by showering the Arabs with generous gifts. By the time of his death in May 927, Simeon controlled almost all Byzantine possessions in the Balkans, but Constantinople remained out of his reach.

== Making a deep peace ==
After the death of Emperor Simeon I the Great, the Bulgarian imperial throne was inherited by his second son, Peter I of Bulgaria (r. 927–969). At the beginning of Peter I's reign, the most influential person in the court was his maternal uncle, George Sursuvul, who served at first as a regent of the young monarch. Upon acceding to the throne, Peter I and George Sursuvul launched a campaign in Byzantine Thrace, razing the fortresses in the region that had been held until then by the Bulgarians. The raid was meant as a demonstration of power, and from a position of strength the Bulgarians proposed peace. Both sides sent delegations to Mesembria to discuss the preliminary terms. The negotiations continued in Constantinople until the final provisions were agreed upon. In November 927 Peter I himself arrived in the Byzantine capital and was received personally by Romanos I. In the Palace of Blachernae the two sides signed a peace treaty, sealed by a marriage between the Bulgarian monarch and the granddaughter of Romanos I, Maria Lekapene. On that occasion Maria was renamed Irene, meaning "peace". On 8 October 927 Peter I and Irene married in a solemn ceremony in the Church of St. Mary of the Spring – the same church that Simeon I had destroyed a few years earlier and that had been rebuilt.

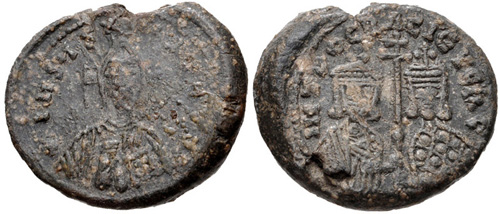
A seal of Emperor Peter I and Empress Irene

By the terms of the treaty, the Byzantines officially recognized the imperial title of the Bulgarian monarchs but insisted on the formula that the emperor of the Bulgarians be considered a "spiritual son" of the Byzantine emperor. Despite the wording, the title of the Bulgarian rulers equalled that of their Byzantine counterparts. The Bulgarian Orthodox Church was also recognized as an independent Patriarchate, thus becoming the fifth autocephalous Eastern Orthodox Church after the patriarchates of Constantinople, Alexandria, Antioch and Jerusalem, and the first national Orthodox Church. The treaty further stipulated an exchange of prisoners and an annual tribute to be paid by the Byzantines to the Bulgarian Empire. The treaty restored the border approximately along the lines agreed in 904 – the Bulgarians returned most of Simeon I's conquests in Thrace, Thessaly and Hellas and retained firm control over most of Macedonia and the larger part of Epirus. Thus, Peter I succeeded in obtaining all of his father's goals, except for Constantinople.

== Consequence ==
During the first years of his reign, Peter I faced revolts by two of his three brothers, John in 928 and Michael in 930, but both were quelled. During most of his subsequent rule until 965, Peter I presided over a Golden Age of the Bulgarian state in a period of political consolidation, economic expansion and cultural activity. A treatise of the contemporary Bulgarian priest and writer Cosmas the Priest describes a wealthy, book-owning and monastery-building Bulgarian elite, and the preserved material evidence from Preslav, Kostur and other locations suggests a wealthy and settled picture of 10th-century Bulgaria. The influence of the landed nobility and the higher clergy increased significantly at the expense of the personal privileges of the peasantry, causing friction in the society. Cosmas the Priest accused the Bulgarian abbots and bishops of greed, gluttony and neglect towards their flock. In that setting during the reign of Peter I arose Bogomilism – a dualistic heretic sect that in the subsequent decades and centuries spread to the Byzantine Empire, northern Italy and southern France (cf. Cathars). The strategic position of the Bulgarian Empire remained difficult. The country was ringed by aggressive neighbours – the Magyars to the north-west, the Pechenegs and the growing power of Kievan Rus' to the north-east, and the Byzantine Empire to the south, which despite the peace proved to be an unreliable neighbour.

The peace treaty allowed the Byzantine Empire to concentrate its resources on the declining Abbasid Caliphate to the east. Under the talented general John Kourkouas, the Byzantines reversed the course of the Byzantine–Arab wars winning impressive victories over the Muslims. By 944 they had raided the cities of Amida, Dara and Nisibis in the middle Euphrates and besieged Edessa. The remarkable Byzantine successes continued under Nikephoros Phokas, who ruled as emperor between 963 and 969, with the reconquest of Crete in 961 and the recovery of some territories in Asia Minor. The growing Byzantine confidence and power spurred Nikephoros Phokas to refuse the payment of the annual tribute to Bulgaria in 965. This resulted in a Rus' invasion of Bulgaria in 968–971, which led to a temporary collapse of the Bulgarian state and a bitter 50-year Byzantine–Bulgarian war until the conquest of the Bulgarian Empire by the Byzantines in 1018.

== Sources ==
- Андреев (Andreev), Йордан (Jordan); Лалков (Lalkov), Милчо (Milcho) (1996). Българските ханове и царе (The Bulgarian Khans and Tsars) (in Bulgarian). Велико Търново (Veliko Tarnovo): Абагар (Abagar). ISBN 954-427-216-X.
- Andreev, Iordan; Lazarov, Ivan; Pavlov, Plamen (1999). Кой кой е в средновековна България [Who is Who in Medieval Bulgaria] (in Bulgarian). Петър Берон. ISBN 978-954-402-047-7.
- Angelov, Dimitar; Bozhilov, Ivan; Vaklinov, Stancho; Gyuzelev, Vasil; Kuev, Kuyu; Petrov, Petar; Primov, Borislav; Tapkova, Vasilka; Tsankova, Genoveva (1981). История на България. Том II. Първа българска държава [History of Bulgaria. Volume II. First Bulgarian State] (in Bulgarian). et al. Sofia: Bulgarian Academy of Sciences Press.
- Божилов (Bozhilov), Иван (Ivan); Гюзелев (Gyuzelev), Васил (Vasil) (1999). История на средновековна България VII–XIV век (History of Medieval Bulgaria VII–XIV centuries) (in Bulgarian). София (Sofia): Анубис (Anubis). ISBN 954-426-204-0.
- Fine, John V. A. Jr. (1991) [1983]. The Early Medieval Balkans: A Critical Survey from the Sixth to the Late Twelfth Century. Ann Arbor: University of Michigan Press. ISBN 0-472-08149-7.
- Gregory, Timothy E. (2005). A History of Byzantium. Blackwell Publishing. ISBN 0-631-23513-2.
- Koledarov, Petar (1979). Политическа география на средновековната Българска държава, част 1 (681–1018) [Political Geography of the Medieval Bulgarian State, Part I. (681-1018)] (in Bulgarian). Sofia: Bulgarian Academy of Sciences Press.
- Stephenson, Paul (2004). Byzantium's Balkan Frontier. A Political Study of the Northern Balkans, 900–1204. Cambridge University Press. ISBN 0-511-03402-4.
- Whittow, Mark (1996). The Making of Byzantium (600–1025). Los Angeles: University of California Press. ISBN 0-520-20497-2.
- Златарски (Zlatarski), Васил (Vasil) (1972) [1927]. История на българската държава през средните векове. Том I. История на Първото българско царство. (History of the Bulgarian state in the Middle Ages. Volume I. History of the First Bulgarian Empire.) (in Bulgarian) (2 ed.). София (Sofia): Наука и изкуство (Nauka i izkustvo). OCLC 67080314.
