= Leontius of Bulgaria =

Patriarch of Bulgaria from 918 to 927

- Patriarch of Bulgaria
- Church: Bulgarian Orthodox Church
- Installed: c. 918
- Term ended: c. 927
- Predecessor: Gregory Presbyter; John Exarch (?)
- Successor: Demetrius

Personal details
- Denomination: Eastern Orthodox Church

Leontius (Bulgarian: Леонтий) was the first Patriarch of the Bulgarian Orthodox Church. Very little is known of his life and tenure. He was mentioned as the first Patriarch of Bulgaria in the Book of Boril, written in 1211.

The renowned Bulgarian medievalist Vasil Zlatarski assumes that in the aftermath of the major Bulgarian victory over the Byzantine Empire in the battle of Achelous in 917, the Bulgarian monarch Simeon I (r. 893–927) summoned a church council in 918 in order to raise the autocephalous Bulgarian Archbishopric to a completely independent Patriarchate. After the triumph at Achelous, Simeon I demanded that Byzantines recognize him not only as Emperor of the Bulgarians, which they already did in 913, but also of the Romans. Zlatarski argues that the first act of Simeon I after the battle was to raise the statute of the Bulgarian Orthodox Church, because according to the Byzantine imperial tradition the autocrat must have a patriarch and there could be no empire without a Patriarchate.

At the convocation of all Bulgarian bishops they elected one of their numbers, Leontius, a Patriarch of Bulgaria. Patriarch Leontius then crowned Simeon I "Emperor and Autocrat of all Bulgarians". The results of the council were not recognized by the Byzantines. Zlatarski notes that before 917 and immediately after the battle of Achelous, the Patriarch of Constantinople Nicholas Mystikos did approach the Archbishop of Bulgaria to try to impact Simeon I but since then Mystikos never addressed the head of the Bulgarian church, most likely because he did not recognize his title – another indirect fact in support of this theory.

Historian John Fine deems Zlatarski's theory plausible, arguing that Simeon I was capable of creating his own Patriarchate since he did not hesitate to call himself Emperor of the Romans and to demand that the Byzantine recognize him as such. He believes that the council could have taken place at any time between 914 and 925, but notes that the Bulgarian Patriarchate was not mentioned in pre-927 sources.

With the Byzantine–Bulgarian Treaty of 927, which affirmed the Bulgarian victory in the War of 913–927, the Ecumenical Patriarch of Constantinople eventually recognized Leontius' successor Demetrius as Patriarch of Bulgaria.

== Sources ==
- Андреев (Andreev), Йордан (Jordan); Лалков (Lalkov), Милчо (Milcho) (1996). Българските ханове и царе (The Bulgarian Khans and Tsars) (in Bulgarian). Велико Търново (Veliko Tarnovo): Абагар (Abagar). ISBN 954-427-216-X.
- Fine, J. (1991). The Early Medieval Balkans, A Critical Survey from the Sixth to the Late Twelfth Century. University of Michigan Press. ISBN 0-472-08149-7.
- Златарски (Zlatarski), Васил (Vasil) (1972) [1927]. История на българската държава през средните векове. Том I. История на Първото българско царство. (History of the Bulgarian state in the Middle Ages. Volume I. History of the First Bulgarian Empire.) (in Bulgarian) (2 ed.). София (Sofia): Наука и изкуство (Nauka i izkustvo). OCLC 67080314.

Titles of Chalcedonian Christianity
Preceded by Gregory Presbyter; John Exarch (?) as Archbishop of Bulgaria	Patriarch of Bulgaria c. 918–c. 927	Succeeded by Demetrius
