= Demetrius of Bulgaria =

Patriarch of Bulgaria from 927 to 930

- Patriarch of Bulgaria
- Native name: Димитрїи Блъгарьскъ
- Church: Bulgarian Orthodox Church
- Installed: c. 927
- Term ended: c. 930
- Predecessor: Leontius
- Successor: Sergius

Personal details
- Denomination: Eastern Orthodox Church

Demetrius (Church Slavonic: Димитрїи Блъгарьскъ Bulgarian: Димитрий Български) was the second Patriarch of the Bulgarian Orthodox Church and the first one to have been recognized by the Ecumenical Patriarch of Constantinople as a result of the Byzantine–Bulgarian Treaty of 927, which affirmed the Bulgarian victory in the War of 913–927 against the Byzantine Empire. Demetrius headed the Bulgarian Patriarchate in the first years of the reign of emperor Peter I (r. 927–969).

Demetrius was mentioned as the second Patriarch of Bulgaria in the Book of Boril, written in 1211. It is likely that Demetrius resided in the city of Drastar on the river Danube rather than in the capital of the Bulgarian Empire Preslav. He was succeeded by Sergius.

== Sources ==
- Fine, John V. A. Jr. (1991) [1983]. The Early Medieval Balkans: A Critical Survey from the Sixth to the Late Twelfth Century. Ann Arbor: University of Michigan Press. ISBN 0-472-08149-7.
- Zlatarski, Vasil (1972) [1927]. История на българската държава през средните векове. Том I. История на Първото българско царство [History of the Bulgarian state in the Middle Ages. Volume I. History of the First Bulgarian Empire.] (in Bulgarian) (2 ed.). Sofia: Наука и изкуство. OCLC 67080314.

Titles of Chalcedonian Christianity
Preceded by Leontius of Bulgaria	Patriarch of Bulgaria; 927–c. 930	Succeeded by Sergius
