= Plenimir (prince) =

Bulgarian prince (born between 931 and 944)

- Born: Between 931 and 944; Preslav, Bulgaria
- Dynasty: Krum's
- Father: Peter I
- Mother: Irene Lekapene
- Occupation: Bulgarian prince

Plenimir (Bulgarian: Пленимир) was a Bulgarian prince (knyaz), the son of emperor (tsar) Peter I (r. 927–969). He was one of three sons of Peter I, all born between 931 and 944. Historiography is well-informed on his two brothers, Boris II and Roman, while scarce information exist on Plenimir. His brothers reigned as Bulgarian tsars Boris II (r. 969–971) and Roman (r. 977–991).

Ancestors of Plenimir (prince)

16. Presian I of Bulgaria
8. Boris I of Bulgaria
4. Simeon I of Bulgaria
9. Maria
2. Peter I of Bulgaria
5. George Sursuvul' sister
1. Plenimir
24. Theophylaktos Abastaktos
12. Romanos I Lekapenos
6. Christopher Lekapenos
13. Theodora
3. Irene Lekapene
7. Augusta Sophia

== Sources ==
- Heisenberg, August (1959). Byzantinische Zeitschrift. Vol. 42. C. H. Beck'sche Verlagsbuchhandlung. pp. 331–332.
