= Patriarch Sergius I =

Patriarch Sergius I may refer to:

- Sergius of Tella, Syriac Orthodox Patriarch of Antioch in 544–546
- Sergius I of Constantinople, Ecumenical Patriarch in 610–638
- Sergius of Bulgaria, Patriarch of Bulgaria c. 931 – c. 940
- Patriarch Sergius of Moscow and All Russia, ruled in 1943–1944
