= Patriarch Demetrius I =

Patriarch Demetrius I or Patriarch Demetrios I may refer to:

- Patriarch Demetrius I of Alexandria, ruled in 189–232
- Demetrius of Bulgaria, Patriarch of Bulgaria in 927–c. 930
- Demetrius I Qadi, Patriarch of the Melkite Greek Catholic Church in 1919–25
- Patriarch Dimitrije, Serbian Patriarch in 1920–1930
- Demetrios I of Constantinople, Ecumenical Patriarch in 1972–1991
