= John the Exarch =

Bulgarian scholar

- Їѡаннъ Єѯархъ
- Born: 9th century Bulgarian Empire
- Died: 10th century Bulgarian Empire
- Occupations: Cleric, writer, translator
- Writing career
- Notable work: Hexameron

John the Exarch (also transcribed Joan Ekzarh; Church Slavonic: Їѡаннъ Єѯархъ Bulgarian: Йоан Екзарх) was a medieval Bulgarian scholar, writer and translator, one of the most important men of letters working at the Preslav Literary School at the end of the 9th and the beginning of the 10th century. He was active during the reign of Boris I (r. 852–889) and his son Simeon I (r. 893–927). His most famous work is the compilation Shestodnev (Шестоднев – Hexameron) that consists of both translations of earlier Byzantine authors and original writings. The Russian Orthodox Church canonized him and his memory is honoured on the 13 August [O.S. 31 July]. In a manuscript of the Gospels, held in the National Library of Serbia, an alternative date is given, namely — 13 February [O.S. 31 January].

== Life ==
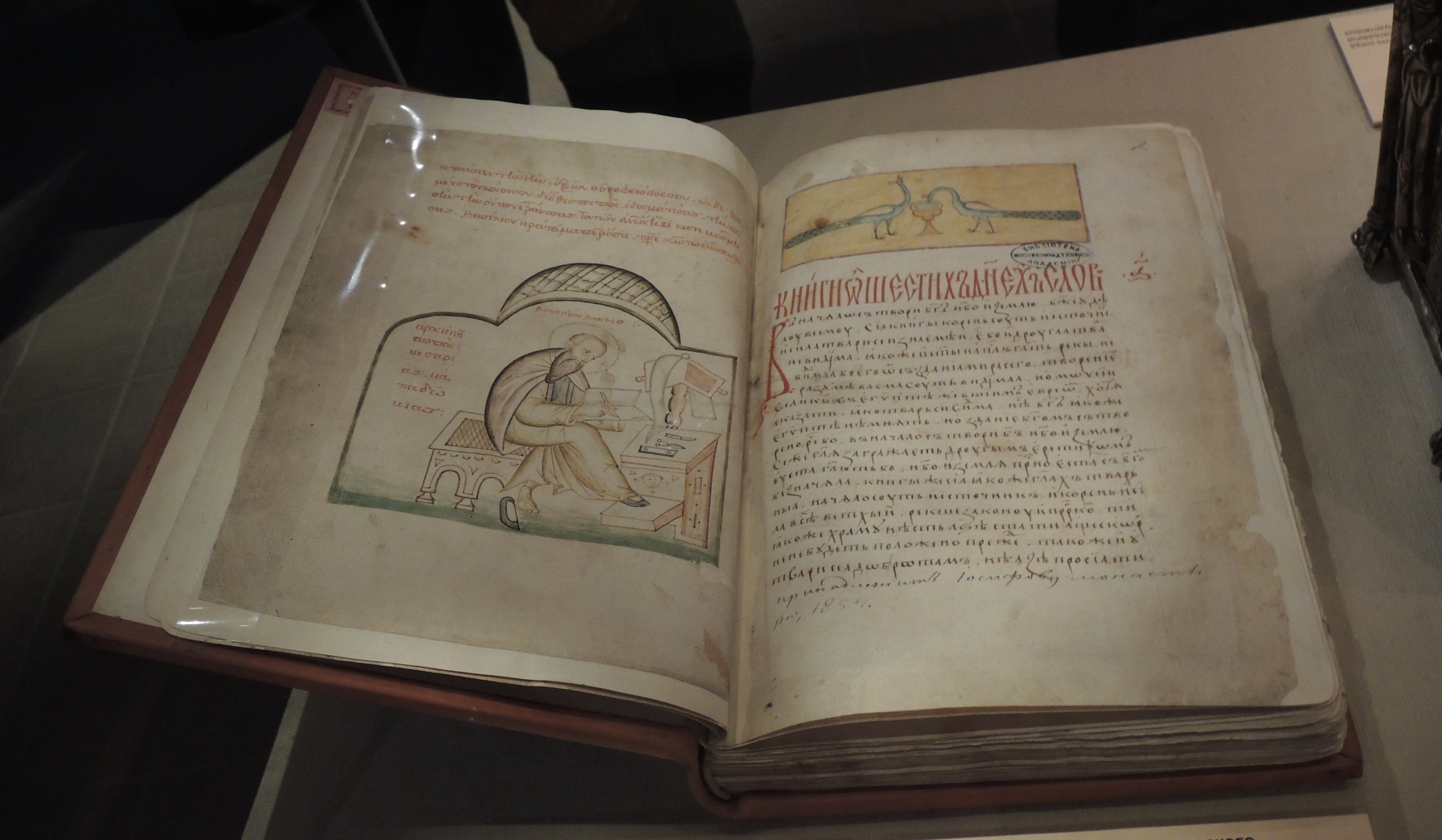
John the Exarch's Hexameron, 15th-century Russian translation

Evidence about his life is scarce but his literary legacy suggests an excellent knowledge of Greek language. It is therefore assumed that John the Exarch received his education in the Byzantine Empire. Some historians assume that his sobriquet "the Exarch" means that he was the Archbishop of Bulgaria. Others suggest that this was not an bishopric rank. There are also theories that identify John the Exarch with Chernorizets Hrabar or with John of Rila.

== Literary activities ==
John the Exarch's literary work includes a number of translations of medieval Byzantine authors, the most important of which is the translation, around 895, of On Orthodox Christianity by the Byzantine theologian John of Damascus. He is also the author of several original works and compilations, the most important whereof is the compilation Шестоднев (Shestodnev). The compilation includes parts of the works of several Byzantine authors, most notably Basil the Great, as well as original parts which give valuable first-hand evidence about the Bulgarian Empire under Simeon I (r. 893–927). John the Exarch describes the royal palace and the Bulgarian ruler that includes information about his attire, the boyars, the social stratification of the Bulgarian society and like matters.

== See also ==
- History of Bulgaria
- Preslav Literary School
- Simeon I of Bulgaria

Titles of Chalcedonian Christianity
| Preceded by Gregory Presbyter | Archbishop of Bulgaria (?) before 917 | Succeeded by Leontius |
