= Krum's dynasty =

Bulgarian royal family

Krum's dynasty Крумова династия
- Parent house: Dulo clan (?)
- Country: First Bulgarian Empire (803–991)
- Founded: 803
- Founder: Krum
- Final ruler: Roman
- Titles: Khan, Knyaz, Tsar
- Dissolution: 997

Krum's dynasty (Bulgarian: Крумова династия) was the royal and later imperial family founded by the Khan of Bulgaria Krum (r. 803–814), producing the monarchs of First Bulgarian Empire between 803 and 991. During this period Bulgaria adopted Christianity, reached its greatest territorial extent and triggered a golden age of culture and literature. Under the patronage of these monarchs Bulgaria became the birthplace of the Cyrillic alphabet; Old Bulgarian became the lingua franca of much of Eastern Europe and it came to be known as Old Church Slavonic. As a result of the victory in the Byzantine–Bulgarian war of 913–927 the Byzantine Empire recognized the imperial title of the Bulgarian rulers and the Bulgarian Orthodox Church as an independent Patriarchate.

The last representative of the dynasty, Tsar Roman (r. 977–991), was succeeded by Tsar Samuel (r. 997–1014) of the Cometopuli dynasty, upon the former's death in Byzantine captivity in 997, after spending six years in prison. Samuel had made the last member of Krum's dynasty a nominal head of state in 977, in order to avoid conflict.

== History ==
Krum was originally a Bulgar chieftain in Pannonia. His background and the events around his accession as Khan of Bulgaria are unknown. It has been speculated that he was a descendant of Khan Kubrat (c. 632–665) and that his rule marked the return of the Dulo clan, the first dynasty of Bulgaria.

== Members ==
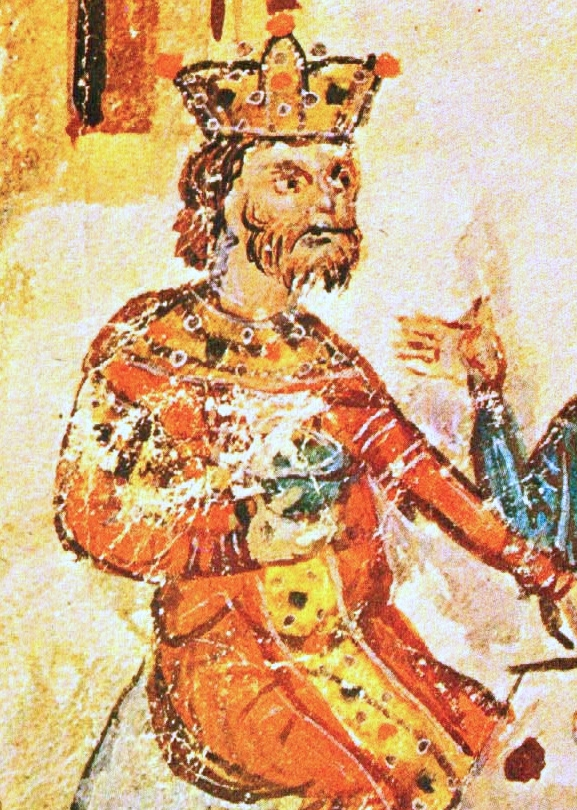
The founder of the dynasty, Khan Krum, 14th-century illustration

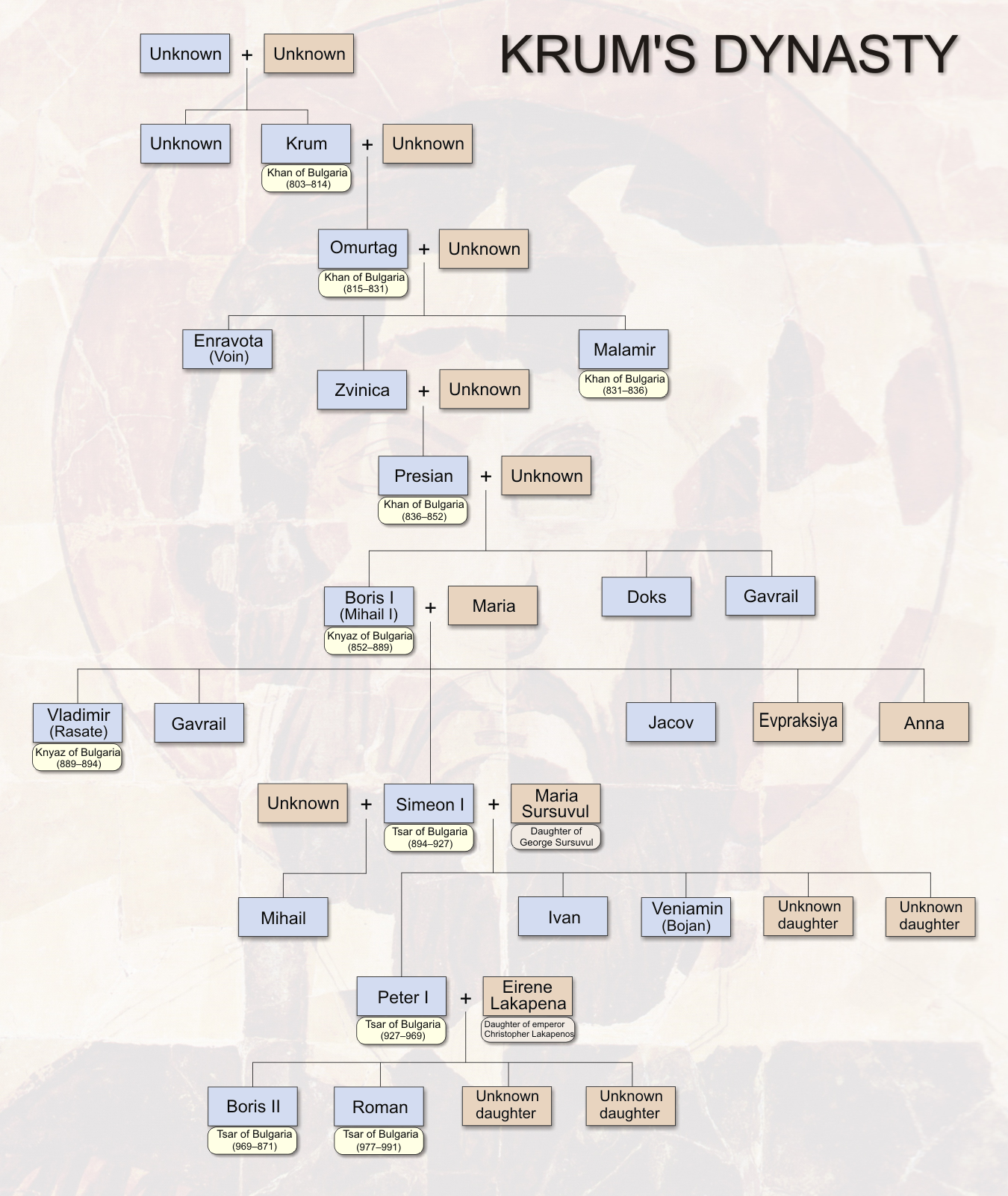
Genealogy of the Krum's dynasty

=== Monarchs ===
- Krum, khan (r. 803–814)
- Omurtag, khan (r. 814–831)
- Malamir, khan (r. 831–836)
- Presian I, khan (r. 836–852)
- Boris I, khan, knyaz (r. 852–889)
- Vladimir-Rasate, knyaz (r. 889–893)
- Simeon I, knyaz, tsar (r. 893–927)
- Peter I, tsar (r. 927–969)
- Boris II, tsar (r. 969–971)
- Roman, tsar (r. 977–991)

=== Family tree ===
- Krum
  - Omurtag
    - Enravota
    - Zvinitsa
      - Presian I
        - Boris I
          - Vladimir
          - Gavrail
          - Simeon I
            - Michael
            - Peter I
              - Boris II
              - Roman
              - Plenimir
            - Ivan
            - Benjamin (also known as Boyan the Mage)
          - Evpraksiya
          - Anna
    - Malamir

== Sources ==
- Fine, John V. A. Jr. (1991) [1983]. The Early Medieval Balkans: A Critical Survey from the Sixth to the Late Twelfth Century. Ann Arbor: University of Michigan Press. ISBN 0-472-08149-7.
