= Sergius of Bulgaria =

Patriarch of Bulgaria from 931 to 940

- Patriarch of Bulgaria
- Church: Bulgarian Orthodox Church
- Installed: c. 931
- Term ended: c. 940
- Successor: Gregory

Personal details
- Denomination: Eastern Orthodox Church

Sergius (Bulgarian: Сергий) was the third Bulgarian Patriarch of the Bulgarian Orthodox Church.
