= Peter I of Bulgaria =

Tsar of Bulgaria from 927 to 969

Peter I Петър І
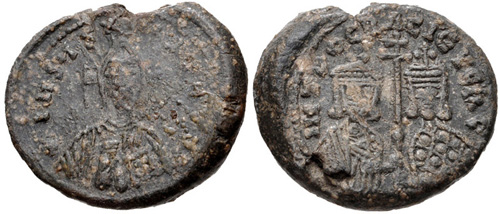
- Seal of Emperor Peter I with Irene Lekapene

Tsar of Bulgaria
- Reign: 927–969
- Predecessor: Simeon I
- Successor: Boris II
- Died: 30 January 970
- Spouse: Irene Lekapene (m. 927)
- Issue: Boris II; Roman
- House: Krum's dynasty
- Father: Simeon I
- Mother: Maria Sursuvul

Peter I (Church Slavonic: Петръ А҃; Bulgarian: Петър I; died 30 January 970) was the emperor (tsar) of Bulgaria from 27 May 927 to 969. Facing Bogomilism and rebellions by his brothers and also by Časlav Klonimirović early on in his reign, Peter secured more success later in life; he ensured the retreat of the invading Rus by inciting Bulgaria's allies, the Pechenegs, to attack Kiev itself. Traditionally seen as a weak ruler who lost land and prestige, recent scholarship challenges this view, emphasizing the empire's affluence and internal peace. Considered a good ruler during the Middle Ages, his name was adopted by later leaders trying to restore Bulgarian independence under Byzantine rule to emphasize legitimacy and continuity.

== Early reign ==
Peter I was the son of Simeon I of Bulgaria by his second marriage to the sister of George Sursuvul. Peter had been born early in the 10th century, but it appears that his maternal uncle was very influential at the beginning of his reign. In 913 Peter may have visited the imperial palace at Constantinople together with his older brother Michael. For unspecified reasons, Simeon had forced Michael to become a monk and had named Peter as his successor.

To prove himself a worthy successor to his father both at home and in the eyes of foreign governments, Peter began his reign with a military offensive into Byzantine Thrace in 927 which was the last campaign of the Byzantine–Bulgarian war of 913–927. Nevertheless, he followed up his quick successes by secretly negotiating a peace treaty before the Byzantine government had a chance to retaliate. The Byzantine Emperor Romanos I Lakapenos eagerly accepted the proposal for peace and arranged for a diplomatic marriage between his granddaughter Maria and the Bulgarian monarch. In October 927 Peter arrived near Constantinople to meet Romanos and signed the peace treaty, marrying Maria on 8 November in the church of the Zoödochos Pege. To signify the new era in Bulgaro-Byzantine relations, the princess was renamed Eirene ("peace"). The extensive Preslav Treasure is thought to represent part of the dowry of the princess. The treaty of 927 actually represents the fruit of Simeon's military successes and diplomatic initiatives, ably continued by his son's government. Peace was obtained with the frontiers restored to those defined in treaties of 897 and 904. The Byzantines recognised the Bulgarian monarch's title of emperor (basileus, tsar) and the autocephalus status of the Bulgarian patriarchate, while the payment of an annual tribute to Bulgaria by the Byzantine Empire was renewed.

== Revolts and incursions ==
The initial successes of Peter's reign were followed by several minor setbacks. Around 930, Peter faced a revolt led by his younger brother Ivan, who was defeated and sent into exile in Byzantium. Soon afterwards Peter's older brother Michael escaped from his monastery and led a more formidable rebellion, which terminated with his early death. The youngest brother, Benjamin (also known Boyan the Mage), was accused of being a werewolf and magician by the Italian Bishop Liutprand of Cremona, but he apparently posed no threat to Peter's authority.

Perhaps taking advantage of these challenges to Peter's rule, the Prince of Serbia Časlav Klonimirović escaped the Bulgarian capital Preslav in 933 and, with tacit Byzantine support, managed to raise a Serbian revolt against Bulgarian rule. The revolt succeeded and Serbia recovered its independence. Peter may have had to also face the incursions of the Magyars, who had been defeated and forced into Pannonia by his father in 896. Perhaps after an initial defeat, Peter came to terms with the enemy and now used Magyar groups as his allies against Serbia. Various Magyar clans and chieftains appear to have begun to settle in what was still Bulgarian territory north of the Danube, where they may have become Bulgarian federates, enjoying independence from the Árpád dynasty. This arrangement paved the way for the eventual loss of the region to the Magyars, although that happened over the half-century following Peter's death. Peter apparently allowed these groups to cross Bulgaria and raid Byzantine territories in Thrace and Macedonia, perhaps as an underhanded reaction against Byzantine support for the Serbian rebellion.

== Domestic rule ==
Peter I presided over a long and relatively peaceful reign, albeit one poorly illuminated by foreign or native sources. In spite of the challenges he encountered soon after his accession and the critical situation at the very end of his life, Peter's Bulgaria appears to have been prosperous and increasingly well organized, with an administrative apparatus noted by foreign travelers and confirmed by the numerous finds of imperial seals. Peter was particularly generous towards the Church, which he endowed lavishly throughout his reign. The emperor's generosity reached such an extent that it was seen as a corrupting factor by even Orthodox clerics, like Cosmas Presbyter. Others chose a path away from the temptations of the secular world, most notably Saint Ivan of Rila, but their ascetic existence still drew the attention of the monarch. Luxury and social tensions may have contributed to the spread of Bogomilism, which Peter duly undertook to combat, soliciting the advice of famous hermits and even his uncle-in-law, Patriarch Theophylact of Constantinople.

== Conflict with Byzantium and Rus ==
Relations with the Byzantine Empire worsened after the death of Peter's wife in the mid-960s. Victorious over the Arabs, Emperor Nikephoros II Phokas refused to pay the annual tribute to Bulgaria in 966, complaining of the Bulgarian alliance with the Magyars, and he undertook a show of force at the Bulgarian border. Dissuaded from a direct attack against Bulgaria, Nikephoros II dispatched a messenger to the Rus prince Sviatoslav Igorevich to arrange a Rus attack against Bulgaria from the north.

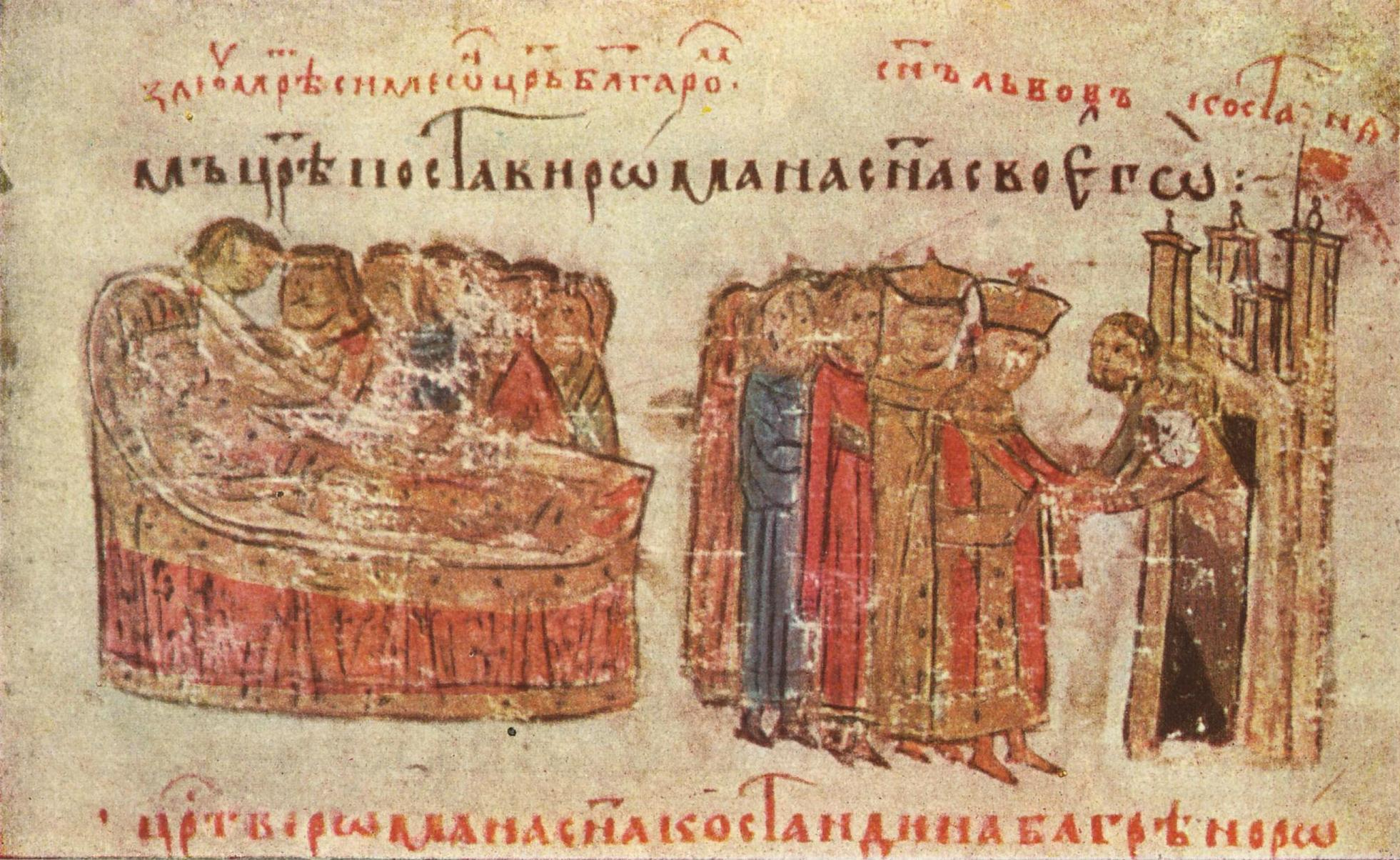
The Death of Emperor Peter I.

Sviatoslav readily launched a campaign with a vast force of 60,000 troops, routed the Bulgarians on the Danube, and defeated them in a battle near Silistra, seizing some 80 Bulgarian fortresses in 968. Stunned by the success of his ally and suspicious of his actual intentions, Emperor Nikephoros II hastened to make peace with Bulgaria and arranged the marriage of his wards, the underage emperors Basil II and Constantine VIII, to two Bulgarian princesses. Two of Peter's sons were sent to Constantinople as both negotiators and honorary hostages. In the meantime Peter managed to secure the retreat of the Rus forces by inciting Bulgaria's traditional allies, the Pechenegs, to attack Kiev itself.

In spite of this temporary success and the reconciliation with Byzantium, Bulgaria faced a new invasion by Sviatoslav in 969. The Bulgarians were defeated again, and Peter suffered a stroke, which led him to abdicate and become a monk. He died on 30 January 970.

== Reputation ==
Compared with the military success of his father's reign, Peter has been traditionally considered a weak ruler, who lost lands and prestige, allowed his military forces to decline while his country was ravaged by foreign invaders, and turned Bulgaria into a Byzantine satellite governed by Byzantine agents in the persons of his empress and her retinue. This view has been questioned by more recent scholarship, which emphasizes the affluence and internal peace enjoyed by Bulgarian society during his long reign, re-evaluates the relationship between Bulgaria and its semi-nomadic neighbors (Magyars and Pechenegs), and questions the allegedly sinister role of Romanos' granddaughter and her retinue. While Peter's reign witnessed the spread of Bogomilism, its origins were more demographic (perhaps inspired by Paulicians settled earlier by Byzantine emperors in Thrace) than social, and the Bulgarian Orthodox Church canonized him as a saint. Peter was considered a good ruler in the Middle Ages, and when Bulgaria fell under Byzantine rule (1018–1185), later leaders that attempted to restore Bulgarian independence adopted his name to emphasize legitimacy and continuity (Peter Delyan, Constantine Bodin and Theodore-Peter adopted the royal name of Peter in their attempts to regain the throne from the Byzantines).

== Family ==
By his marriage to Maria Lakapena (renamed Eirene), Peter I had several children, including:

- Plenimir
- Boris II, who succeeded as emperor of Bulgaria in 969
- Roman, who succeeded as emperor of Bulgaria in 977

== Notes ==
Regnal titles
Preceded by Simeon I	Emperor of Bulgaria; 927–969	Succeeded by Boris II
