= Simeon I of Bulgaria =

First Emperor of the Bulgars from 893 to 927

Simeon the Great
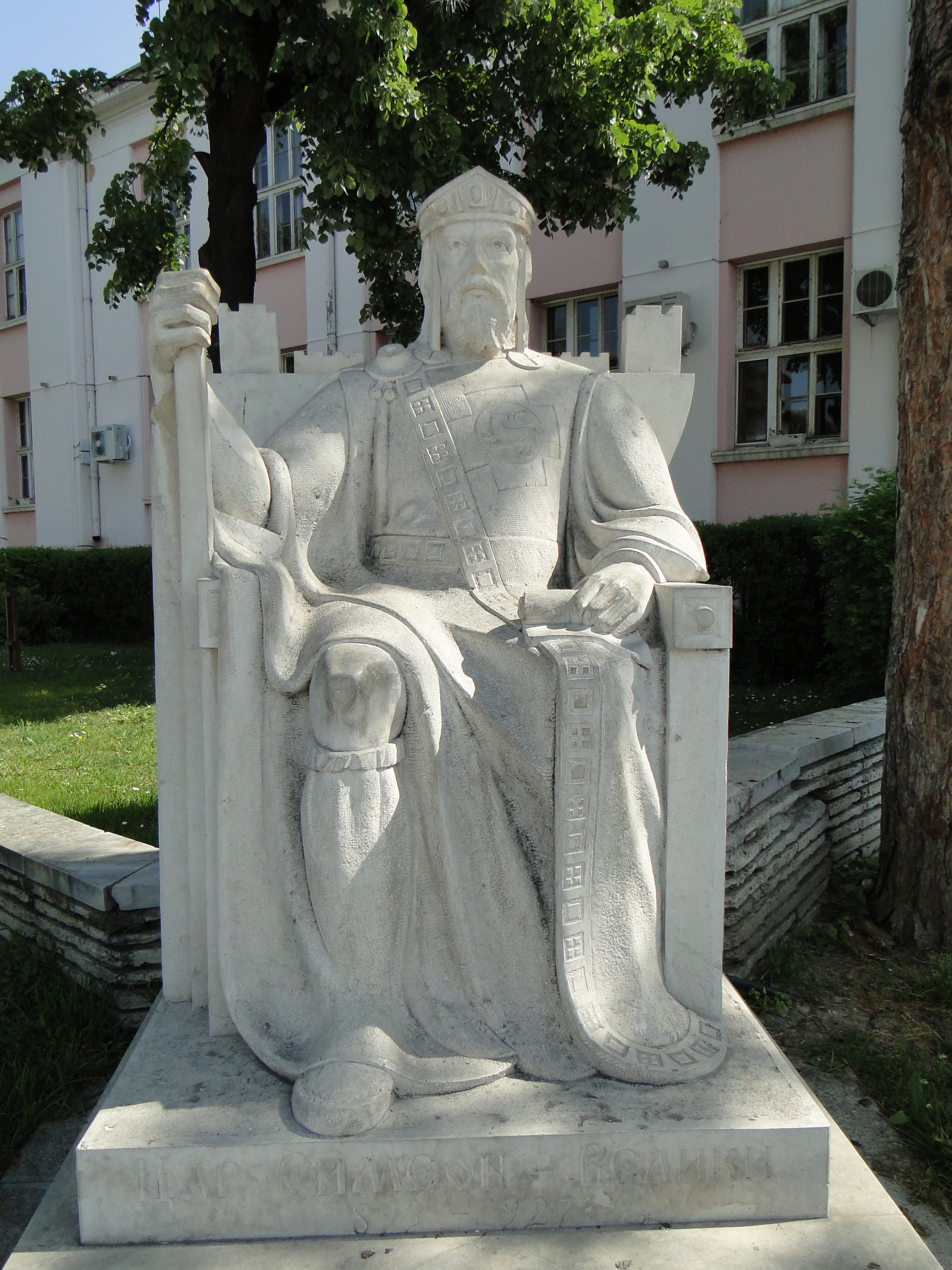
- Statue of Simeon I in Vidin

Tsar of Bulgaria
- Reign: 893 – 27 May 927
- Predecessor: Vladimir
- Successor: Peter I

Emperor of Bulgaria
- Reign: 893-927
- Successor: Peter I of Bulgaria
- Born: 864/865
- Died: 27 May 927 (aged 62 or 63); Preslav, Bulgarian Empire
- Spouses: Unknown name (first spouse); Maria Sursuvul
- Issue: Michael; Peter, Emperor of Bulgaria; Ivan; Benjamin
- Dynasty: Krum's dynasty
- Father: Boris I
- Mother: Maria

Simeon I the Great (Church Slavonic: цѣсар҄ь Сѷмеѡ́нъ А҃ Вели́къ; Bulgarian: цар Симеон I Велики, romanized: Simeon I Veliki [simɛˈɔn ˈpɤrvi vɛˈliki]; Greek: Συμεών Αʹ ὁ Μέγας, romanized: Sumeṓn prôtos ho Mégas) was the ruler of the First Bulgarian Empire from 893 until his death in 927. Simeon's successful campaigns against the Byzantines, Magyars and Serbs led Bulgaria to its greatest territorial expansion ever, making it the most powerful state in contemporary Eastern and Southeast Europe. His reign was also a period of unmatched cultural prosperity and enlightenment later deemed the Golden Age of Bulgarian culture.

During Simeon's rule, Bulgaria spread over a territory between the Aegean, the Adriatic and the Black seas. The newly independent Bulgarian Orthodox Church became the first new patriarchate besides the Pentarchy, and Bulgarian Glagolitic and Cyrillic translations of Christian texts spread all over the Slavic world of the time. It was at the Preslav Literary School in the 890s that the Cyrillic alphabet was developed. Halfway through his reign, Simeon assumed the title of "emperor" (Tsar), having prior to that been styled "prince" (Knyaz).

== Background and early life ==
Simeon was born in 864 or 865, as the third son of Knyaz Boris I of Krum's dynasty. As Boris was the ruler who Christianized Bulgaria in 865, Simeon was a Christian all his life. Because his eldest brother Vladimir was designated heir to the Bulgarian throne, Boris intended Simeon to become a high-ranking cleric, possibly Bulgarian archbishop, and sent him to the University of Constantinople to receive theological education when he was thirteen or fourteen. He took the name Simeon as a novice in a monastery in Constantinople. During the decade (ca. 878–888) he spent in the Byzantine capital, he received an excellent education and studied the rhetoric of Demosthenes and Aristotle. He also learned fluent Greek, to the extent that he was referred to as "the half-Greek" in Byzantine chronicles. He is speculated to have been tutored by Patriarch Photios I of Constantinople, but this is not supported by any source.

Around 888, Simeon returned to Bulgaria and settled at the newly established royal monastery of Preslav "at the mouth of the Tiča", where, under the guidance of Naum of Preslav, he engaged in active translation of important religious works from Greek to Medieval Bulgarian (currently referred to as Church Slavonic), aided by other students from Constantinople. Meanwhile, Vladimir had succeeded Boris, who had retreated to a monastery, as ruler of Bulgaria. Vladimir attempted to reintroduce paganism in the empire and possibly signed an anti-Byzantine pact with Arnulf of Carinthia, compelling Boris to re-enter political life. Boris had Vladimir imprisoned and blinded, and then appointed Simeon as the new ruler. This was done at an assembly in Preslav which also proclaimed Bulgarian as the only language of state and church and moved the Bulgarian capital from Pliska to Preslav, to better cement the recent conversion. It is not known why Boris did not place his second son, Gavril, on the throne, but instead preferred Simeon.

== Reign ==
=== Trade war with Byzantium and Magyar invasions ===
With Simeon on the throne, the long-lasting peace with the Byzantine Empire established by his father was about to end. A conflict arose when Byzantine Emperor Leo VI the Wise, allegedly acting under pressure from his mistress Zoe Zaoutzaina and her father Stylianos Zaoutzes, moved the marketplace for Bulgarian goods from Constantinople to Thessaloniki, where the Bulgarian merchants were heavily taxed. The Bulgarians sought protection by Simeon, who in turn complained to Leo. However, the Byzantine emperor ignored his embassy.

Bulgarian Empire during the reign of Simeon I

Unable to effectively respond to the Bulgarian campaign due to the engagement of their forces against the Arabs, the Byzantines convinced the Magyars to attack Bulgaria, promising to transport them across the Danube using the Byzantine navy. Leo VI may have also concluded an agreement with Arnulf to make sure that the Franks did not support Simeon against the Magyars. In addition, the talented commander Nikephoros Phokas was called back from southern Italy to lead a separate army against Bulgaria in 895 with the intention to merely overawe the Bulgarians. Simeon, unaware of the threat from the north, rushed to meet Phokas' forces, but the two armies did not engage in a fight. Instead, the Byzantines offered peace, informing him of both the Byzantine foot and maritime campaign, but intentionally did not notify him of the planned Magyar attack. Simeon did not trust the envoy and, after sending him to prison, ordered the Byzantine navy's route into the Danube closed off with ropes and chains, intending to hold it until he had dealt with Phokas.

Despite the problems they encountered because of the fencing, the Byzantines ultimately managed to ferry the Magyar forces led by Árpád's son Liüntika across the Danube, possibly near modern Galaţi, and assisted them in pillaging the nearby Bulgarian lands. Once notified of the surprise invasion, Simeon headed north to stop the Magyars, leaving some of his troops at the southern border to prevent an attack by Phokas. Simeon's two encounters with the enemy in northern Dobruja resulted in Magyar victories, forcing him to retreat to Drǎstǎr. After pillaging much of Bulgaria and reaching Preslav, the Magyars returned to their lands, but not before Simeon had concluded an armistice with Byzantium towards the summer of 895. A complete peace was delayed, as Leo VI required the release of the Byzantine captives from the trade war.

=== Anti-Magyar campaign and further wars with Byzantium ===
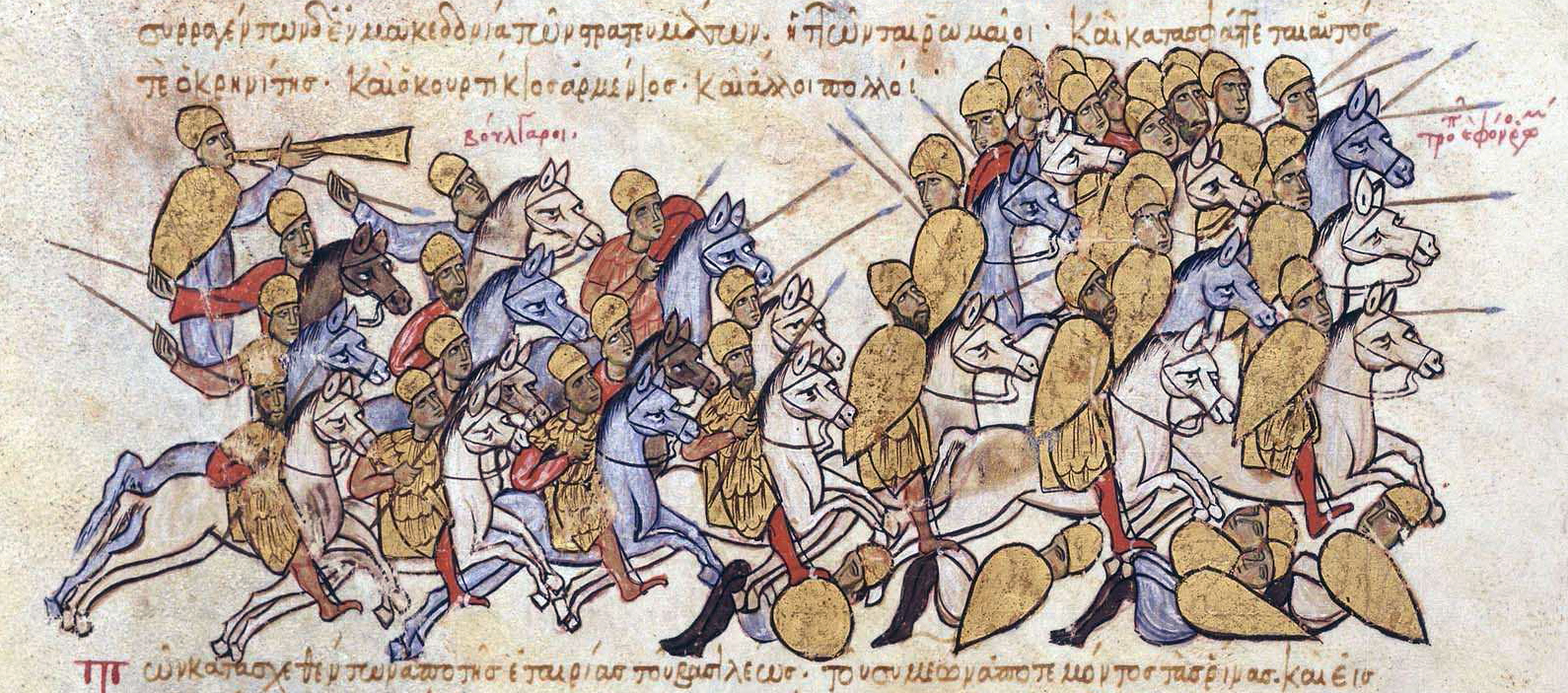
Simeon I's army defeating the Byzantines, led by Procopius Crenites and Curtacius the Armenian in Macedonia. From the Madrid Skylitzes.

Having dealt with the pressure from the Magyars and the Byzantines, Simeon was free to plan a campaign against the Magyars looking for retribution. He negotiated a joint force with the Magyars' eastern neighbours, the Pechenegs, and imprisoned the Byzantine envoy Leo Choirosphaktes in order to delay the release of the captives until after the campaign against the Magyars. This would allow him to renegotiate the peace conditions in his favour. In an exchange of letters with the envoy, Simeon refused to release the captives and ridiculed Leo VI's astrological abilities.

Using a Magyar invasion in the lands of the neighbouring Slavs in 896 as a casus belli, Simeon headed against the Magyars together with his Pecheneg allies, defeating them completely in the Battle of Southern Buh and making them leave Etelköz forever and settle in Pannonia. Following the defeat of the Magyars, Simeon finally released the Byzantine prisoners in exchange for Bulgarians captured in 895.

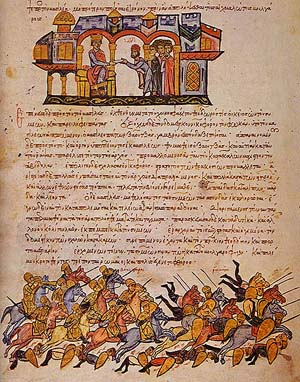
The Bulgarians routing the Byzantine forces at Bulgarophygon in 896. From the Madrid Skylitzes.

Claiming that not all prisoners had been released, Simeon once again invaded Byzantium in the summer of 896, heading directly to Constantinople. He was met in Thrace by a hastily assembled Byzantine army, but annihilated the Byzantine forces in the Battle of Bulgarophygon (at modern Babaeski, Turkey). Arming Arab captives and sending them to fight with the Bulgarians as a desperate measure, Leo VI managed to repel the Bulgarians from Constantinople, which they had besieged. The war ended with a peace treaty which formally lasted until around Leo VI's death in 912 and under which Byzantium was obliged to pay Bulgaria an annual tribute. Under the treaty, the Byzantines also ceded an area between the Black Sea and Strandža to the Bulgarian Empire. Meanwhile, Simeon had also imposed his authority over Serbia in return for recognizing Petar Gojniković as their ruler.

Simeon often violated the peace treaty with Byzantium, attacking and conquering Byzantine territory on several occasions, such as in 904, when the Bulgarian raids were used by Arabs led by the Byzantine renegade Leo of Tripoli to undertake a maritime campaign and seize Thessaloniki. After the Arabs plundered the city, it was an easy target for Bulgaria and the nearby Slavic tribes. In order to dissuade Simeon from capturing the city and populating it with Slavs, Leo VI was forced to make further territorial concessions to the Bulgarians in the modern region of Macedonia. With the treaty of 904, all Slavic-inhabited lands in modern southern Macedonia and southern Albania were ceded to the Bulgarian Empire, with the border line running some 20 kilometres north of Thessaloniki.

=== Recognition as emperor ===
The death of Leo VI on 11 May 912 and the accession of his infant son Constantine VII under the guidance of Leo's brother Alexander, who expelled Leo's wife Zoe from the palace, constituted a great opportunity for Simeon to attempt another campaign against Constantinople, the conquest of which remained the dream of his life. In early 913, Simeon's envoys, who had arrived in Constantinople to renew the peace of 896, were sent away by Alexander, who refused to pay the annual tribute, urging Simeon to prepare for war.

Before Simeon could attack, Alexander died, on 6 June 913, leaving the empire in the hands of a regency council headed by Patriarch Nicholas Mystikos. Many residents of Constantinople did not recognize the young emperor and instead supported the pretender Constantine Doukas, which, exacerbated by revolts in southern Italy and the planned Arab invasion in eastern Anatolia, was all to Simeon's advantage. Nicholas Mystikos tried to discourage Simeon from invading Byzantium in a long series of pleading letters, but the Bulgarian ruler nevertheless attacked in full force in late July or August 913, reaching Constantinople without any serious resistance.

The anarchy in Constantinople had ceased after the murder of the pretender Constantine Doukas, however, and a government had promptly been formed with Patriarch Nicholas at the head. This urged Simeon to raise his siege and enter peace negotiations, to the joy of the Byzantines. The protracted negotiations resulted in the payment of the arrears of Byzantine tribute, the promise that Constantine VII would marry one of Simeon's daughters, and, most importantly, Simeon's official recognition as Emperor of the Bulgarians by Patriarch Nicholas in the Blachernae Palace.

Shortly after Simeon visited Constantinople, Constantine's mother Zoe returned to the palace on the insistence of the young emperor and immediately proceeded to eliminate the regents. Through a plot, she managed to assume power in February 914, practically removing Patriarch Nicholas from the government, disowning and obscuring his recognition of Simeon's imperial title, and rejecting the planned marriage of her son to one of Simeon's daughters. Simeon had to resort to war to achieve his goals. He invaded Thrace in the summer of 914 and captured Adrianople. Zoe was quick to send Simeon numerous presents in order to conciliate him, and she managed to convince him to cede back Adrianople and withdraw his army. In the following years, Simeon's forces were engaged in the northwestern Byzantine provinces, around Drač (Durrës) and Thessaloniki, but did not make a move against Constantinople.

=== Victories at Achelous and Katasyrtai ===
Map of the progress of the Battle of Achelous or Anchialos

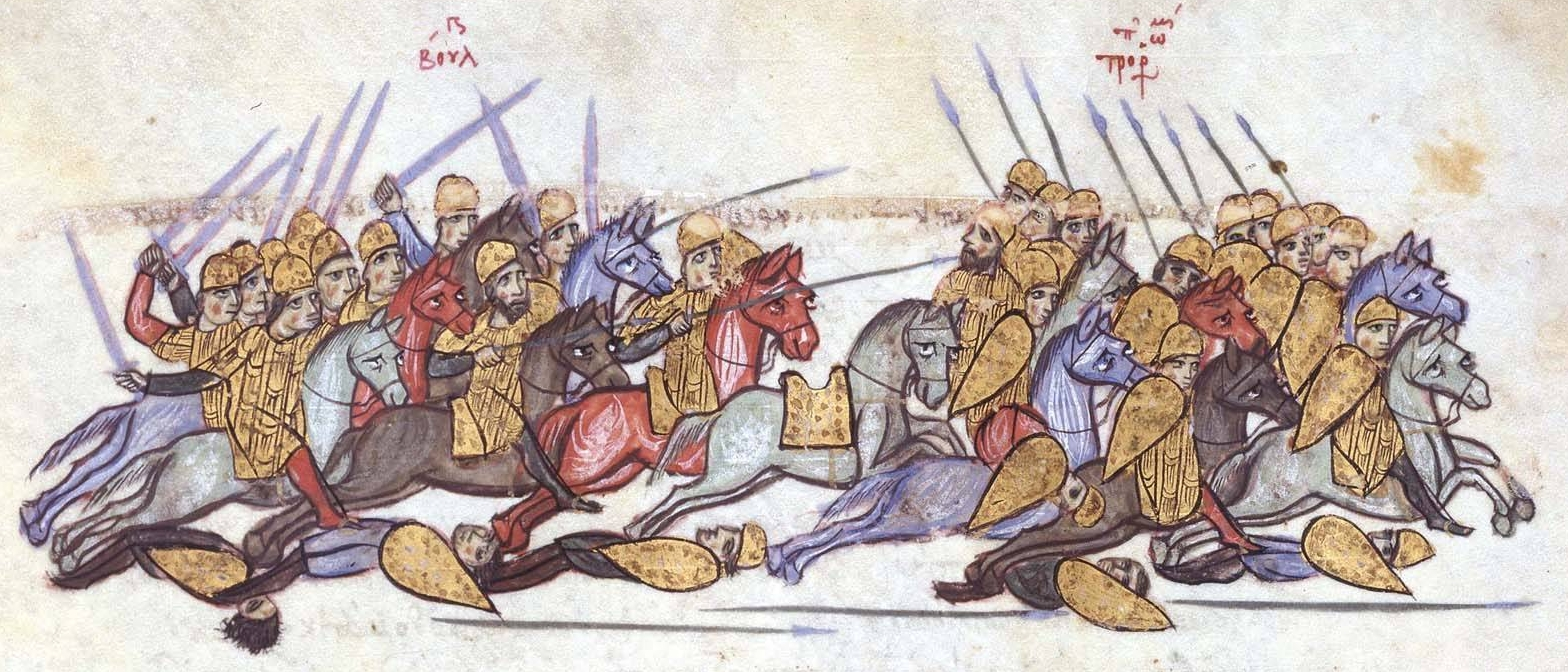
The Bulgarian victory at Anchialos, Madrid Skylitzes

By 917, Simeon was preparing for yet another war against Byzantium. He attempted to conclude an anti-Byzantine union with the Pechenegs, but his envoys could not match the financial resources of the Byzantines, who succeeded in outbidding them. The Byzantines hatched a large-scale campaign against Bulgaria and also tried to persuade the Serbian Prince Petar Gojniković to attack the Bulgarians with Magyar support.

In 917, a particularly strong Byzantine army led by Leo Phokas the Elder, son of Nikephoros Phokas, invaded Bulgaria accompanied by the Byzantine navy under the command of Romanos Lekapenos, which sailed to the Bulgarian Black Sea ports. En route to Mesembria (Nesebǎr), where they were supposed to be reinforced by troops transported by the navy, Phokas' forces stopped to rest near the river of Achelous, not far from the port of Anchialos (Pomorie). Once informed of the invasion, Simeon rushed to intercept the Byzantines, and attacked them from the nearby hills while they were resting disorganized. In the Battle of Achelous of 20 August 917, one of the largest in medieval history, the Bulgarians completely routed the Byzantines and killed many of their commanders, although Phokas managed to escape to Mesembria. Decades later, Leo the Deacon would write that "piles of bones can still be seen today at the river Achelous, where the fleeing army of the Romans was then infamously slain".

The planned Pecheneg attack from the north also failed, as the Pechenegs quarrelled with admiral Lekapenos, who refused to transport them across the Danube to aid the main Byzantine army. The Byzantines were not aided by Serbs and Magyars either: the Magyars were engaged in Western Europe as Frankish allies, and the Serbs under Petar Gojniković were reluctant to attack Bulgaria because Michael of Zahumlje, an ally of Bulgaria, had notified Simeon of their plans.

Simeon's army quickly followed up the victory of Achelous with another success. The Bulgarians sent to pursue the remnants of the Byzantine army approached Constantinople and encountered Byzantine forces under Leo Phokas, who had returned to the capital, at the village of Katasyrtai in the immediate proximity of Constantinople. The Bulgarian regiments attacked and again defeated the Byzantines, destroying some of their last units before returning to Bulgaria.

=== Suppression of Serbian unrest and late campaigns against Byzantium ===
Immediately after that campaign, Simeon sought to punish the Serbian ruler Petar Gojniković who had attempted to betray him by concluding an alliance with the Byzantines. Simeon sent an army led by two of his commanders, Theodore Sigrica and Marmais, to Serbia. The two managed to persuade Petar to attend a personal meeting, during which he was enchained and carried off to Bulgaria, where he died in a dungeon. Simeon put Pavle Branović, prior to that an exile in Bulgaria, on the Serbian throne, thus restoring the Bulgarian influence in Serbia for a while.

Meanwhile, the Byzantine military failures forced another change of government in Constantinople: the admiral Romanos Lekapenos replaced Zoe as regent of the young Constantine VII in 919, forcing her back into a convent. Romanos betrothed his daughter Helena Lekapene to Constantine and advanced to the rank of co-emperor in December 920, effectively assuming the government of the empire, which was largely what Simeon had planned to do.

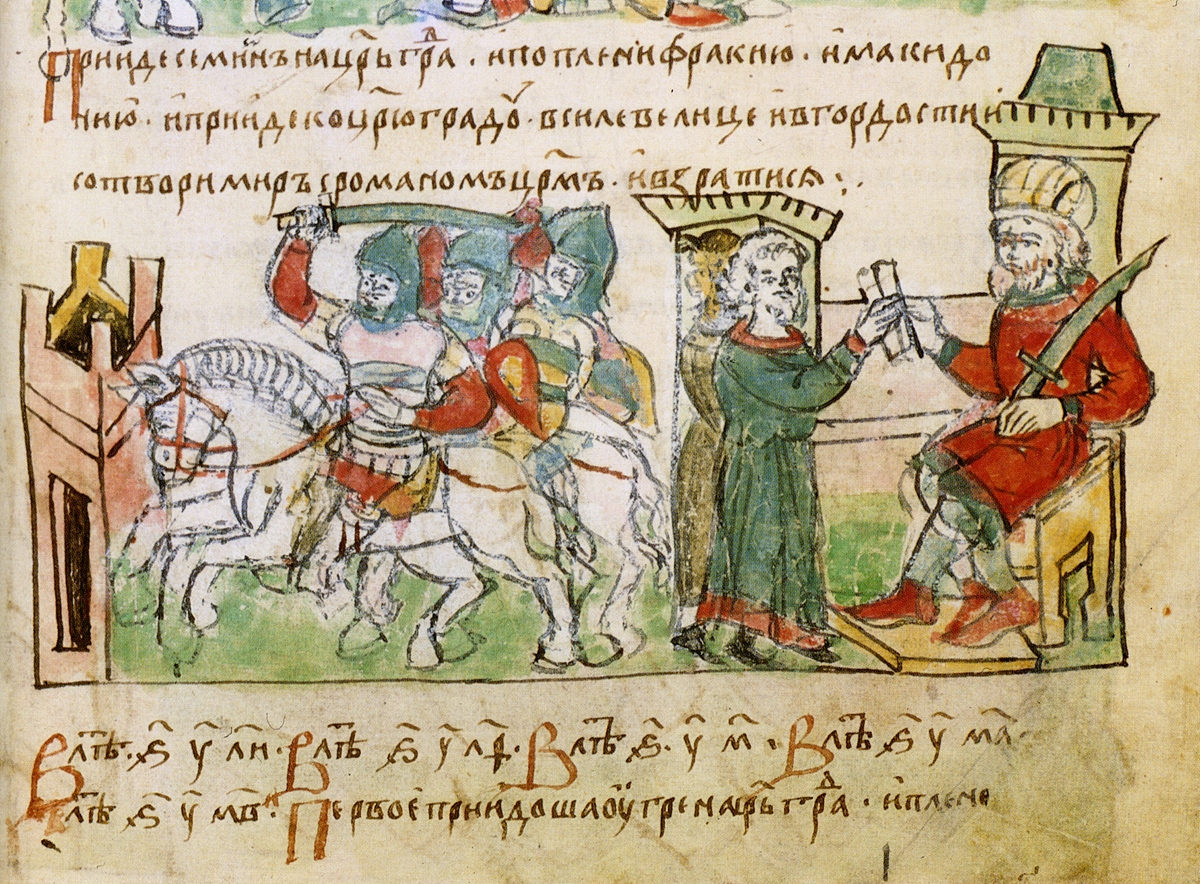
Byzantine Emperor Romanos I Lekapenos negotiating with Simeon I of Bulgaria c. 922–924. miniature of the Radziwill Chronicle (15th century).

No longer able to climb to the Byzantine throne by diplomatic means, the infuriated Simeon once again had to wage war to impose his will. Between 920 and 922, Bulgaria increased its pressure on Byzantium, campaigning in the west through Thessaly reaching the Isthmus of Corinth and in the east in Thrace, reaching and crossing the Dardanelles to lay siege on the town of Lampsacus. Simeon's forces appeared before Constantinople in 921, when they demanded the deposition of Romanos and captured Adrianople, and 922, when they were victorious at Pigae, burned much of the Golden Horn and seized Bizye. In the meantime, the Byzantines attempted to ignite Serbia against Simeon, but he substituted Pavle with Zaharije Pribisavljević, a former refugee at Constantinople that he had captured.

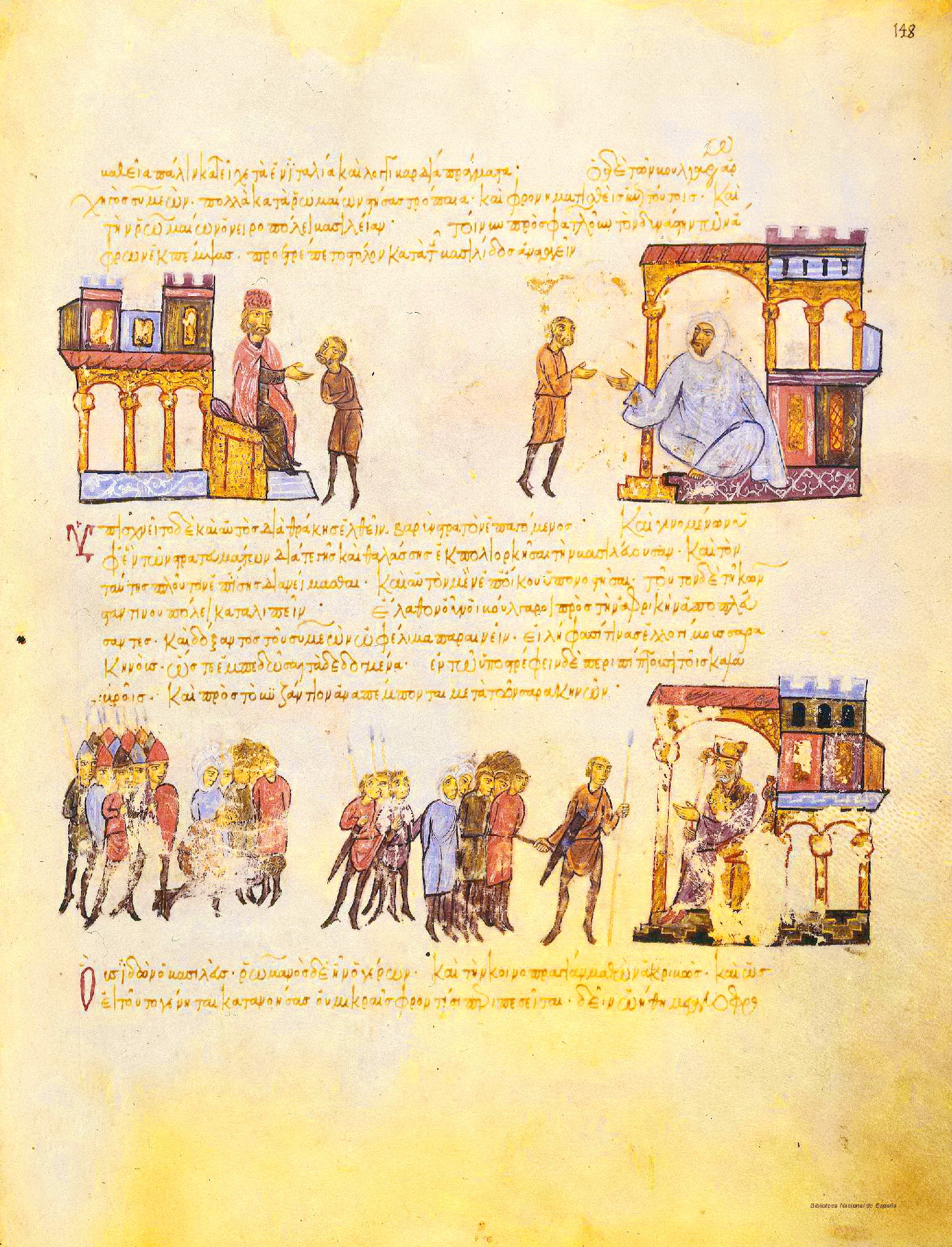
Simeon of Bulgaria striking an alliance with the Fatimids, which Romanos I tries to intercept.

Desperate to conquer Constantinople, Simeon planned a large campaign in 924 and sent envoys to the Fatimid caliph Ubayd Allah al-Mahdi Billah, who possessed a powerful navy which Simeon needed. The caliph agreed and sent his own representatives back with the Bulgarians to arrange the alliance. However, the envoys were captured by the Byzantines at Calabria. Romanos offered peace to the Arabs, supplementing this offer with generous gifts, and ruined their union with Bulgaria.

In Serbia, Zaharije was persuaded by the Byzantines to revolt against Simeon. Zaharije was supported by many Bulgarians exhausted from Simeon's endless campaigns against Byzantium. The Bulgarian emperor sent his troops under Sigrica and Marmais, but they were routed and the two commanders beheaded, which forced Simeon to conclude an armistice with Byzantium in order to concentrate on the suppression of the uprising. Simeon sent an army led by Časlav Klonimirović in 924 to depose Zaharije. He was successful, as Zaharije fled to Croatia. After this victory, the Serbian nobility was invited to come to Bulgaria and bow to the new Prince. However, he did not appear at the supposed meeting and all of them were beheaded. Bulgaria annexed Serbia directly.

In the summer of 924, Simeon nevertheless arrived at Constantinople and demanded to see the patriarch and the emperor. He conversed with Romanos on the Golden Horn on 9 September 924 and arranged a truce, according to which Byzantium would pay Bulgaria an annual tax, but would be ceded back some cities on the Black Sea coast. During the interview of the two monarchs, two eagles are said to have met in the skies above and then to have parted, one of them flying over Constantinople and the other heading to Thrace, as a sign of the irreconcilability of the two rulers. In his description of this meeting, Theophanes Continuatus mentions that "the two emperors... conversed", which may indicate renewed Byzantine recognition of Simeon's imperial claims.

=== War with Croatia and death ===
Most likely after (or possibly at the time of) Patriarch Nicholas' death in 925, Simeon raised the status of the Bulgarian Orthodox Church to a patriarchate. This may be linked to Simeon's diplomatic relations with the Papacy between 924 and 926, during which he demanded and received Pope John X's recognition of his title as "Emperor of the Romans", truly equal to the Byzantine emperor, and possibly the confirmation of a patriarchal dignity for the head of the Bulgarian Orthodox Church.

In 926, Simeon's troops under Alogobotur invaded Croatia, at the time a Byzantine ally, but were completely defeated by the army of King Tomislav in the Battle of the Bosnian Highlands. Fearing a Bulgarian retribution, Tomislav agreed to abandon his union with Byzantium and make peace on the basis of the status quo, negotiated by the papal legate Madalbert. In the last months of his life, Simeon prepared for another conflict with Constantinople despite Romanos' desperate pleas for peace.

On 27 May 927, Simeon died of heart failure in his palace in Preslav. Byzantine chroniclers tie his death to a legend, according to which Romanos decapitated a statue which was Simeon's inanimate double, and he died at that very hour.

He was succeeded by his son Peter I, with George Sursubul, the new emperor's maternal uncle, initially acting as a regent. As part of the peace treaty signed in October 927 and reinforced by Peter's marriage to Maria (Eirene), Romanos' granddaughter, the existing borders were confirmed, as were the Bulgarian ruler's imperial dignity and the head of the Bulgarian Church's patriarchal status.

H.H.Howorth opined "If he had lived, or if he had been succeeded by princes of the same martial character, it is very probable that a great Slav state reaching from the Adriatic to the Black Sea, which would have been a barrier to the Turks, might have been formed south of the Danube."

== Culture and religion ==
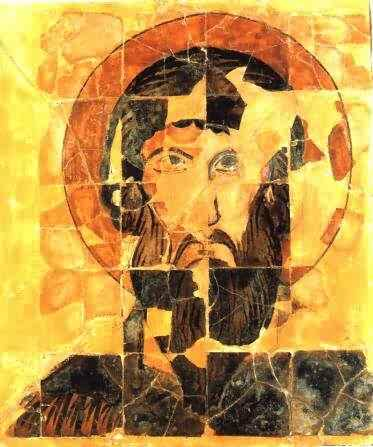
Ceramic icon of Theodore Stratelates dating to Simeon's reign

During Simeon's reign, Bulgaria reached its cultural apogee, becoming the literary and spiritual centre of Slavic Europe. In this respect, Simeon continued his father Boris' policy of establishing and spreading Slavic culture and attracting noted scholars and writers within Bulgaria's borders. It was in the Preslav Literary School and Ohrid Literary School, founded under Boris, that the main literary work in Bulgaria was concentrated during the reign of Simeon in the new Cyrillic alphabet which was developed there.

The late 9th and early 10th centuries constitute the earliest and most productive period of medieval Bulgarian literature. Having spent his early years in Constantinople, Simeon introduced Byzantine culture to the Bulgarian court, but eliminated its assimilative effect by means of military power and religious autonomy. The disciples of Cyril and Methodius, among whom were Clement of Ohrid, Naum and Constantine of Preslav, continued their educational work in Bulgaria, actively translating Christian texts, such as the Bible and the works of John Chrysostom, Basil of Caesarea, Cyril of Alexandria, Gregory of Nazianzus, and Athanasius of Alexandria, as well as historic chronicles such as those of John Malalas and George Hamartolus, to Bulgarian. The reign of Simeon also witnessed the production of a number of original theological and secular works, such as John Exarch's Six Days (Šestodnev), Constantine of Preslav's Alphabetical Prayer and Proclamation of the Holy Gospels, and Černorizec Hrabǎr's An Account of Letters. Simeon's own contribution to this literary blossoming was praised by his contemporaries, for example in the Praise to Tsar Simeon preserved in the Zlatostruj collection and Simeon's Collection, to which the tsar personally wrote an addendum.

Simeon turned the new Bulgarian capital Preslav into a magnificent religious and cultural centre, intended more as a display of his realm's heyday and as a royal residence than as a military fortress. With its more than twenty cross-domed churches and numerous monasteries, its impressive royal palace and the Golden (or Round) Church, Preslav was a true imperial capital. The development of Bulgarian art in the period is demonstrated by a ceramic icon of Theodore Stratelates and the Preslav-style illustrated ceramics.

== Family ==
Simeon was married twice. By his first wife, whose identity is unknown, Simeon had a son called Michael. Possibly because his mother was of inferior birth, he was excluded from the succession and sent to a monastery.

By his second wife, the sister of the influential noble George Sursubul, he had three sons: Peter, who succeeded as Emperor of Bulgaria in 927 and ruled until 969; Ivan, who unsuccessfully conspired against Peter in 929 and then fled to Byzantium; and Benjamin (also known as Bajan or Boyan the Mage), who, according to Lombard historian Liutprand of Cremona, "possessed the power to transform himself suddenly into a wolf or other strange animal".

Simeon also had several daughters, including one who was arranged to marry Constantine VII in 913. The marriage was annulled by Constantine's mother Zoe once she had returned to the court.

Family tree of Simeon I

Boris I (d. 907, ruled 852–889)	Maria
Vladimir (ruled 889–893)	Gabriel (Gavril)	Jacob (Jakov)	Eupraxia (Evpraksija)	Anna
1 unknown wife	Simeon I (b. 864/865, d. 927, ruled 893–927)	2 sister of George Sursubul
1	2	2	2	?
Michael (d. 931)	Peter I (b. after 912, d. 970, ruled 927–969)	Ivan	Benjamin	daughters

== Legacy and popular culture ==
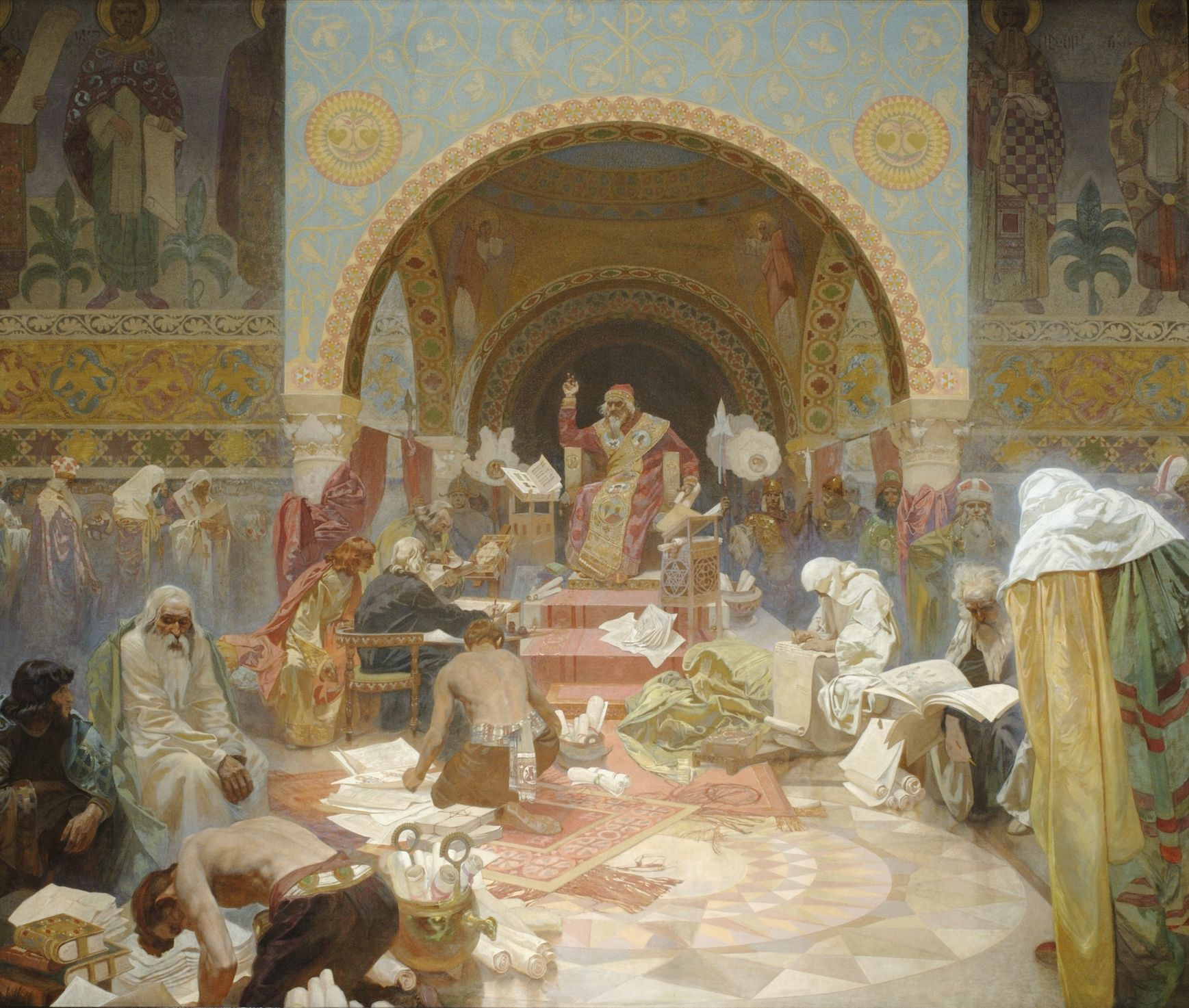
The Bulgarian Tsar Simeon: The Morning Star of Slavonic Literature (1923), by Alphonse Mucha, The Slav Epic

Tsar Simeon I has remained among the most highly valued Bulgarian historical figures, as indicated by popular vote in the Velikite Bǎlgari (a spin-off of 100 Greatest Britons) television programme, which in February 2007 placed him fourth among the greatest Bulgarians ever. Simeon the Great has been regularly featured in fiction. Bulgarian national writer Ivan Vazov dedicated a children's patriotic poem to him, "Tsar Simeon", and it was later arranged as a song, "Kray Bosfora šum se vdiga" ("A Clamour Rises by the Bosphorus"). An eleven-episode drama series filmed in 1984, Zlatniyat vek (The Golden Age), retells the story of Simeon's reign. In the series, the tsar is played by Marius Donkin. A historical drama play called Tsar Simeon Veliki – Zlatniyat vek produced by Stefan Staychev, director of the Silistra Theatre, premiered in December 2006. Ivan Samokovliev stars in the part of Simeon.

The painting, "The Bulgarian Tsar Simeon" is part of the 20-canvas work by Alfons Mucha, The Slav Epic.

The last Bulgarian monarch, Simeon Saxe-Coburg-Gotha, was named after Simeon I. A brand of high-quality grape rakija, Car Simeon Veliki, also bears his name, and an Antarctic peak on Livingston Island of the South Shetland Islands was named Simeon Peak in his honour by the Antarctic Place-names Commission.

== Timeline ==
Timeline of Simeon I's life

== Footnotes ==
Preceded by Vladimir	Tsar of Bulgaria; 893–927	Succeeded by Peter I
