= Mihail of Bulgaria =

Bulgarian prince

Mihail (Church Slavonic: Михаилъ Bulgarian: Михаил) or Michael was the eldest son of Emperor Simeon I The Great. The date of his birth is unknown, but it is before 900. Mihail was born to Simeon's first wife.

Mihail's father Simeon preferred to designate his younger son Peter I as heir to the throne, possibly because Peter was born to his second (and last) consort, and Mihail was to take monastic vows and become a monk. However, he felt neglected and wanted to assume the throne by force.

When Peter was crowned Emperor in 927, the prince managed to escape from the monastery and captured a fortress in the region of Macedonia where he openly declared his aims. Initially, Mihail had some success, as many Bulgarians joined the rebellion in his support, but his unexpected death spoiled the plans of his supporters and forced them to flee from Bulgaria.
