= George Sursuvul =

George Sursuvul (Bulgarian: Георги Сурсувул) or Sursubul, was the first minister and regent of the First Bulgarian Empire during the reigns of Simeon I (r. 893–927) and Peter I (r. 927–969).

== Biography ==
According to the chroniclers, George Sursuvul was a brother of Simeon I’s second wife, who was the mother of Peter I. After the death of Simeon I, he ruled Bulgaria (927-928) as a regent for adolescent Peter I and his younger brothers John and Benjamin. George Sursuvul retired from the regency after concluding a peace treaty with the Byzantine emperor Romanos I Lekapenos, one of which terms was a marriage of George Sursuvul’s nephew Peter I to Byzantine Emperor’s granddaughter Maria Lakapenos (renamed Eirene).

George Sursuvul initiated the peace treaty with Byzantine Empire by sending an envoy to Constantinople in utmost secrecy, suggesting a treaty and a marriage-alliance. George Sursubul, heading a delegation of Simeon I’s brother-in-law Symeon, Calutarkan, courtier Sampses, and numerous nobilities, met with Romanos I in 927 and concluded the peace treaty which ended the Byzantine–Bulgarian war of 913–927. Afterwards, he presided at the marriage ceremony as a witness on the bridegroom’s side, with his counterpart on the Byzantine side being the Byzantine Prime Minister.

George Sursuvul was a granduncle to Boris II of Bulgaria. The timing of his retirement from the post of Prime Minister is unknown. The historian Steven Runciman cites a description of George Sursuvul as an ambassador to the Byzantine Court left by Otto I’s Frankish ambassador Bishop Liudprand of Cremona, offended those Bulgarian ambassadors at Constantinople had precedence over all other ambassadors: his head was shaven, he wore a brass belt and trousers.

== Honours ==
Sursuvul Point on Davis Coast, Antarctica is named after George Sursuvul.

== Sources ==
- Runciman, Steven (1930). "Emperor of the Bulgars and the Romans". A history of the First Bulgarian Empire. London: George Bell & Sons. OCLC 832687.
