= 837 =

Calendar year

837 in various calendars
- Gregorian calendar: 837; DCCCXXXVII
- Ab urbe condita: 1590
- Armenian calendar: 286; ԹՎ ՄՁԶ
- Assyrian calendar: 5587
- Balinese saka calendar: 758–759
- Bengali calendar: 243–244
- Berber calendar: 1787
- Buddhist calendar: 1381
- Burmese calendar: 199
- Byzantine calendar: 6345–6346
- Chinese calendar: 丙辰年 (Fire Dragon); 3534 or 3327 — to — 丁巳年 (Fire Snake); 3535 or 3328
- Coptic calendar: 553–554
- Discordian calendar: 2003
- Ethiopian calendar: 829–830
- Hebrew calendar: 4597–4598
- Hindu calendars
- Vikram Samvat: 893–894
- Shaka Samvat: 758–759
- Kali Yuga: 3937–3938
- Holocene calendar: 10837
- Iranian calendar: 215–216
- Islamic calendar: 222–223
- Japanese calendar: Jōwa 4 (承和４年)
- Javanese calendar: 733–734
- Julian calendar: 837; DCCCXXXVII
- Korean calendar: 3170
- Minguo calendar: 1075 before ROC 民前1075年
- Nanakshahi calendar: −631
- Seleucid era: 1148/1149 AG
- Thai solar calendar: 1379–1380
- Tibetan calendar: མེ་ཕོ་འབྲུག་ལོ་ (male Fire-Dragon); 963 or 582 or −190 — to — མེ་མོ་སྦྲུལ་ལོ་ (female Fire-Snake); 964 or 583 or −189

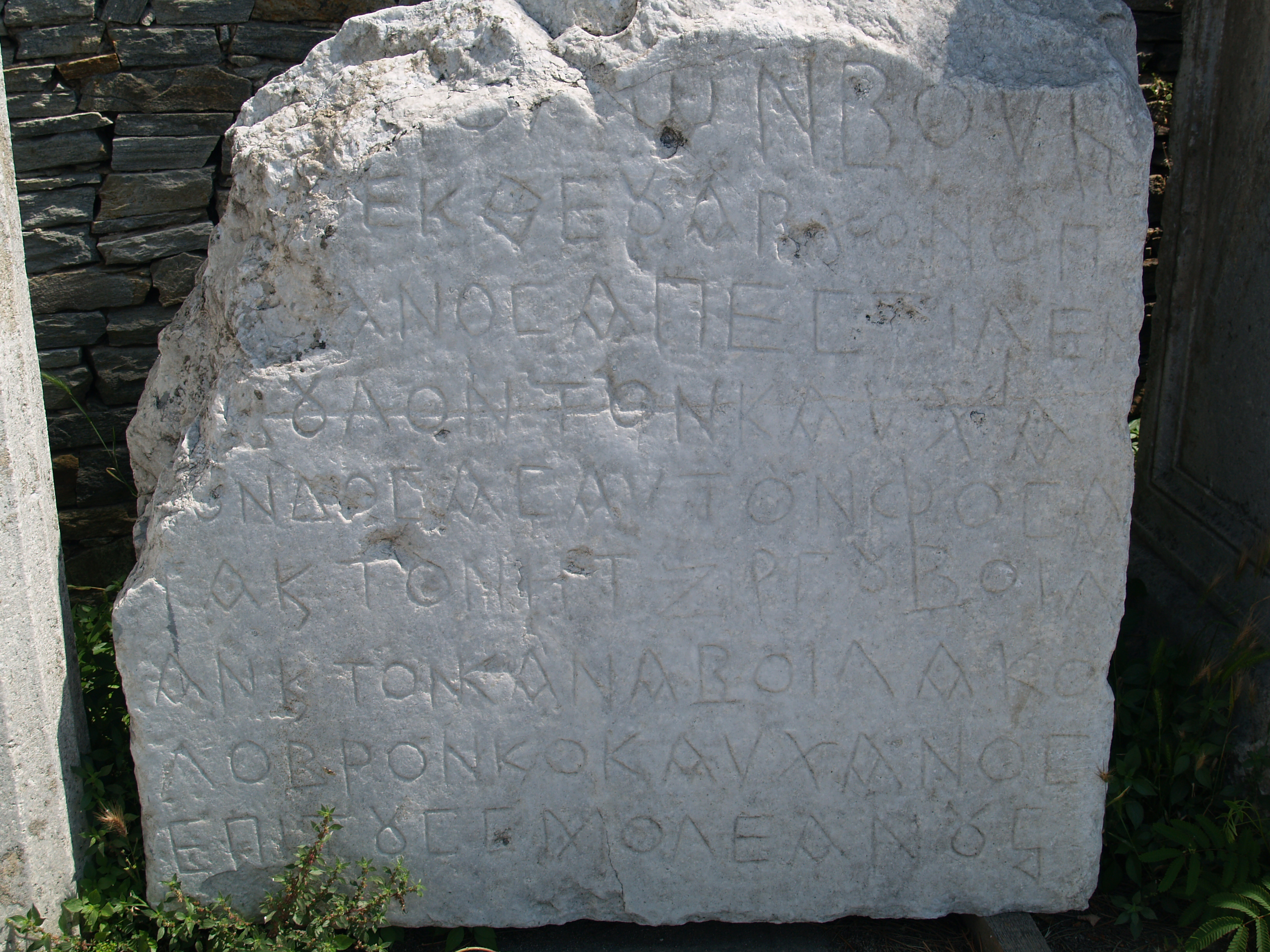
The Presian Inscription (Philippi, Greece)

Year 837 (DCCCXXXVII) was a common year starting on Monday of the Julian calendar.

== Events ==
=== By place ===
==== Byzantine Empire ====
- Byzantine–Arab War: Emperor Theophilos leads a massive Byzantine expeditionary force into Mesopotamia. He sacks the cities Arsamosata and Sozopetra — which some sources claim as the birthplace of Abbasid caliph Al-Mu'tasim — and forces Melitene to pay tribute.
- The Slavs in the vicinity of Thessaloniki revolt against the Byzantine Empire. Theophilos undertakes an evacuation of some Byzantine captives, who are settled in trans-Danubian Bulgaria.

==== Europe ====
- Presian I, ruler (khan) of the Bulgarian Empire, sends his prime-minister Isbul against the Smolyani (a Slavic tribe in Byzantine territory near the Struma River). The Bulgarian army campaigns along the Aegean coasts, and conquers most of Thrace and Macedonia, including the fortress city of Philippi, as recorded in the Presian Inscription.
- The city of Naples (modern Italy) is attacked by Saracens from Egypt demanding an annual payment (approximate date).

==== Britain ====
- King Drest IX dies after a 3-year reign. He is succeeded as ruler of the Picts by his cousin Eóganan mac Óengusa.

=== By topic ===
==== Astronomy ====
- April 10 – Halley's Comet passes approximately 5 million km from Earth, its closest ever approach.

== Births ==
- November – Al-Muntasir, Muslim caliph (d. 862)
- Baldwin I, margrave of Flanders (approximate date)
- Ibn Duraid, Muslim poet and philologist (d. 933)
- Lothair II, king of Lotharingia (d. 869) (approximate date)

== Deaths ==
- January 1 – Peter of Atroa, Byzantine abbot (b. 773)
- January 21 – Antony I, patriarch of Constantinople
- June 4 – Li Zaiyi, Chinese general of the Tang dynasty (b. 788)
- Drest IX, king of the Picts
- Eadwulf, Anglo-Saxon bishop of Lindsey (approximate date)
- Giovanni I Participazio, deposed doge of Venice
- Hugh of Tours, Frankish nobleman
- Maxentius, patriarch of Aquileia (approximate date)
- Oliba I of Carcassonne, Frankish nobleman
