= Malamir chronicle =

Epigraphic monument in medieval Greek

The Malamir chronicle or Malamir inscription is an epigraphic monument in medieval Greek created by order of Bulgarian Khan Malamir (r. 831–836). The syenite column with the inscription was found in the late 1800s in the Turkish cemetery near the Tombul Mosque in Shumen, northeastern Bulgaria, and is tentatively dated to the year 836.

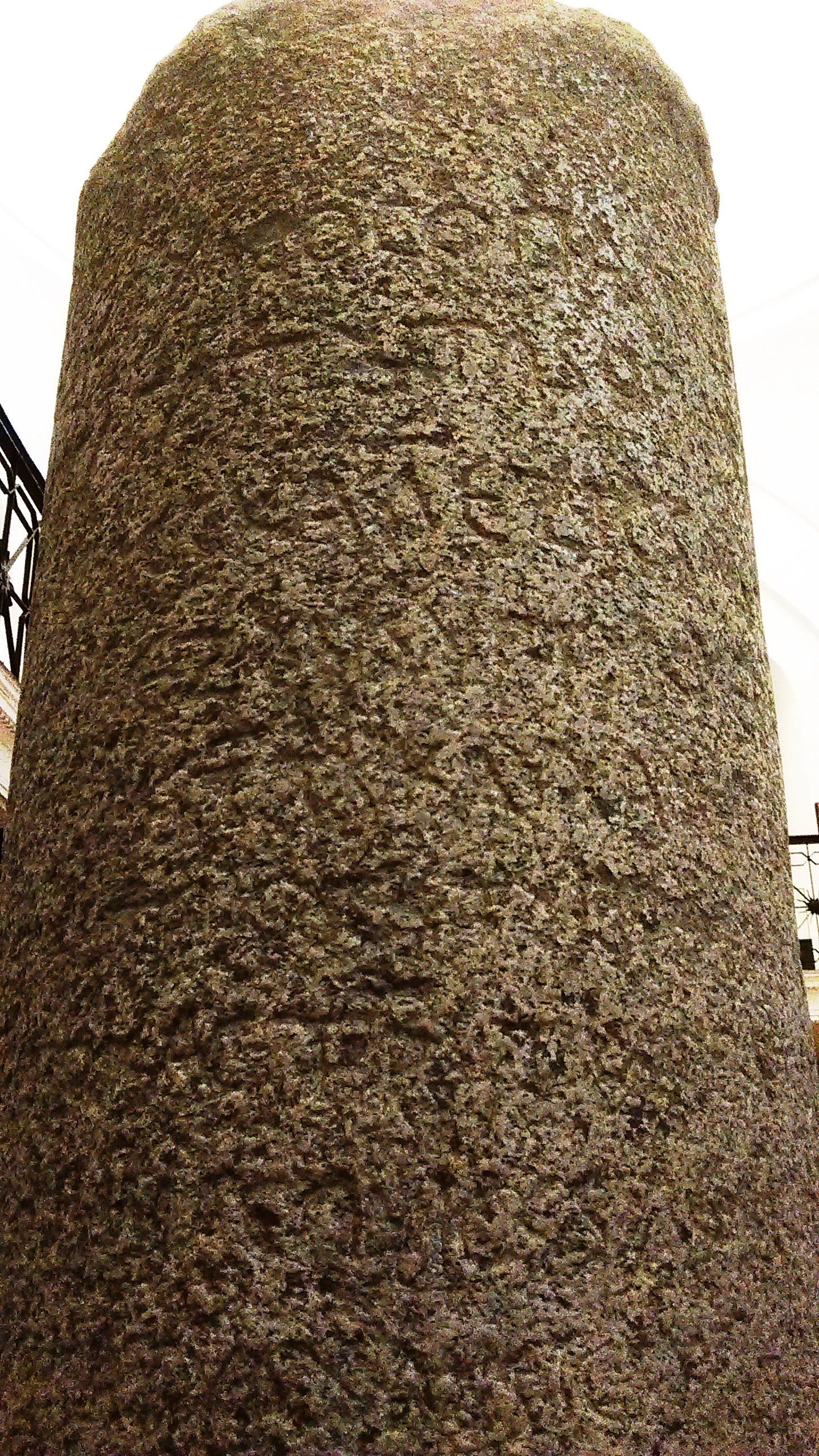
The Malamir inscription, currently on exhibit at the National Archaeological Museum in Sofia

== Background and content ==
The column isapproximately 2.5 metres tall, and even though the text is preserved in its entirety, the carving is too shallow, and the letters, primarily in the beginning and the end, have partially worn away, making them difficult to read. The inscription is very valuable as it is one of very few sources to explicitly mention Malamir's reign, resolving a decades-long dispute on whether Malamir and his successor, Presian, were separate rulers or the same khan under two different names.

=== Original text and translation ===
Original text

(ΚΑΝΑ ΣΥΒΗΓΙ ΜΑΛΑΜΙΡ)
[Ο ΕΚ ΘΕ]ΟΥ ΑΡΧ(ΩΝ) Ο ΚΡΟΥΜΟΣ Ο ΠΑΠΟΣ ΜΟΥ ΜΕΤΑ Η-
ΜΑΣ ΕΒΡΕΝ ΤΑ (ΕΡ)ΓΑ ΤΟΥΤΑ ΚΕ Ο ΠΑΤΗΡ ΜΟΥ Ο Α[ΡΧΩΝ ΟΜΟΥΡΤΑΓ]
ΕΡΙΓΗΝ Λʹ ΕΤ(ΩΝ) ΠΥΙΣΑΣ ΚΕ ΚΑΛΑ ΕΖΙΣ(ΕΝ) ΜΕΤΑ ΤΟΥΣ ΓΡ[ΙΚΟΥΣ]
ΚΕ ΤΟ ΑΡΓΕ(ΟΝ) ΚΑΛΑ ΕΖΟΥΝ ΚΕ ΟΙ ΓΡΙΚΥ ΕΡΗΜΟΣΑ(Ν) ΤΑ [ΧΟΡΙΑ ΗΜΩΝ]
ΚΕ Ο ΑΡΧΩΝ Ο ΜΑΛΑΜΙΡ ΜΕΤ(Α) Τ(ΟΝ) ΚΑΥΧΑΝΟΝ ΙΣΒΟΥΛ(ΟΝ) ΕΠΑ[ΡΙΟΝ]
ΜΕΤΑ ΛΑ(ΟΝ) ΗΛΘ(ΕΝ) ΙΣ ΤΟΥΣ ΓΡΙΚΟΥΣ ΚΕ ΤΟΥ ΠΡΟΒΑΤΟΥ ΤΟ ΚΑΣ[ΤΡΟΝ]
<ΚΑΣΤΡ(ΟΝ)> ΚΕ ΤΟΥ ΒΟΥΡΔΙΖΟΥ ΤΟ ΚΑΣΤΡ(ΟΝ) ΚΕ ΤΑ ΧΩΡ(Ι)Α ΤΟΝ ΓΡΙΚ(ΟΝ) Ε[Ρ-
ΗΜΟΣΕΝ?], ΚΕ ΑΠΑΣ(ΑΝ) ΦΥΜ(ΗΝ) ΕΠΥΣΤ(ΕΝ) ΚΕ ΗΛΘ(ΕΝ) ΙΣ ΦΙΛΙΠΠΟΠΟΛ[ΙΝ
ΚΕ ΟΙ ΓΡΙΚΥ Ε]ΦΥΓΑ(Ν) ΚΕ ΤΟΤΕ Ο ΚΑΥΧΑ<ΧΑ>Ν(ΟΣ) ΙΣΒΟΥΛ(ΟΣ) ΣΥΝΤΥΧΙΑ(Ν) ΕΠΥ-
[ΙΣΕΝ Μ]ΕΤΑ ΤΟ(Ν) ΑΡΧ(ΟΝ)ΤΑ ΤΟ(Ν) ΥΠΕΡΦΥΜ(ΟΝ) ΠΡΟΣ ΤΟΥΣ ΦΙΛΙ(ΠΟΠΟΛΙΤΑΣ)

English translation

(Kana subigi Malamir)
[The archon from G]od, Krum, my grandfather, together with
us found these works; and my father, the [archon Omurtag],
having concluded a thirty-year peace, lived on good terms with the Greeks;
and at first I too lived on good terms with them, but the Greeks laid waste to our [lands].
And the archon Malamir, together with the kavkhan Isbul, marched
with an army against the Greeks and [laid waste] the fortress of Provat
and the fortress of Burdizon and the lands of the Greeks; he laid
[them waste], won great renown and came to Philippopolis.
The Greeks fled, and then the kavkhan Isbul held a meet-
ing, together with the most glorious archon, with the people of Philippopolis.

== Historical context ==
Due to the fragmentary historical evidence, it is assumed that the Byzantine Emperor Theophilos violated the terms of the Thirty-Year Peace Treaty between Bulgaria and the Eastern Roman Empire, signed by Malamir's father, Omurtag, in 815. However, the attack apparently met stiff resistance, and the Bulgarians under Malamir and his first minister, Kavkhan Isbul, laid waste to Eastern Thrace and conquered the region of Philippopolis.

== See also ==
- Presian inscription
- Omurtag's Tarnovo inscription
- Kanasubigi

== Bibliography ==
- Beshevliev, Veselin (1992) [1979]. Първобългарски надписи [Old Bulgarian Inscriptions] (in Bulgarian) (2nd ed.). Sofia: Publishing House of the Bulgarian Academy of Sciences. Archived from the original on 2023-06-03.
- Beshevliev, Veselin (1981). Прабългарски епиграфски паметници [Proto-Bulgarian Epigraphic Monuments] (in Bulgarian). Sofia: Publishing House of the Fatherland Front. Archived from the original on 2026-06-06.
- Curta, Florin (2019). Eastern Europe in the Middle Ages (500-1300). Brill. ISBN 978-90-04-39519-0.
- Fine, John V. A. Jr. (1991) [1983]. The Early Medieval Balkans: A Critical Survey from the Sixth to the Late Twelfth Century. Ann Arbor: University of Michigan Press. ISBN 0-472-08149-7.
- Hupchik, Dennis P. (2002). The Balkans: From Constantinople to Communism. New York: PALGRAVE. ISBN 0-312-29913-3.
- Petkov, Kiril (2008). The Voices of Medieval Bulgaria: Seventh-Fifteenth Centuries: The Records of a Bygone Culture. Brill: Leiden.
