= Presian inscription =

Epigraphic monument in medieval Greek

The Presian Inscription or Philippi Inscription is an epigraphic monument in medieval Greek created during the reign of the Bulgarian ruler Presian I (r. 836–852). The inscription, hewn into rectangular marble slabs, was found on the archaeological site of ancient Philippi in northern Greece and is only partially preserved, with only two out of six slabs surviving till present day.

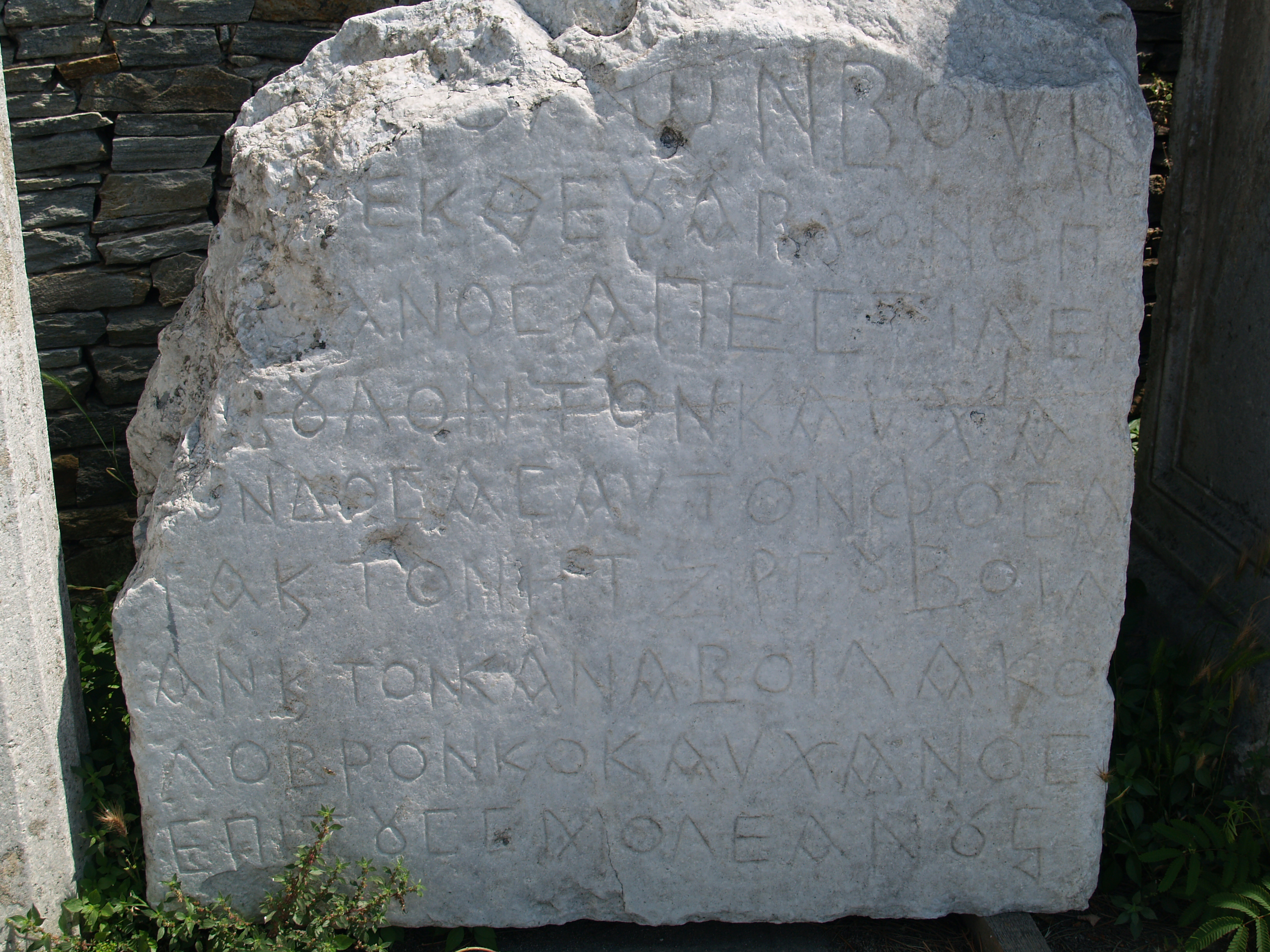
Presian inscription, first plate, Archeology Museum, Philippi, Greece.

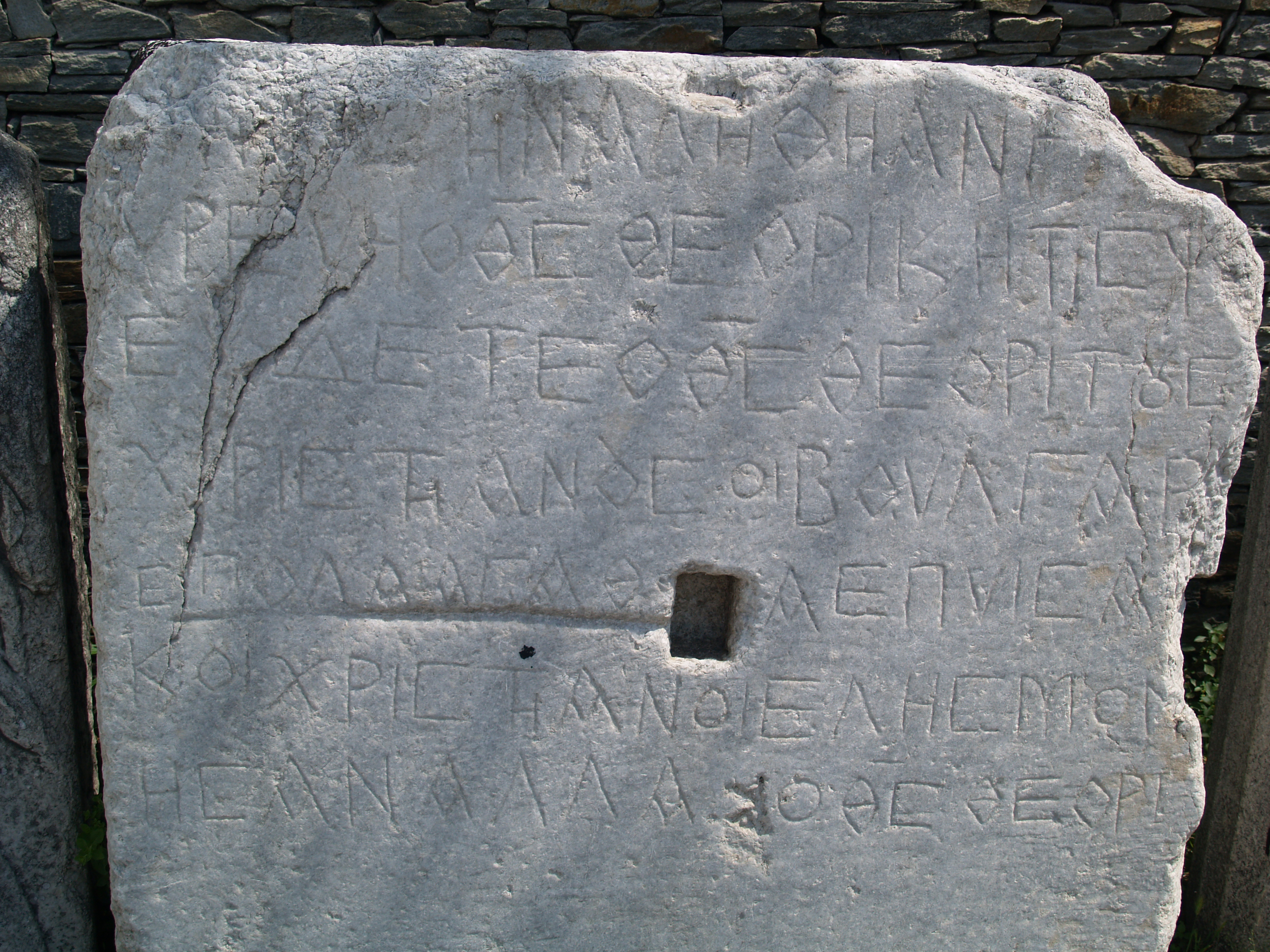
Presian inscription, sixth plate, Archeology Museum, Philippi, Greece.

== Background ==
The inscription was first discovered and copied, somewhat incorrectly, by French Jesuit missionary Père Braconnier in 1707. After being covered again in soil, it was rediscovered during the excavation of the Christian basilica in Philippi between 1922 and 1933. Only the first and the last one of the six marble slabs are fully preserved, along with several small fragments which have proven impossible to place correctly due to their size. At a length of estimated 43 lines (27 of which are missing or are preserved only in the form of fragments), this is one of the longest surviving inscriptions from the time of the First Bulgarian Empire. The marble slabs are currently stored at the Archeology Museum in Philippi.

== Content ==
Original text
[ΤΟ]Ν ΠΟΛΩΝ ΒΟΥ(Λ)ΓΑΡΟΝ [Ο] ΕΚ ΘΕΟΥ ΑΡΧΟΝ Ο ΠΕΡΣΙΑΝΟΣ ΑΠΕΣΤΙΛΕΝ Ι[Σ]ΒΟΥΛΟΝ ΤΟΝ ΚΑΥΧΑ ΝΟΝ ΔΟΣΑΣ ΑΘΤΟΝ ΦΟΣΑΤΑ Κ(Ε) ΤΟΩ ΗΤΞΙΡΓΟΥ ΒΟΙΛΑΝ Κ(Ε) ΤΟΝ ΚΑΝΑ ΒΟΙΛΑ ΚΟΛΟΒΡΟΝ Κ(Ε) Ο ΚΑΥΧΑΝΟΣΕΠΙ ΤΟΥΣ ΣΜΟΛΕΑΝΟΥΣ Ο-......ΝE......ΧΟ......MHN......IEV......ΑΓΑΘ......ΤΟ......ΕΠ......ΑVΤΟ......Η [ΤΗΣ] ΤΗΝ ΑΛΗΘΗΝΑΝ ΓΥΡΕΥΗ, Ο Θ(ΕΟΣ) ΘΕΟΡΙ.Κ(Ε), Η ΤΗΣ ΨΕΥΔΕΤΕ, Ο Θ(ΕΟΣ) ΘΕΟΡΙ. ΤΟΥΣΧΡΙΣΤΗΑΝΟΥΣ ΟΙ ΒΟΥΛΓΑΡΙΣ ΠΟΛΑ ΑΓΑΘΑ ΕΠΥΙΣΑ[Ν] Κ(Ε) ΟΙ ΧΡΙΣΤΗΑΝΟΙ ΕΛΗΣΜΟΝ ΗΣΑΝ, ΑΛΛΑ Ο Θ(ΕΟ)Σ ΘΕΟΡΙ.

English translation
Presian, from God ruler of the many Bulgars sent Kavkhan Isbul, giving him troops, and the Ichirgu-boila, and the Khan Boila Kolober. And the Kavkhan went to the Smolyani......When someone tells the truth, God sees. And when someone lies, God sees that too. The Bulgars did many favors to the Christians, but the Christians forgot them. But God sees.

== Historical context ==
In 837, soon after Presian's accession to the Bulgarian throne, the Slavs in the vicinity of Thessalonica rebelled against the Byzantine Empire. Emperor Theophilos sought Bulgarian support in putting down the rebellion, but simultaneously arranged for his fleet to sail through the Danube delta and undertake a clandestine evacuation of some of the Byzantine captives settled in Transdanubian Bulgaria by Bulgarian rulers Krum and Omurtag. In retaliation, Kavkhan Isbul campaigned along the Aegean coasts of Thrace and Macedonia and captured the city of Philippi, where he set up a surviving memorial inscription in a local church. Isbul's campaign resulted in the establishment of Bulgarian suzerainty over the local Slavic tribe of the Smolyani, as well as most likely over the entire region between the lower courses of the Mesta and the Struma — which was clearly in Bulgarian possession at the beginning of the reign of Boris I. There is also a possibility that Presian's campaign was but a continuation of Malamir's march in Thrace in 836, which was put on hold due to Malamir's death.

== See also ==
- Malamir chronicle
- Smolyani

== Bibliography ==
- Beshevliev, Veselin (1992) [1979]. Първобългарски надписи [Old Bulgarian Inscriptions] (in Bulgarian) (2nd ed.). Sofia: Publishing House of the Bulgarian Academy of Sciences. Archived from the original on 2023-06-03.
- Beshevliev, Veselin (1981). Прабългарски епиграфски паметници [Proto-Bulgarian Epigraphic Monuments] (in Bulgarian). Sofia: Publishing House of the Fatherland Front. Archived from the original on 2026-06-06.
- Curta, Florin (2019). Eastern Europe in the Middle Ages (500-1300). Brill. ISBN 978-90-04-39519-0.
- Fine, John V. A. Jr. (1991) [1983]. The Early Medieval Balkans: A Critical Survey from the Sixth to the Late Twelfth Century. Ann Arbor: University of Michigan Press. ISBN 0-472-08149-7.
- Hupchik, Dennis P. (2002). The Balkans: From Constantinople to Communism. New York: PALGRAVE. ISBN 0-312-29913-3.
- Petkov, Kiril (2008). The Voices of Medieval Bulgaria: Seventh-Fifteenth Centuries: The Records of a Bygone Culture. Brill: Leiden.
