= Smolyani =

The Smolyani (Bulgarian: смоляни; in Byzantine sources Smolenoi or Smoleanoi) were a medieval Slavic tribe that settled in the Rhodope Mountains, the valley of the Mesta River and the region around Blagoevgrad Province, possibly in the 7th–8th century. The tribe revolted against the Byzantine authorities of Constantinople in 837 and were supported by Bulgarian ruler Presian, who, together with his deputy Kavhan Isbul, crossed the lands of the Smolyani and conquered the territory as far south as Philippi, including most of Macedonia. Their name etymologically derives from the Proto-Slavic word *smola ('resin'), with same derivation being ethnonym of the West Slavic tribe of Smeldingi and the East Slavic toponym of the city of Smolensk. The city of Smolyan in southern Bulgaria is named after this tribe.

== See also ==
- List of early Slavic peoples
- Presian Inscription

== Sources ==
- Collective (2002). Balgarska entsiklopediya A-YA (in Bulgarian). Sofia: IK Trud.
