= Zvinitsa =

Bulgarian prince

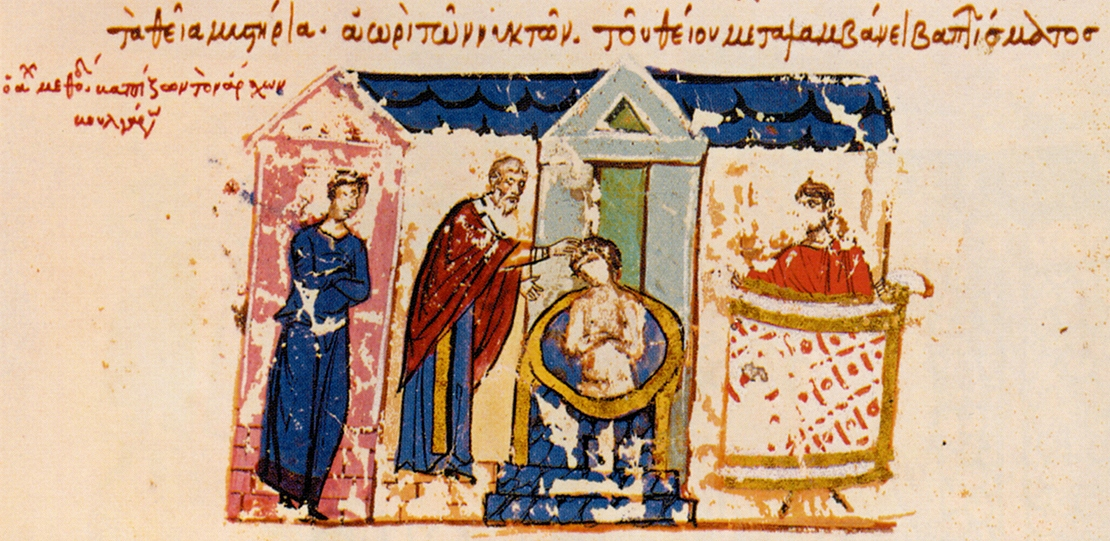
Baptism of Zvinitsa's grandson Boris, through whom Zvinitsa was an ancestor of later rulers of Bulgaria

Zvinitsa (Bulgarian: Звиница, Zviniča; called Zbēnitzēs in the Greek sources) was a Bulgarian nobleman who lived in the 9th century. Son of Bulgarian ruler Omurtag and father of Presian I.

== Life ==
Zvinitsa was a son of the Khan Omurtag and an unknown woman, and thus a grandson of Krum and brother to Enravota and Malamir. As the second son of his father, Zvinitsa was not expected to become a ruler of the Bulgarians. Zvinitsa married an unknown woman, who bore him at least one child, the son named Presian.

After the death of Omurtag, Malamir became new ruler, because the eldest sibling, Enravota, was considered dangerous, since he was interested in Christianity, whilst Zvinitsa died before his father. Malamir ordered the execution of Enravota. After Malamir's death, Presian became a ruler as Presian I, and through him, Zvinitsa was a grandfather of the Prince Boris I and Lady Anna.
