= Malamir of Bulgaria =

Khan of Bulgaria from 831 to 836

Malamir Маламир
- Khan of Bulgaria
- Reign: 831–836
- Predecessor: Omurtag
- Successor: Presian
- Died: 836
- House: Krum's dynasty (possibly Dulo)
- Father: Omurtag of Bulgaria

Malamir (Bulgarian: Маламир) (died 836) was Khan of the First Bulgarian Empire from 831 to 836. Despite a relatively short rule, he continued Bulgaria's territorial expansion initiated by his grandfather, Krum, with the conquest of the western part of the Upper Thracian Plain and the city of Plovdiv (Philippopolis) after repelling an unsuccessful Byzantine invasion.

== Reign ==
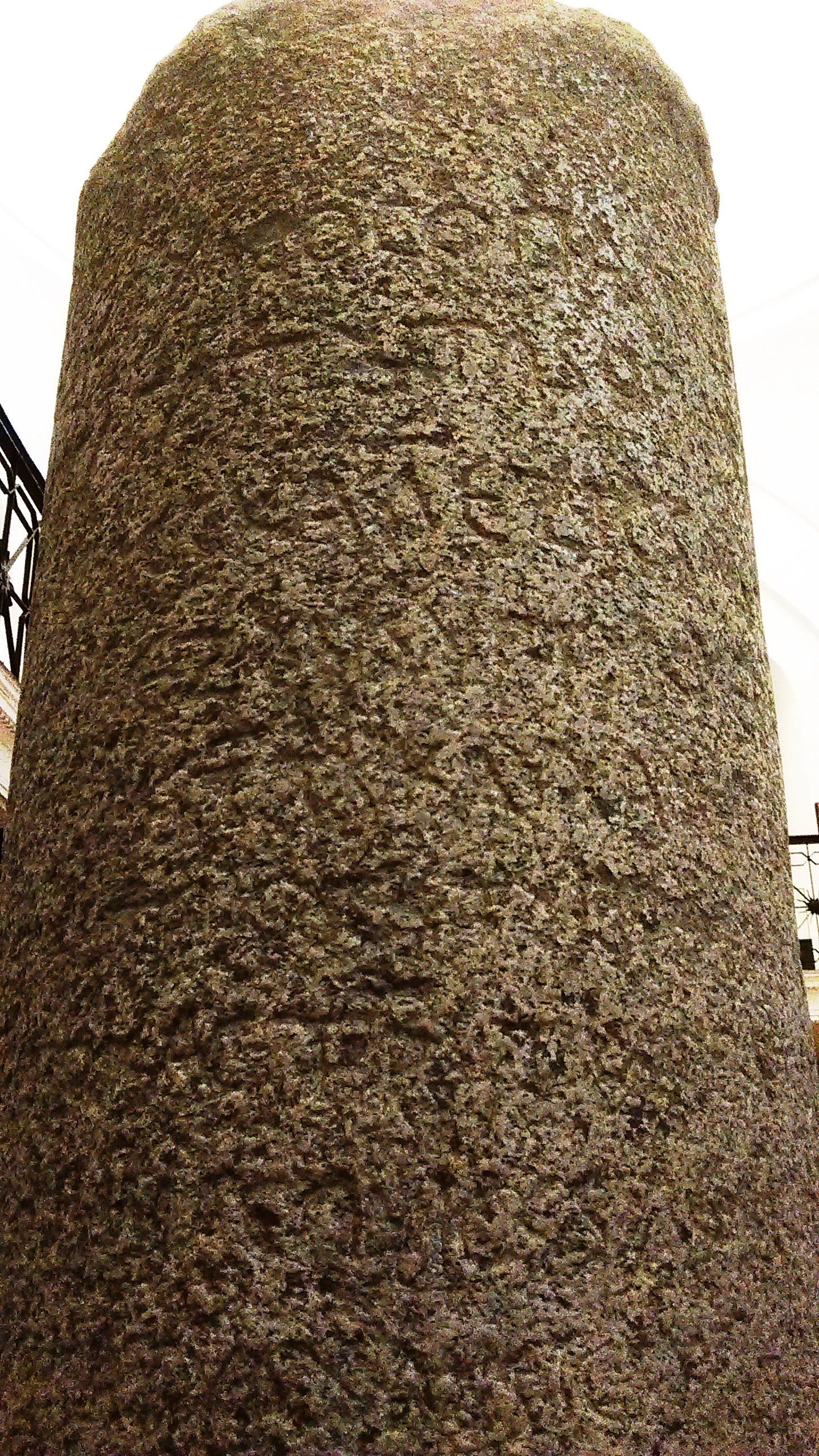
The Malamir chronicle is an epigraphic monument about Malamir's victorious campaigns against Byzantine Emperor Theophilos

Malamir was the son of Omurtag (r. 814–831) and grandson of Krum (r. 803–814). He was the first Bulgarian khan to bear a Slavic name — indicative of the ongoing fusion between Bulgars and Slavs during the period. Malamir became ruler of Bulgaria in 831 upon the death of his father Omurtag after his older brother Enravota (Voin) forfeited his right to succession by becoming a Christian. Judging by the mention of his first minister, Kavkhan (kaukhanos) Isbul, in both epigraphic monuments left by Malamir, the Malamir chronicle from Shumen and the Vasilika inscription from Khalkidiki, the young ruler was underage at the time of his accession, and state affairs were dominated by Isbul, who also acted as regent.

Malamir continued Omurtag's internal policy of persecution of Christians. According to Theophylact of Ohrid, Malamir had Enravota executed in 832 or 833, after his older brother refused to renounce his faith. Foreign policy was dominated by renewed hostilities with the Byzantine Empire. In 836, Emperor Theophilos violated the terms of the Thirty-Year Peace Treaty signed by his father, Michael II, and Omurtag, and ravaged Bulgaria's border regions. However, the attack was repelled, and the Bulgarian army led by Isbul in turn laid waste to Eastern Thrace, destroying several fortresses in the vicinity of Adrianople, including Burdizon, modern-day Babaeski. During the same campaign, Malamir and Isbul annexed Plovdiv (Philippopolis ) and its environs after the Greek garrison fled the city.

At some point during or straight after the campaign, Malamir passed away. He was succeeded by the son of his middle brother Zvinitsa, Presian (also sometimes enumerated as Presian I), who continued his predecessor's military campaign against the Byzantines, this time along the Aegean coast of modern Macedonia and Thrace. Isbul was heavily involved again, continuing his decades-long, highly successful career as first minister under a third consecutive Bulgarian Khan. Due to the fragmentary sources about the period, several older studies considered Presian and Malamir to be the same ruler under two different names (a Slavic and a Bulgar one) and the direct predecessor of Boris I. However, based on Constantine Porphyrogenitus's De Administrando Imperio, Theophylact of Ohrid's Letters, the Malamir chronicle and the Presian inscription, modern historiography generally considers Malamir and Presian to be two different persons.

The 17th century Volga Bulgar compilation Cäğfär Taríxı, a work of disputed authenticity, represents Balamir (i.e., Malamir) as the son of Yomyrčak (Omurtag), and as the brother of Sabanša (Zvinitsa), who was the father of Birdžihan (Presian), which lends support to the interpretation currently dominant among historians.

Malamir Knoll on Greenwich Island in the South Shetland Islands, Antarctica, is named for Khan Malamir of Bulgaria.

== See also ==
- History of Bulgaria
- Bulgars
- Malamir chronicle
- Isbul

== Sources ==
- Andreev, Yordan; Lazarov, Ivan; Pavlov, Plamen (1999). Кой кой е в средновековна България [Who is Who in Medieval Bulgaria] (in Bulgarian). Петър Берон. ISBN 978-954-402-047-7.
- Andreev, Yordan; Pantev, Andrey (2004). Българските ханове и царе [Bulgarian Khans and Tsars] (in Bulgarian). Велико Търново: Абагар. ISBN 978-954-427-216-6.
- Beshevliev, Veselin (1992) [1979]. Първобългарски надписи [Old Bulgarian Inscriptions] (in Bulgarian) (2nd ed.). Sofia: Publishing House of the Bulgarian Academy of Sciences. Archived from the original on 2023-06-03.
- Beshevliev, Veselin (1981). Прабългарски епиграфски паметници [Proto-Bulgarian Epigraphic Monuments] (in Bulgarian). Sofia: Publishing House of the Fatherland Front. Archived from the original on 2026-06-06.
- Curta, Florin (2019). Eastern Europe in the Middle Ages (500-1300). Brill. ISBN 978-90-04-39519-0.
- Fine, John V. A. Jr. (1991) [1983]. The Early Medieval Balkans: A Critical Survey from the Sixth to the Late Twelfth Century. Ann Arbor: University of Michigan Press. ISBN 0-472-08149-7.
- Hupchik, Dennis P. (2002). The Balkans: From Constantinople to Communism. New York: PALGRAVE. ISBN 0-312-29913-3.
- Iman, Bahši (1997). Džagfar Tarihy. Vol. III. Orenburg.
- Porphyrogenitus, Constantine (1993). Gy. Moravcsik (ed.). De Administrando Imperio [On imperial administration]. Translated by R. J. H. Jenkins. Washington D. C.: Dumbarton Oaks Center for Byzantine Studies.

Preceded by Omurtag	Khan of Bulgaria; 831–836	Succeeded by Presian I
