= Isbul =

Kavhan of the First Bulgarian Empire

- Allegiance: First Bulgarian Empire
- Service years: 830s (documented)
- Rank: Kavkhan (prime-minister)
- Conflicts: Byzantine–Bulgarian Wars

Isbul (Bulgarian: Исбул) (fl. 820s–830s) was the Kavkhan, or first minister, of the First Bulgarian Empire during the reigns of Omurtag, Malamir and Presian I. Appointed to the kavkhan office under Omurtag, Isbul was a regent or co-ruler of the underage Malamir and his successor Presian.

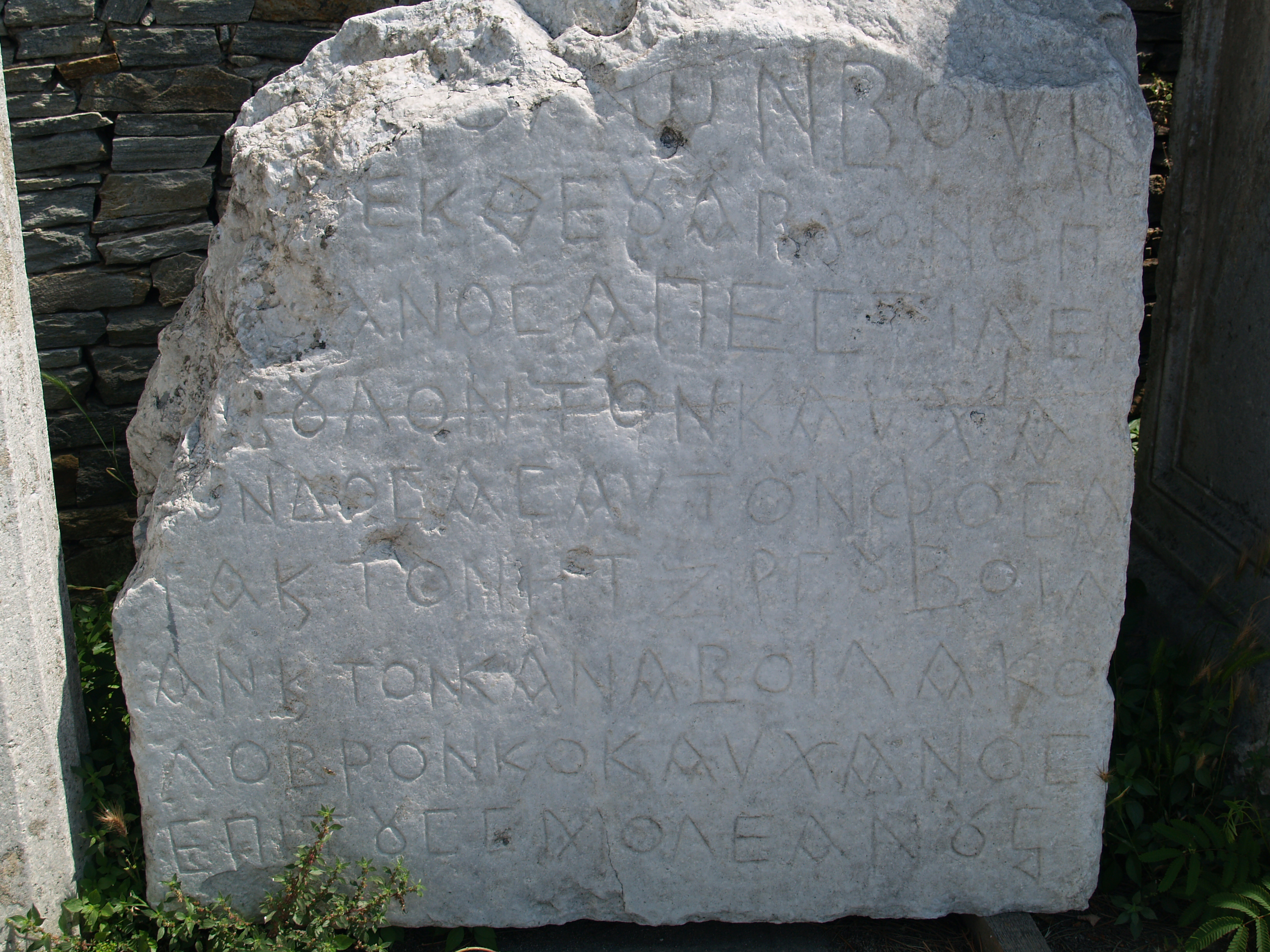
Part of the Presian Inscription, which references Isbul, in the Archaeological Museum of Philippi's lapidarium.

Under Malamir and Presian, Isbul headed Bulgaria's successful campaigns against the Byzantines in southern Thrace and northern and western Macedonia, which led to a significant territorial expansion of the Bulgarian realm. As a co-ruler of Malamir, Isbul also financed the construction of a water conduit in the capital Pliska. As second-in-command, Isbul held enormous power and wealth, and was unusually often mentioned beside the name of the ruler in inscriptions. Due to his merits, Isbul has been described as an architect of medieval Bulgarian statehood by historians.

== Biography ==
The office of the kavkhan was a hereditary title in the First Bulgarian Empire, monopolised by the members of the tentatively known "Kavkhan family". In order to accede to that position, Isbul must have belonged to the kavkhan family, which is indirectly evidenced by his Bulgar name. Historian Plamen Pavlov theorises that Isbul may have begun his career under the ruler Krum (r. 803–814), and by the time of Krum's son Omurtag (r. 815–831), Isbul was already an influential noble. As he is referred to as the kavkhan and regent of the next ruler, Malamir (r. 831–836), it is conjectured that he had been appointed to the office at some point during Omurtag's rule.

The earliest record of Isbul is the stone epigraph known as the Malamir chronicle, which states that Malamir "ruled together with Kavkhan Isbul". Malamir was the youngest son of Omurtag and must have been considered too young to rule by himself, so that a regent had to be appointed. Omurtag specified Malamir as his heir because his eldest son, Enravota, was a Christian. The Byzantines hoped to take advantage of Bulgaria's instability at the time, caused by the presence of the underage Malamir on the throne, and broke the long-lasting peace established with the Byzantine–Bulgarian Treaty of 815, which they had initially reaffirmed upon Malamir's accession. In 836, Isbul was in charge of the Bulgarian forces which repulsed the Byzantine invasion and proceeded to raid into Byzantine territory.

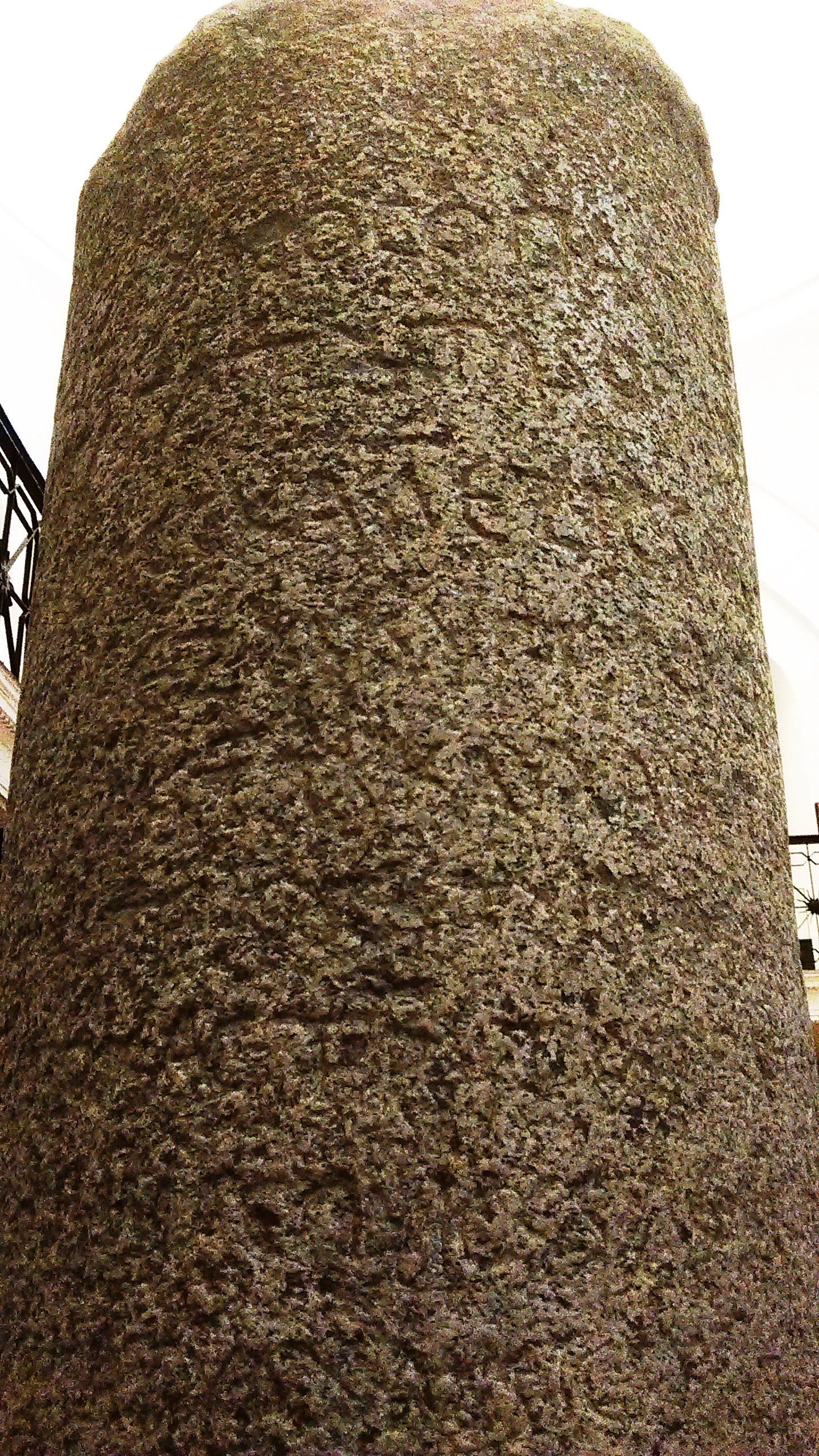
The Malamir chronicle (pictured) and the Vasilika inscription, both dating back to Malamir's reign, also explicitly mention Isbul's role

As part of this campaign, Isbul and Malamir captured the Thracian fortresses of Probaton (near Adrianople) and Bourzidon. After conquering these two fortresses, the Bulgarian troops reached Philippopolis. As the defence forces of the city had fled, Isbul and Malamir entered negotiations with the population in order to persuade them to cede the fortress. Pavlov is of the opinion that the war ended with a continuation of the peace of 815. He believes that Byzantine Emperor Theophilos (r. 829–842) was forced to make concessions to Bulgaria, which may have included the incorporation of Philippopolis and its close surroundings into the Bulgarian Empire.

During his time as co-ruler and kavkhan of Malamir, Isbul financed the construction of a water conduit (aqueduct) or fountain in Pliska, which he donated to Malamir. That construction was the occasion for a great feast, which the ruler organised, and for gifts to the nobility all of it testifying to Isbul's affluence. In the source about the construction, Isbul is hailed alongside Malamir: "May God let the God-appointed ruler live a hundred years together with Kavkhan Isbul". Normally, such blessings were only directed at the ruler, and this is the only case from the First Bulgarian Empire which references another person. The inscription also mentions Isbul's old age at the time.

After the surprise death of Malamir in 836, the Bulgarian throne passed to Presian I (836–852), who too was likely underage. As evidenced by the Presian Inscription from Philippi, Isbul retained his position as Kavkhan and his decisive influence in the Bulgarian court. In 837, the Slavic tribe of the Smolyani (Smolenoi), who inhabited the lower Nestos (Mesta) River and Western Thrace near Drama, rose against their Byzantine rulers. The inscription of Philippi mentions large-scale Bulgarian activity in the lands of the Smolyani. The Bulgarian forces were led by Isbul, as well as the Ichirgu-boil (commander of the capital garrison) and the head priest. As the inscription is damaged, it is unclear who Presian and Isbul supported in that conflict. However, during this campaign the Bulgarian army conquered most of Macedonia including Philippi, where the inscription was found. From that point on, Isbul disappears from the sources, and there is no information about the date and circumstances of his death.

== Assessment and legacy ==
In his biography of Isbul, Pavlov underlines his "extraordinary merits for the development of the Bulgarian state" and describes him as "one of the architects of medieval Bulgarian statehood during the years of its rise". Romanian historian Florin Curta emphasises the similarity of Isbul's role to that of 8th-century Mayors of the Palace in the Frankish lands under the Merovingian dynasty.

Isbul Point on Livingston Island of the South Shetland Islands, Antarctica, was named in honour of Kavkhan Isbul by the Antarctic Place-names Commission of Bulgaria. Isbul also features as a character in Aleksandar Raychev's opera Khan Asparuh, which debuted at the Ruse Opera House in 1981. In the opera, however, Isbul is erroneously described as the Kavkhan of the first Bulgarian ruler, Asparuh.

== See also ==
- History of Bulgaria
- Bulgars
- Kavkhan
- Ichirgu-boil

== Sources ==
- Андреев, Йордан; Лазаров, Иван; Павлов, Пламен (1999). Кой кой е в средновековна България [Who is Who in Medieval Bulgaria] (in Bulgarian). Петър Берон. ISBN 978-954-402-047-7.
- Андреев, Йордан; Пантев, Андрей (2004). Българските ханове и царе [Bulgarian Khans and Tsars] (in Bulgarian). Велико Търново: Абагар. ISBN 978-954-427-216-6.
- Бакалов, Георги; Куманов, Милен (2003). "ИСБУЛ (IX в.)" [ISBUL (9th century)]. Електронно издание "История на България" [Electronic Edition "History of Bulgaria"] (CD) (in Bulgarian). София: Труд, Сирма. ISBN 954528613X.
- Beshevliev, Veselin (1992) [1979]. Първобългарски надписи [Old Bulgarian Inscriptions] (in Bulgarian) (2nd ed.). Sofia: Publishing House of the Bulgarian Academy of Sciences. Archived from the original on 2023-06-03.
- Beshevliev, Veselin (1981). Прабългарски епиграфски паметници [Proto-Bulgarian Epigraphic Monuments] (in Bulgarian). Sofia: Publishing House of the Fatherland Front. OCLC 8554080. Archived from the original on 2026-06-06.
- Curta, Florin (2006). Southeastern Europe in the Middle Ages, 500–1250. Cambridge University Press. ISBN 978-0-521-81539-0.
- Fine, John Van Antwerp (1991). The Early Medieval Balkans: A Critical Survey from the Sixth to the Late Twelfth Century. University of Michigan Press. ISBN 978-0-472-08149-3.
- Ziemann, Daniel (2007). Vom Wandervolk zur Grossmacht: die Entstehung Bulgariens im frühen Mittelalter (7.-9. Jahrhundert) [From Nomads to a Great Power: The Emergence of Bulgaria in the Early Middle Ages (7th–9th Century)] (in German). Böhlau Verlag Köln Weimar. ISBN 978-3-412-09106-4.
