= James Franklin Clarke Jr. =

American historian (1906–1982)

- Born: James Franklin Clarke; June 5, 1906; Bitola, Ottoman Empire
- Died: December 5, 1982 (aged 76); Pittsburgh, Pennsylvania, United States
- Education: Harvard University
- Occupation: Historian

James Franklin Clarke Jr. (June 5, 1906 – December 5, 1982) was an American historian who dedicated his life to the study of the history of the activities of American Protestants and their missionaries on the Balkans, and especially contributed to the spread of Protestantism in Bulgaria. He founded the academic studies on Bulgarian history in the United States.

== Biography ==
He was born on June 5, 1906, to second-generation American missionaries in Bitola, then part of the Ottoman Empire (now in North Macedonia), where his father, William P. Clarke, was a missionary. He was the grandson of James Franklin Clarke Sr., who was one of the first American missionaries among the Bulgarians. During the Balkan Wars and World War I, the Clarke family lived in Bitola. In 1919, they moved to Thessaloniki. They later moved to Switzerland and then to England, where Clarke received primary education. The family moved to the United States, where Clarke graduated from high school in Boston. Clarke was interested in Balkan affairs from his early youth. In 1924, Clarke enrolled at Amherst College in Massachusetts. In 1928, he earned a scholarship to Harvard University, where he received his master's degree. A year later, he started working on his doctoral dissertation on the role of American missionaries in Bulgaria and their impact on the process of the Bulgarian National Revival under the guidance of American historian William L. Langer. From 1931 to 1934, Clarke worked in British and Bulgarian archives and libraries, visiting settlements related to his research. He received assistance from Bulgarian scholars, such as Vasil Zlatarski, Aleksandar Teodorov-Balan, Yordan Ivanov, Petar Nikov, and Mihail Arnaudov. Clarke received his PhD in 1938 with the dissertation Bible Societies, American Missionaries and the National Revival of Bulgaria from Harvard. After receiving his PhD, Clarke worked as a history assistant at Harvard University in Massachusetts Technological Institute, before working as a lecturer of history and political science at Idaho College in 1939. In 1946, he was a press and culture attaché at the US Embassy in Sofia. From 1951 to 1954, he was professor of history at Indiana University, where he became the founder and director of the first Institute for Eastern European Studies. From 1954 to 1976, when he retired, he was affiliated with the University of Pittsburgh. After retirement, Clarke was a consultant to Duquesne University, where he stored his library consisting of maps, posters, ethnographic materials, personal papers, and around 16,000 volumes. He was a founder of the Bulgarian Studies Association and the Mac Gahan American-Bulgarian Foundation, where he served as an executive officer. Clarke was the first president of the former, serving from 1979 to 1982. Clarke also was a member of the American Historical Association, American Association for the Progress of Slavic Studies, American Association for Southeast European Studies, etc.

He adhered to the perception of the Bulgarian identity of the Macedonian Slavs and regarded the Macedonian literary language as a myth. As a pro-Bulgarian historian, he criticized American linguist Horace Lunt, referring to him as the "midwife", Josip Broz Tito as the "father", and Blaže Koneski as the "mother" of Macedonian. He authored a collection of studies on Bulgarian history, called The pen and the sword, edited by Dennis P. Hupchick. The Bulgarian government gave him the Order of Cyril and Methodius (Class I) for his contribution to Bulgarian studies. Despite suffering from cancer, he continued researching and attending conferences. In his last interview with the Bulgarian media in 1981, he cited Mihail Arnaudov, Vasil Zlatarski, Yordan Ivanov, Petar Nikov and Stefan Bobchev as his influences, just like in his doctoral dissertation. On December 5, 1982, Clarke died at his home in Pittsburgh, United States. In his honor, the Association for Bulgarian Studies gave a scholarship for young scientists. Due to his contributions to Bulgarian history, he has been credited as the founder of historical Bulgarian studies in the United States.
