= Decree of Philippi, 242 BCE =

The Decree of Philippi 242 BC was a message from the city of Philippi to the city of Cos in response to an envoy sent by the latter. These messengers requested the asylia, or inviolability, of a sanctuary of Asclepius. The Decree, one of four cities’, is an agreement to respect this request of. The asylia would later be revoked by the Roman emperor Diocletian.

== History of Asylia ==
From the 260s BC to early Roman imperial times, Greek cities sought and received recognition of their asylia from other parts of the Greek world—kings, cities, leagues—and eventually from the Roman Empire itself. Asylia means inviolatibility, or freedom from desecration. What the asylia pertained to in each city's case was different. The city could be asking for the asylia of an important sanctuary belonging to the city, the city itself and the territory surrounding it, or a combination of both. According to M.M. Austin, the reasons for these requests stemmed from the instability of the times. With groups such as the Aetolians inflicting random acts of violence in a time of peace, cities sought protection from their neighbors. What actual benefits came out of these decrees is unclear; they merely state that they recognize the asylia of the requested area.

== The city of Cos ==
Cos, or Kos, is located on the Greek island of the same name. The Dorians invaded in the 11th century, with a strong portion of their people bringing along their Asclepius cult for which the city would become very famous for. The city was also well known for its wine. After the Greco-Persian Wars, Cos joined the Delian League and became a strong Athenian outpost in the Aegean Sea. The city reached its high point during the Hellenistic Period. It was allied with Egypt, and housed an extension of the Alexandrian Library. It was also the home of the famous physician Hippocrates, who is acclaimed as the father of western medicine.

The Asclepius cult garnered a lot of attention for Cos. Asclepius was the Greek god of medicine and healing, a mortal who was granted immortality by Zeus. The original center for the cult was at Epidauros, founded around 500 BCE. However, Cos became another major center due to the large group of people from Epidauros who came with the Dorians. Other centers for the cult were at Pergamon and Athens. The cult itself was elective, in that people, both men and women, from all kinds of social background could participate in cult practices; it was not limited to people who had been chosen for the cult by their parents or who sought initiation later in life. The cult was open to all. To participate, any ill Greek would seek guidance in their dreams by spending the night in the sanctuary. If the god appeared in their dream and either healed them, or suggested a possible cure, then the sick person would make an offering. The cult reached the pinnacle of its popularity in the 4th century BCE.

== The decree ==
In approximately 242, the city of Cos sent envoys to many Macedonian as well as Greek cities. They were received by Heracleodorus, son of Aristion. The messengers requested that these cities recognize the asylia of the Asclepius sanctuary in Cos. In the Decree, the city of Philippi agrees to recognize the sanctuary is inviolate, or asylos. Basically, the Philippians announced that they will not desecrate or disturb the sanctuary based on this truce. The rest of the Decree details how the “sacred ambassadors” honored the government of Philippi and its king, Antigonus, and how the government in turn honored them. The ambassadors provided a sacrifice to Asclepius and the truce with Philippi, and they also renewed kinship with the city. In return, the ambassadors were provided for during their stay in the city, and were also granted escort and money to “ensure their safe journey to Neapolis.” The Decree is found on SEG 12.373, lines 35–55, Rigsby (1996), 138–40, and Hatzopoulos (1996), II no. 36.

== Other responses to envoy ==
The Decree of Philippi is inscribed on the same tablet at two other cities, and the city was only one out of four who responded to the request of Cos. The other cities who responded are Cassandrea and Amphipolis, with decrees inscribed with Philippi’s, and Pella, whose decree was inscribed separately. These cities also agreed to uphold and respect the asylia of the Asclepius sanctuary at Cos. The city of Cos would have benefited greatly from these agreements, since the other cities—especially Philippi and Pella—were important cities in Macedonia. Pella served as administrative capital, and Philippi, the ancient stronghold of Crenidas, was named after Alexander the Great's father Philip II.
