= Presian of Bulgaria =

Khan of Bulgaria from 836 to 852

Presian Пресиян
- Khan of Bulgaria
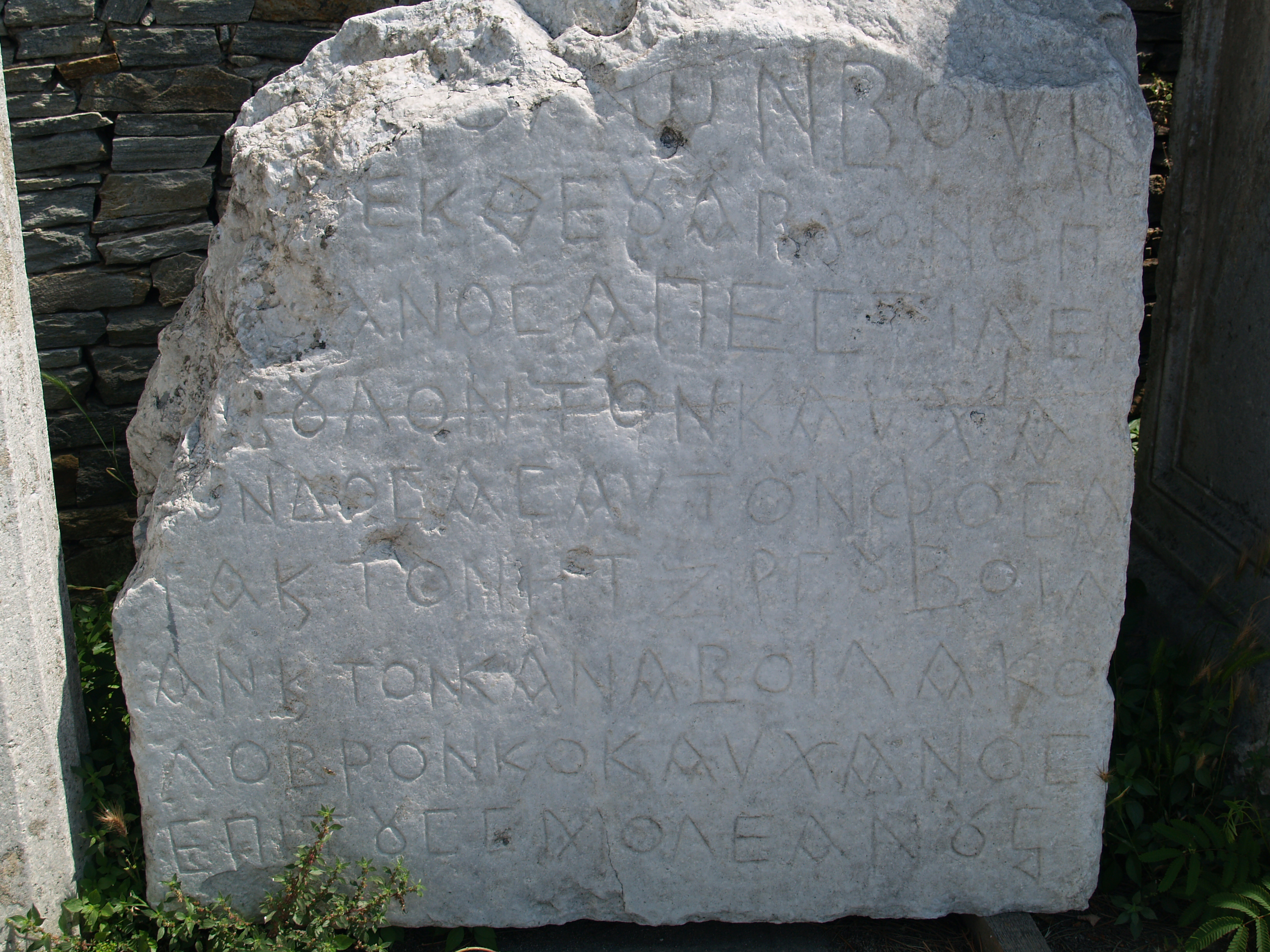
- Presian Inscription, first plate, Archeological Museum, Philippi, Greece.
- Reign: 836–852
- Predecessor: Malamir
- Successor: Boris I
- Died: 852
- Issue: Boris I Anna
- House: Krum's dynasty
- Father: Zvinitsa

Presian, sometimes enumerated as Presian I (Bulgarian: Пресиян, Персиян, Пресиан), was khan of the First Bulgarian Empire from 836 to 852. His reign oversaw a second major expansion of the Bulgarian state after his grandfather, Krum (r. 803–814), doubled Bulgaria's territory in the early 800s. Presian pushed Bulgaria's western border beyond the Great Morava and all the way to the Adriatic sea, annexing the better part of the Macedonian Sclavinias.

== Origin ==
Information about Presian's rule is fragmentary. It comes from just three sources: two short mentions in Constantine Porphyrogenitus's De Administrando Imperio and Theophylact of Ohrid's Letters as well as an epigraphic monument left in the large Christian basilica in Philippi, known as the Presian or Philippi inscription. The composite picture of the three sources indicates that Presian was the son of Zvinitsa (Zbēnitzēs), khan Omurtag's second son, and that he succeeded his short-lived underage nephew, Malamir, in 836 or 837. Several older studies considered Presian and Malamir to be the same ruler under two different names (a Slavic and a Bulgar one) and the direct predecessor of Boris I. However, since Malamir is attested to have been succeeded by his nephew, who was the son of his brother Zvinitsa, while Boris I is documented to have inherited the throne from his father, whose name was Presian, modern historiography considers Malamir and Presian to be two different persons. The 17th century Volga Bulgar compilation Cäğfär Taríxı, a work of disputed authenticity, represents Birdžihan (i.e., Presian) as the son of Sabanša (i.e., Zvinitsa), which lends support to the interpretation of his origins now dominant in modern historiography.

== Territorial expansion ==
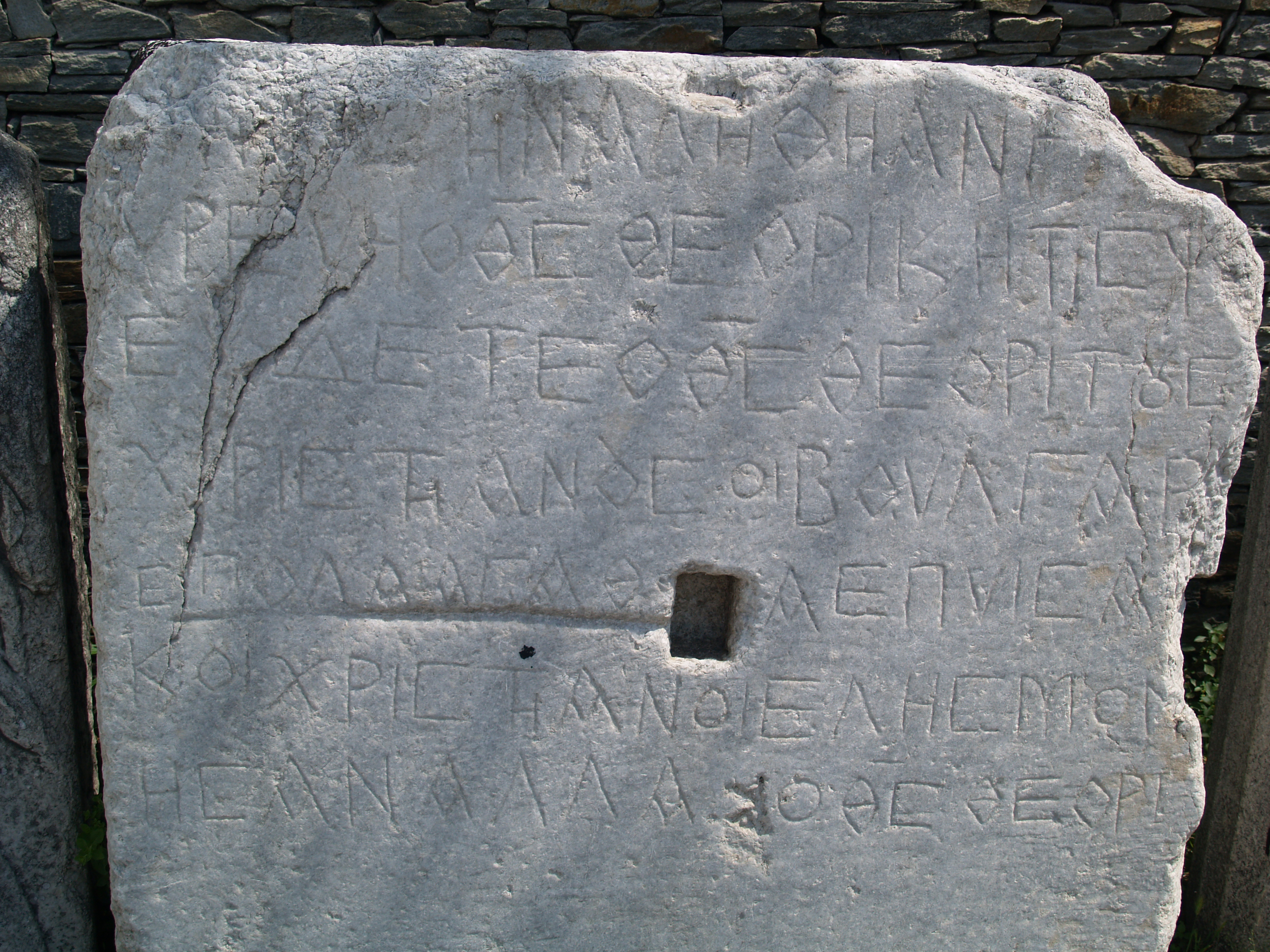
Presian Inscription, sixth plate, Archeological Museum, Philippi, Greece.

At the time of his accession, Presian was probably underage just like his predecessor, Malamir, so state affairs were dominated again by the experienced first minister, Kavkhan Isbul, who also acted as regent. Due to the fragmentary sources, several different timelines have been suggested for Presian's reign. According to one of them, in 837, shortly after Presian's accession to the throne. Byzantine Emperor Theophilos sought Bulgarian support in putting down an anti-Byzantine rebellion that had broken out amongst the Slavs in the vicinity of Thessalonica. At the same time, the Byzantines put in motion a clandestine plan to evacuate the Byzantine captives who had been settled in Transdanubian Bulgaria (present-day southern Bessarabia) by Krum and Omurtag. The prisoners of war originated from the region of Adrianople, i.e., the Byzantine theme of Macedonia, and therefore called themselves "Macedonians". Under the leadership of a certain Kordylas, they staged a revolt and, with the bulk of the Bulgarian army away on campaign, they managed to overpower the forces of the local Bulgarian komit. They were then picked up in the Danube delta by a Byzantine fleet, which took them to Constantinople.

In retaliation, Kavkhan Isbul campaigned along the Aegean coasts of Thrace and Macedonia and captured the city of Philippi, where he set up a surviving memorial inscription in the city's large Chrisitan basilica, the so-called Philippi or Presian inscription. Isbul's campaign resulted in the establishment of Bulgarian suzerainty over the local Slavic tribe of the Smolyani as well as over the entire region between the lower courses of the Mesta and the Struma — which was clearly in Bulgarian possession at the beginning of the reign of Boris I. There is also a distinct possibility that Presian's campaign was simply a continuation of Malamir's march in Thrace in 836, which had been put on hold due to Malamir's death. Presian's campaign then continued north of Thessaloniki, where a number of Sclavinias, from the Struma to the Adriatic sea, which had long gravitated towards the Bulgarian state, finally fell under Bulgarian sovereignty.

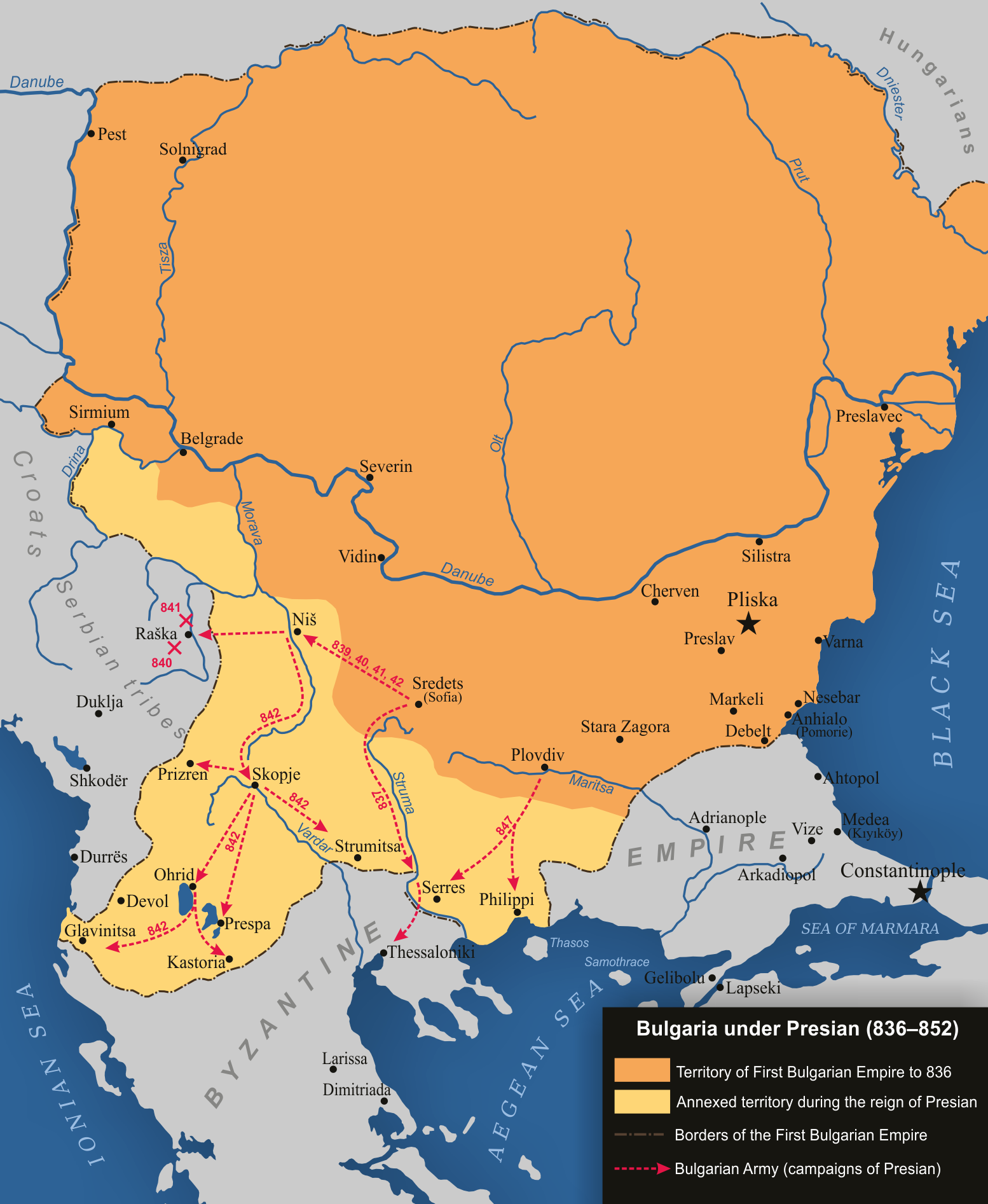
Bulgaria under Presian

According to another timeline, Bulgaria extended its authority over the Sclavinias in present-day Macedonia only in 846, after the so-called Thirty-Year Peace signed between Bulgaria and the Byzantines during the reign of Omurtag, expired, while the third one puts all events, from the rebellion of Kordylas and the "Macedonians" to the push west of the Struma in or around the year 846.

== War with Serbia and later life ==
Bulgaria's territorial expansion along the middle Danube to Belgrade and Sirmium under Khan Krum and Khan Omurtag, and towards Kosovo and modern-day Western Macedonia under Presian effectively put the Serbian tribes between them in a pincer. At the time, the Serbs inhabited the rugged mountainous regions of southeastern Bosnia, northeastern Herzegovina, northern Montenegro and central western Serbia, while the fortress of Ras, which eventually gave its name to the first early medieval Serbian state, the Grand Principality of Raška, was a Bulgarian stronghold that guarded the very frontier between Bulgarians and Serbs. In the 830s, Serbian Prince Vlastimir managed to unite several Serbian tribes, and Byzantine Emperor Theophilos (r. 829–842) granted them independence under the condition that they acknowledged nominal Byzantine suzerainty. It is unclear whether it was Bulgaria's expansionist policy that acted as a catalyst for Serbian unification, or it was the unification itself that made Presian increasingly regard the Serbs as a potential threat in its rear. However, the Byzantines, who actively searched for potential allies against the Bulgars, most certainly played an important role in Vlastimir's efforts, by sending agents and gold to encourage Serbian consolidation. They may have also wanted to divert attention in order to cope with the Slavic Uprising in the Peloponnese and sent the Serbs to instigate the war.

Whatever the reason, Presian invaded Serbia's territory in 839 (or, in the second or third timeline, in 847). The invasion led to a 3-year war, which was ultimately unsuccessful for the Bulgars. Although Presian managed to secure a symbolic tribute, the Serbs retained their independence, and the Bulgarian army suffered heavy losses due to the Serbian tactical advantage in the hills.

The sources remain silent about Presian's rule after the war with Serbia. He died in 852, leaving a greatly enlarged state, with a much strengthened Slavic element, to his son, Boris I.

== Honour ==
Presian Ridge on Livingston Island in the South Shetland Islands, Antarctica, is named after Presian of Bulgaria.

== See also ==
- Bulgars
- History of Bulgaria
- Presian Inscription

Regnal titles
Preceded by Malamir	Khan of Bulgaria; 836–852	Succeeded by Boris I
