= Philippi =

Ancient city in eastern Macedonia, in the Edonis region

- Φίλιπποι (Ancient Greek)
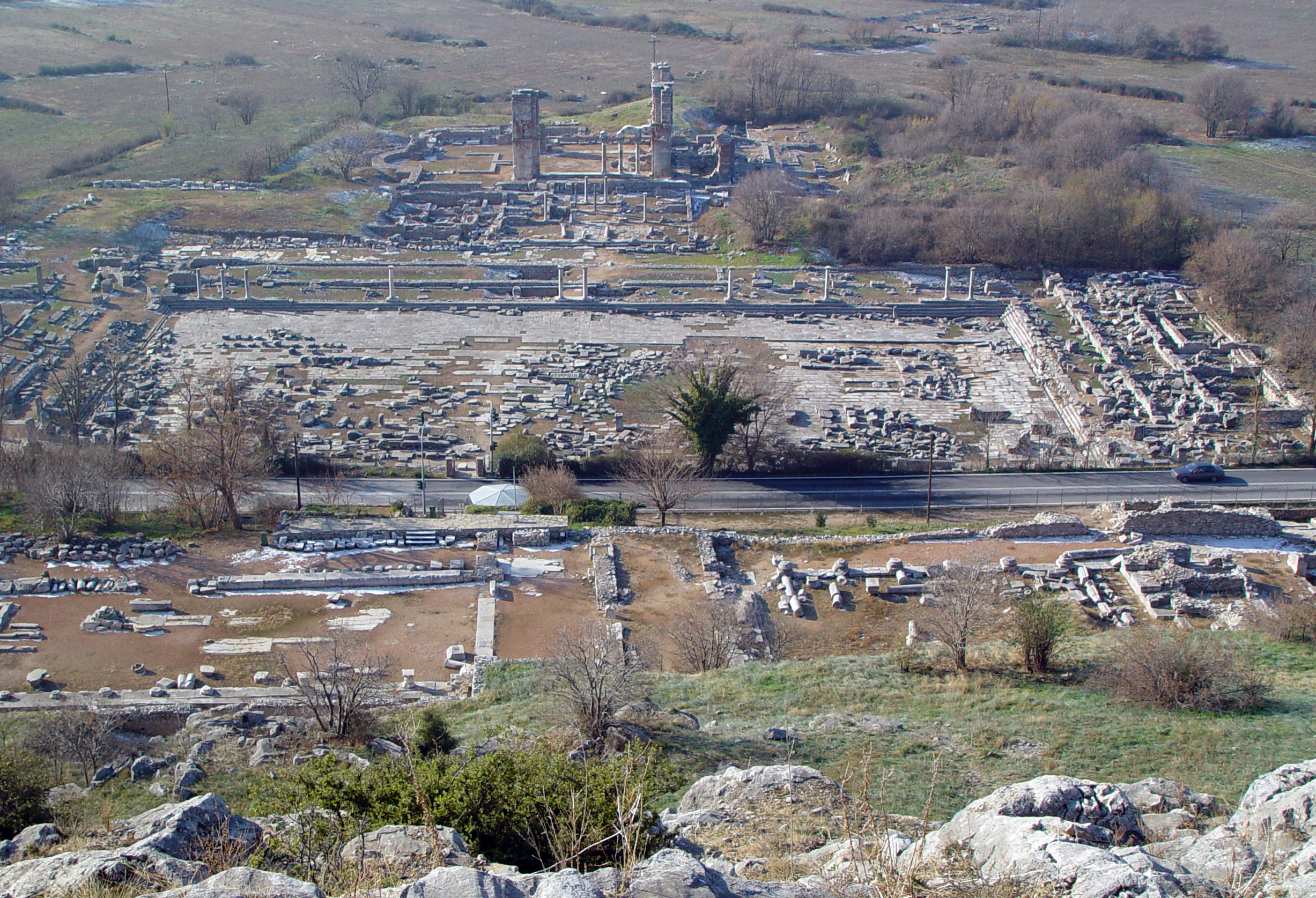
- Ruins of the centre of the city. The forum in the foreground, the market and the Basilica in the background.

- Location within Greece
- 41°00′47″N 24°17′11″E
- Type: Settlement
- Location: Filippoi, Eastern Macedonia and Thrace Greece
- Region: Macedonia

History
- Built: 356 BC
- Abandoned: 14th century

UNESCO World Heritage Site
- Official name: Archaeological Site of Philippi
- Criteria: Cultural: iii, iv
- Reference: 1517
- Inscription: 2016 (40th Session)
- Area: 87.545 ha (216.33 acres)
- Buffer zone: 176.291 ha (435.62 acres)

Philippi (/fɪˈlɪpaɪ, ˈfɪləˌpaɪ/; Ancient Greek: Φίλιπποι, Phílippoi) was a major mainland Greek city northwest of the nearby island, Thasos. Its original name was Crenides (Ancient Greek: Κρηνῖδες, Krēnĩdes "Fountains"). The city was renamed by Philip II of Macedon in 356 BC and abandoned in the 14th century after the Ottoman conquest. The present village of Filippoi is located near the ruins of the ancient city within the modern city of Kavala, in turn a part of the administrative region of East Macedonia and Thrace. The archaeological site was classified as a UNESCO World Heritage Site in 2016 because of its exceptional Roman architecture, its urban layout as a smaller reflection of Rome itself, and its importance in early Christianity. Philippi is also the place where the Battle of Philippi took place in 42 BC.

== History ==
=== Foundation ===
Thasian colonists established a settlement at Crenides in Thrace in 360/359 BC near the head of the Aegean Sea at the foot of Mount Orbelos, now called Mount Lekani, about 13 km (8.1 mi) north-west of Kavala, on the northern border of the marsh that, in antiquity, covered the entire plain separating it from the Pangaion Hills to the south. In 356 BC, King Philip II of Macedon conquered the city and renamed it to Philippi.

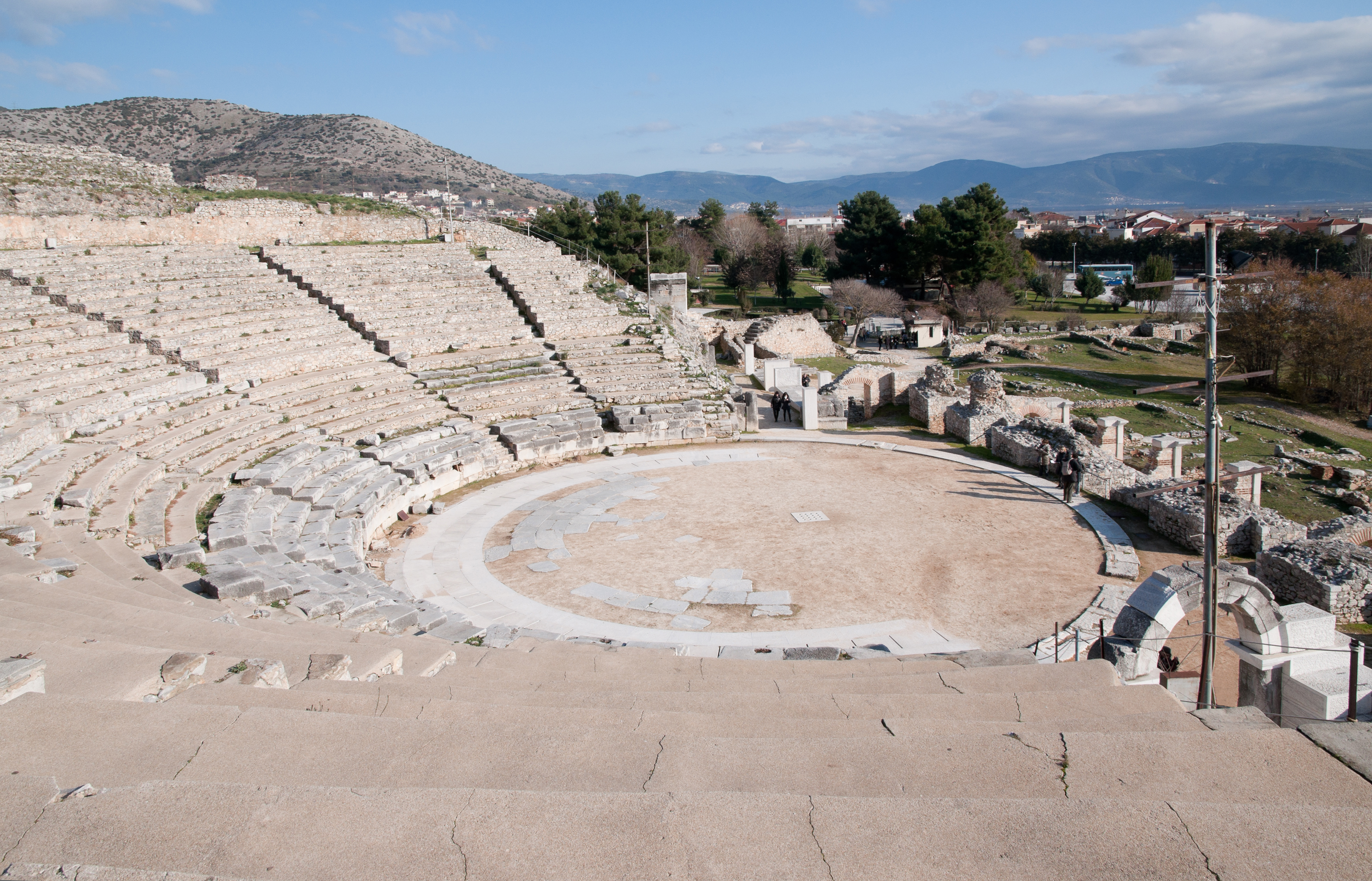
The ancient theatre

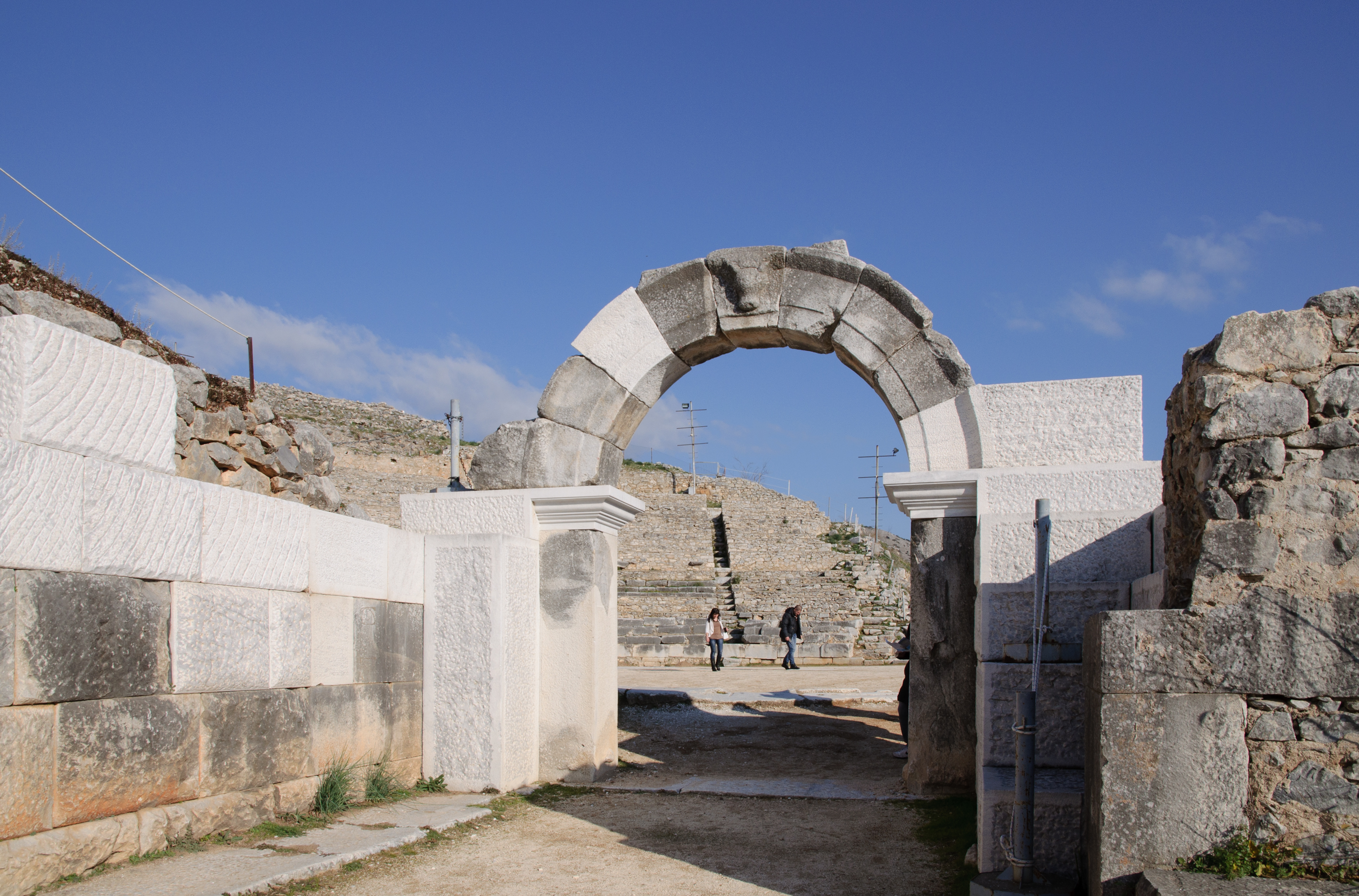
West parodos of the theatre

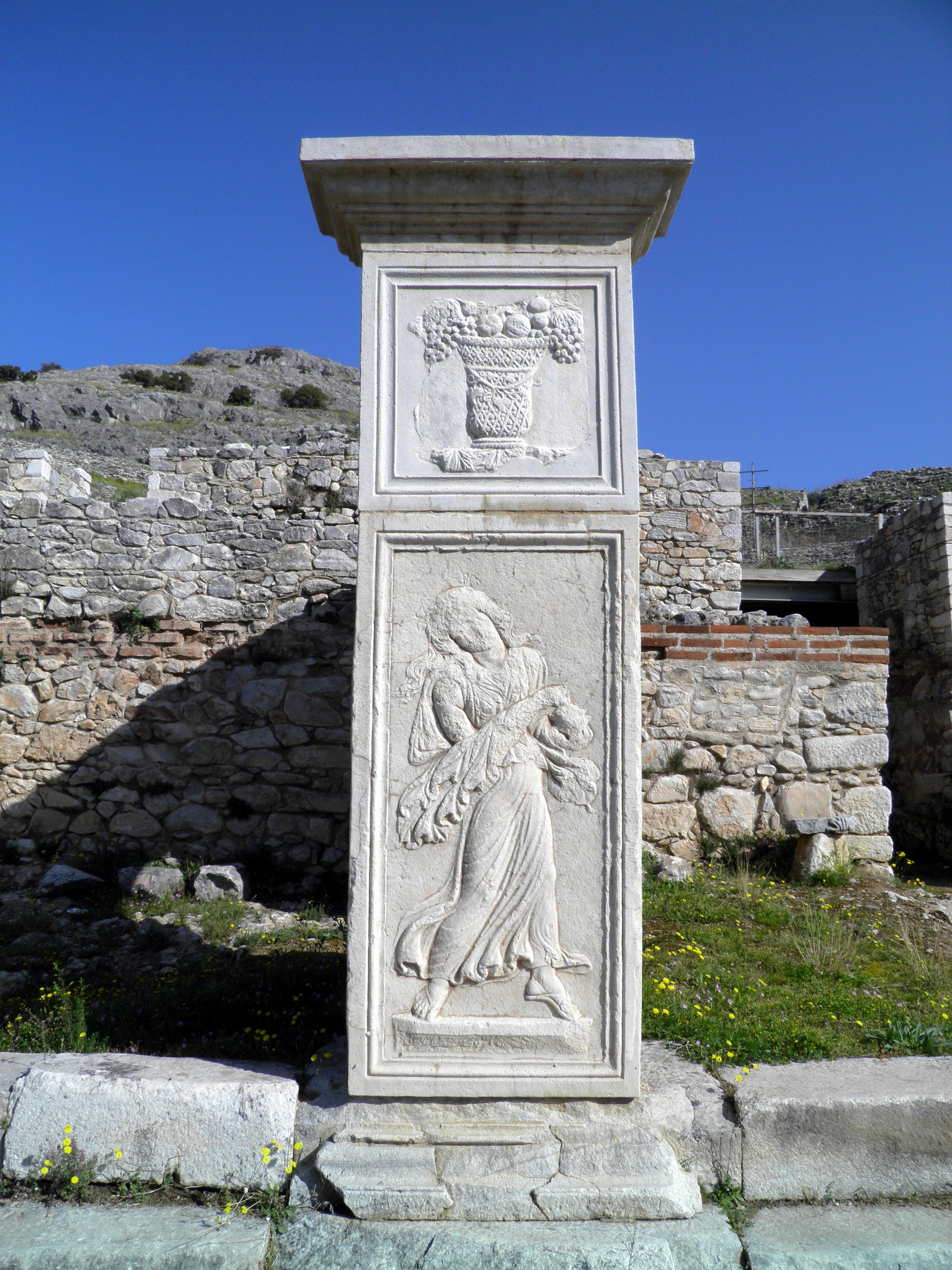
Relief decorations by Philip II (4th century BC)

The Macedonian conquerors of the town aimed to take control of the neighbouring gold mines and to establish a garrison at a strategic passage: the site controlled the route between Amphipolis and Neapolis, part of the great royal route which runs east-west across Macedonia which the Roman Republic reconstructed in the 2nd century BC as part of the Via Egnatia. Philip II endowed the city with important fortifications, which partially blocked the passage between the swamp and Mount Orbelos, and sent colonists to occupy it. Philip also had the marsh partially drained, as the writer Theophrastus (c. 371 – c. 287 BC) attests. Philippi preserved its autonomy within the kingdom of Macedon and had its own political institutions (the Assembly of the demos). The discovery of new gold mines near the city, at Asyla, contributed to the wealth of the kingdom and Philip established a mint there. The city became fully integrated into the kingdom during the last years of the reign (221 to 179 BC) of Philip V of Macedon or the reign of Perseus of Macedon.

When the Romans destroyed the Antigonid dynasty of Macedon in the Third Macedonian War (168 BC), they divided the kingdom into four separate states (merides). Amphipolis (rather than Philippi) became the capital of the eastern Macedonian state.

Almost nothing is known about the city in this period, but archeological remains include walls, the Greek theatre, the foundations of a house under the Roman forum and a little temple dedicated to a hero cult. This monument covers the tomb of a certain Exekestos, is possibly situated on the agora and is dedicated to the κτίστης (ktístēs), the foundation hero of the city.

=== Roman era ===
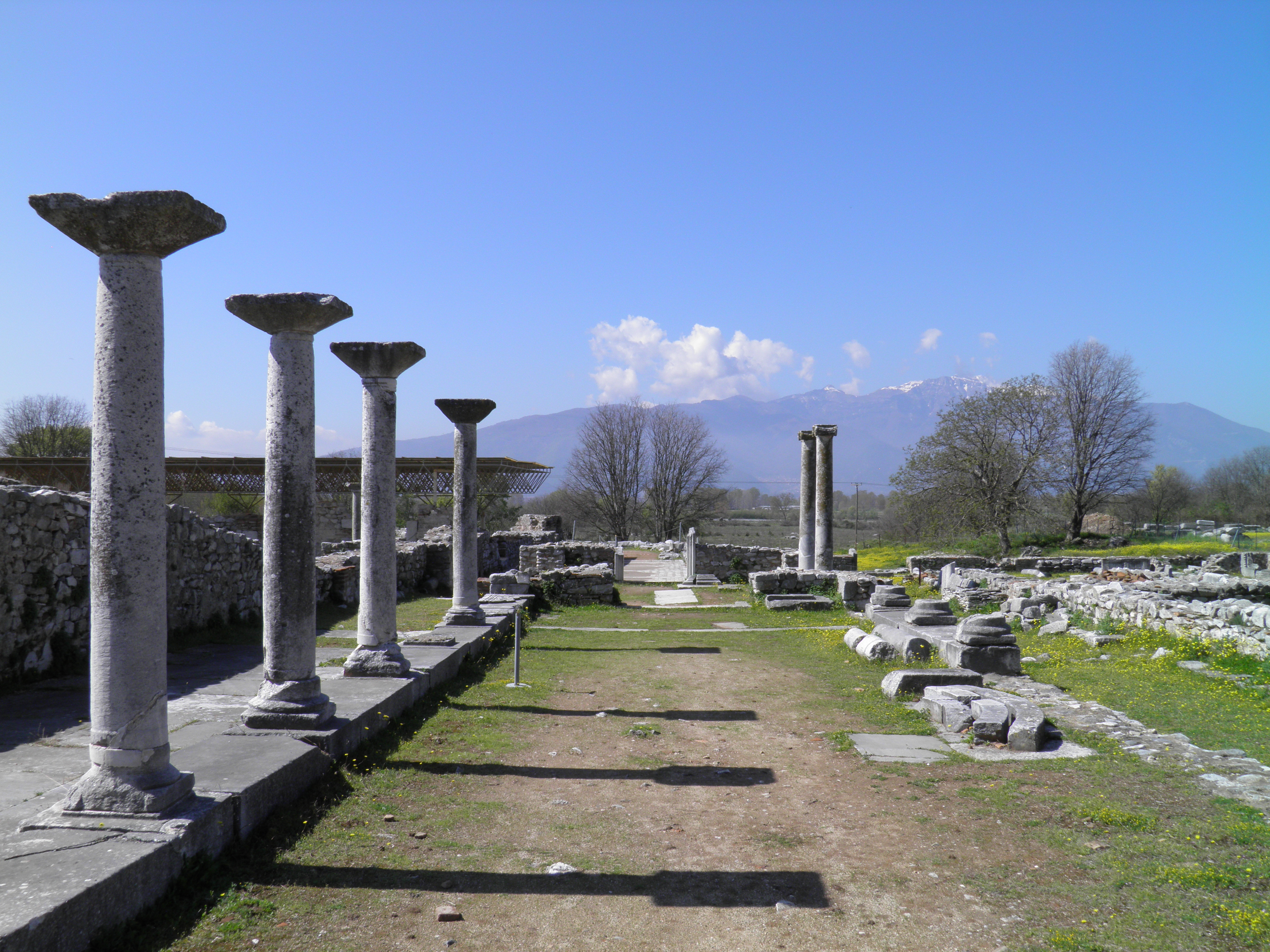
The forum

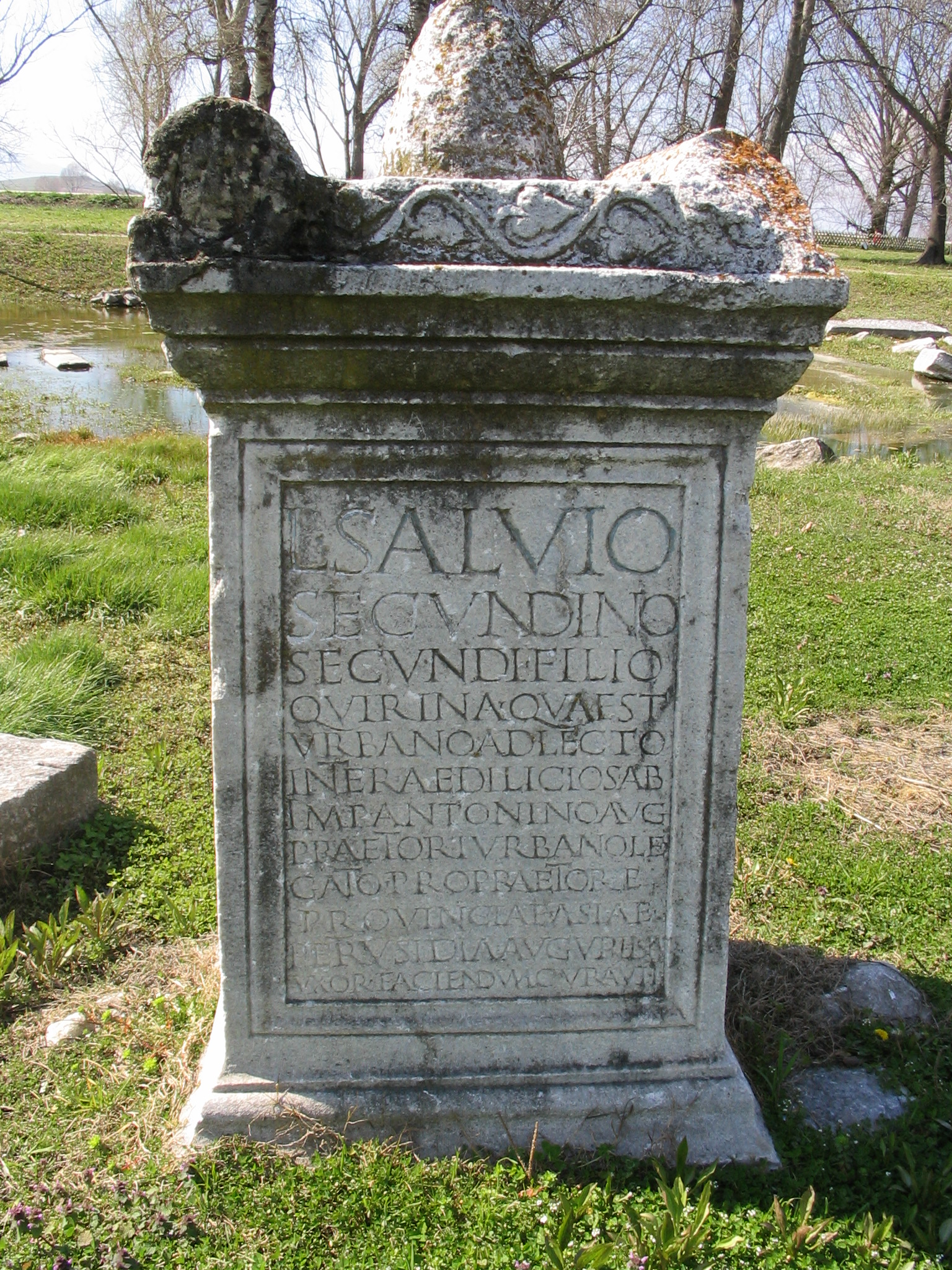
Roman grave

The city reappears in the sources during the Liberators' civil war (43–42 BC) that followed the assassination of Julius Caesar in 44 BC. Caesar's heirs Mark Antony and Octavian confronted the forces of the assassins Marcus Junius Brutus and Gaius Cassius Longinus at the Battle of Philippi on the plain to the west of the city during October in 42 BC. Antony and Octavian won this final battle against the partisans of the Republic. They released some of their veteran soldiers, probably from Legion XXVIII, to colonize the city, which was refounded as Colonia Victrix Philippensium. From 30 BC Octavian established his control of the Roman state, becoming Roman emperor from 27 BC. He reorganized the colony and established more settlers there, veterans (possibly from the Praetorian Guard) and other Italians. The city was renamed Colonia Iulia Philippensis, and then Colonia Augusta Iulia Philippensis after January, 27 BC, when Octavian received the title Augustus from the Roman Senate.

Following this second renaming, and perhaps after the first, the territory of Philippi was centuriated (divided into squares of land) and distributed to the colonists. The city kept its Macedonian walls, and its general plan was modified only partially by the construction of a forum, a little to the east of the site of Greek agora. It was a "miniature Rome", under the municipal law of Rome, and governed by two military officers, the duumviri, who were appointed directly from Rome, similar to Roman colonies.

The colony recognized its dependence on the mines that brought it its privileged position on the Via Egnatia. Many monuments evidence its wealth – particularly imposing considering the relatively small size of the urban area: the forum, laid out in two terraces on both sides of the main road, was constructed in several phases between the reigns of the Emperors Claudius (41–54 AD) and Antoninus Pius (138–161), and the theatre was enlarged and expanded to hold Roman games. An abundance of Latin inscriptions also testifies to the prosperity of the city.

=== Early Christian era ===
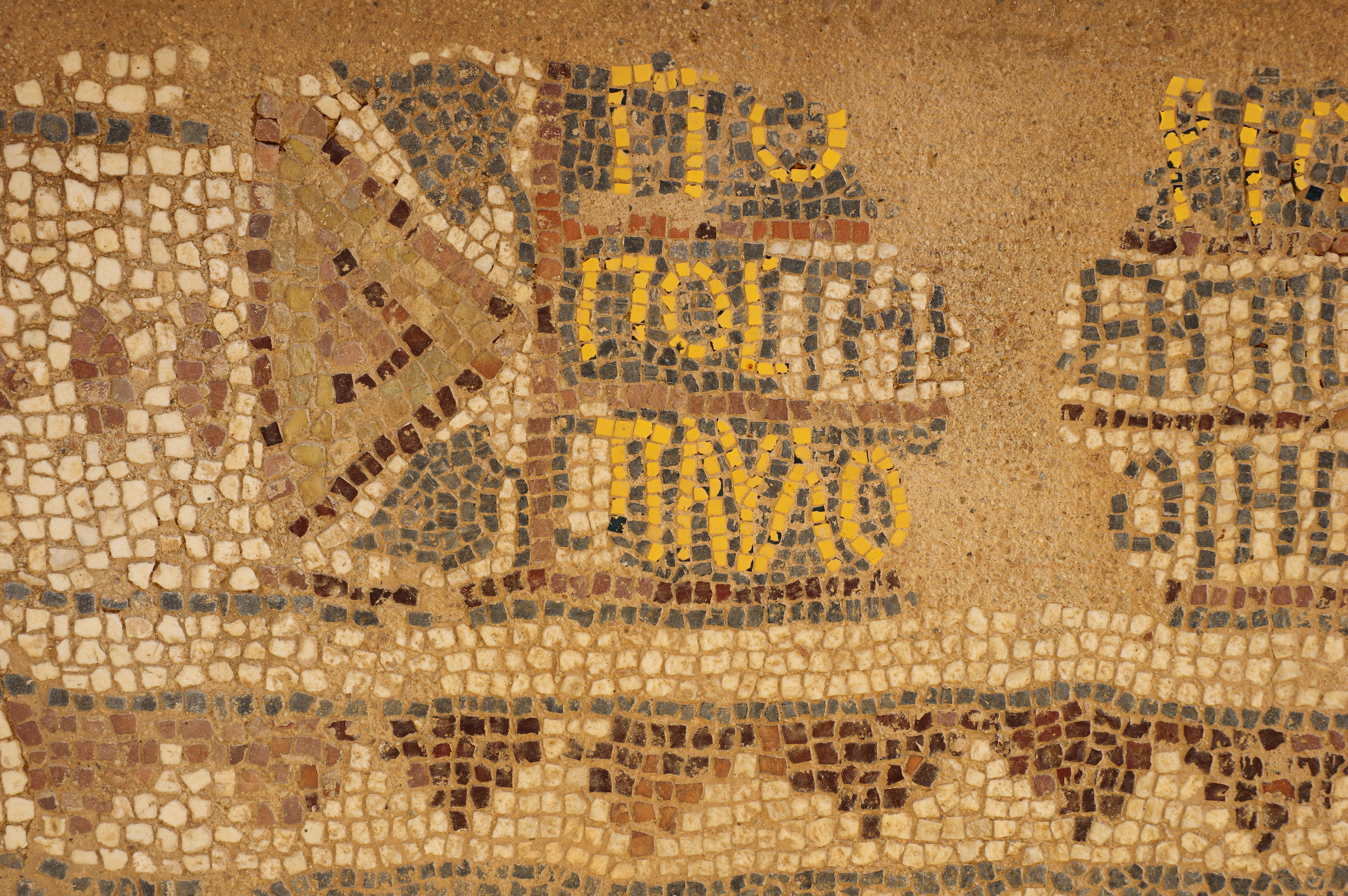
Floor mosaic with the name of St. Paul, Octagonal Basilica

The New Testament records a visit to the city by the apostle Paul during his second missionary journey (likely in AD 49 or 50). On the basis of the Acts of the Apostles and the letter to the Philippians, early Christians concluded that Paul had founded their community. Accompanied by Silas, by Timothy and possibly by Luke (the author of the Acts of the Apostles and the Gospel of Luke), Paul is believed to have preached for the first time on European soil in Philippi, leading to the conversion and baptism of the purple textile merchant, Lydia of Thyatira. According to the New Testament, Paul visited the city on two other occasions, in 56 and 57. The Epistle to the Philippians dates from around 61–62 and is generally assumed to show the immediate effects of Paul's instruction.

The development of Christianity in Philippi is indicated by a letter from Polycarp of Smyrna addressed to the community in Philippi around AD 160 and by funerary inscriptions.

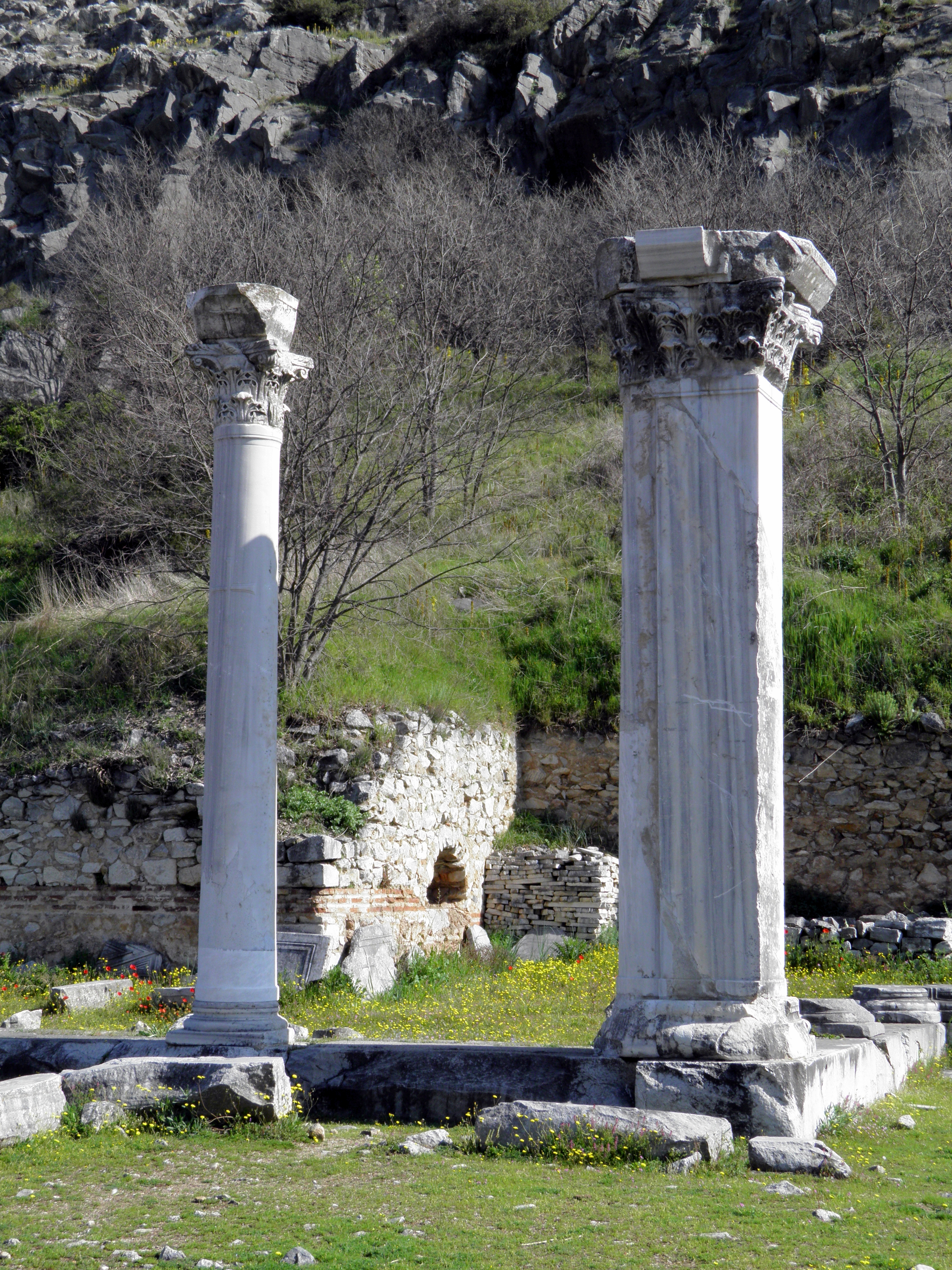
Ruins of a large, three-aisled early Christian Basilica (Basilica A), end of 5th century AD

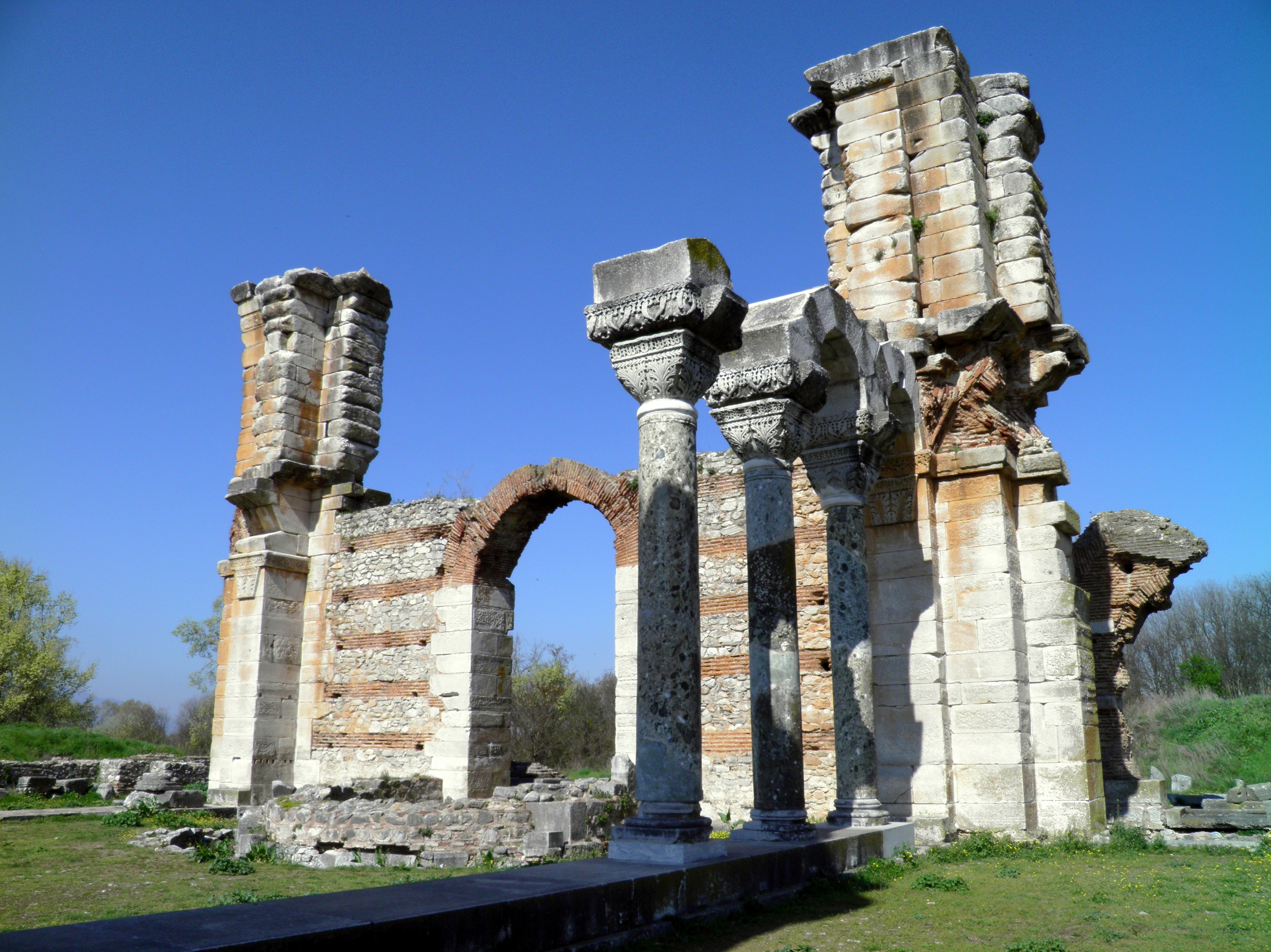
Basilica B

The first church described in the city is a small building that was probably originally a small prayer-house. This Basilica of Paul, identified by a mosaic inscription on the pavement, is dated around 343 from a mention by the bishop Porphyrios, who attended the Council of Serdica that year.

Despite Philippi having one of the oldest congregations in Europe, attestation of a bishopric dates only from the 4th century.

The prosperity of the city in the 5th and 6th centuries has been attributed by modern archaeological scholars to the growing cult of Saint Paul and his ministry. As in other major early Byzantine centers such as Thessalonica and Constantinople, many new ecclesiastical buildings were constructed at this time. Seven different churches were built in Philippi between the mid-4th century and the end of the 6th, some of which competed in size and decoration with the most beautiful buildings in Thessalonica, or with those of Constantinople. The relationship of the plan and of the architectural decoration of Basilica B with Hagia Sophia and with Saint Irene in Constantinople accorded a privileged place to this church in the history of early Christian art. The complex cathedral which took the place of the Basilica of Paul at the end of the 5th century, constructed around an octagonal church, also rivaled the churches of Constantinople.

In the same age, the Empire rebuilt the fortifications of the city to better defend against growing instability in the Balkans. In 473 Ostrogothic troops of Theodoric Strabo besieged the city; they failed to take it but burned down the surrounding villages.

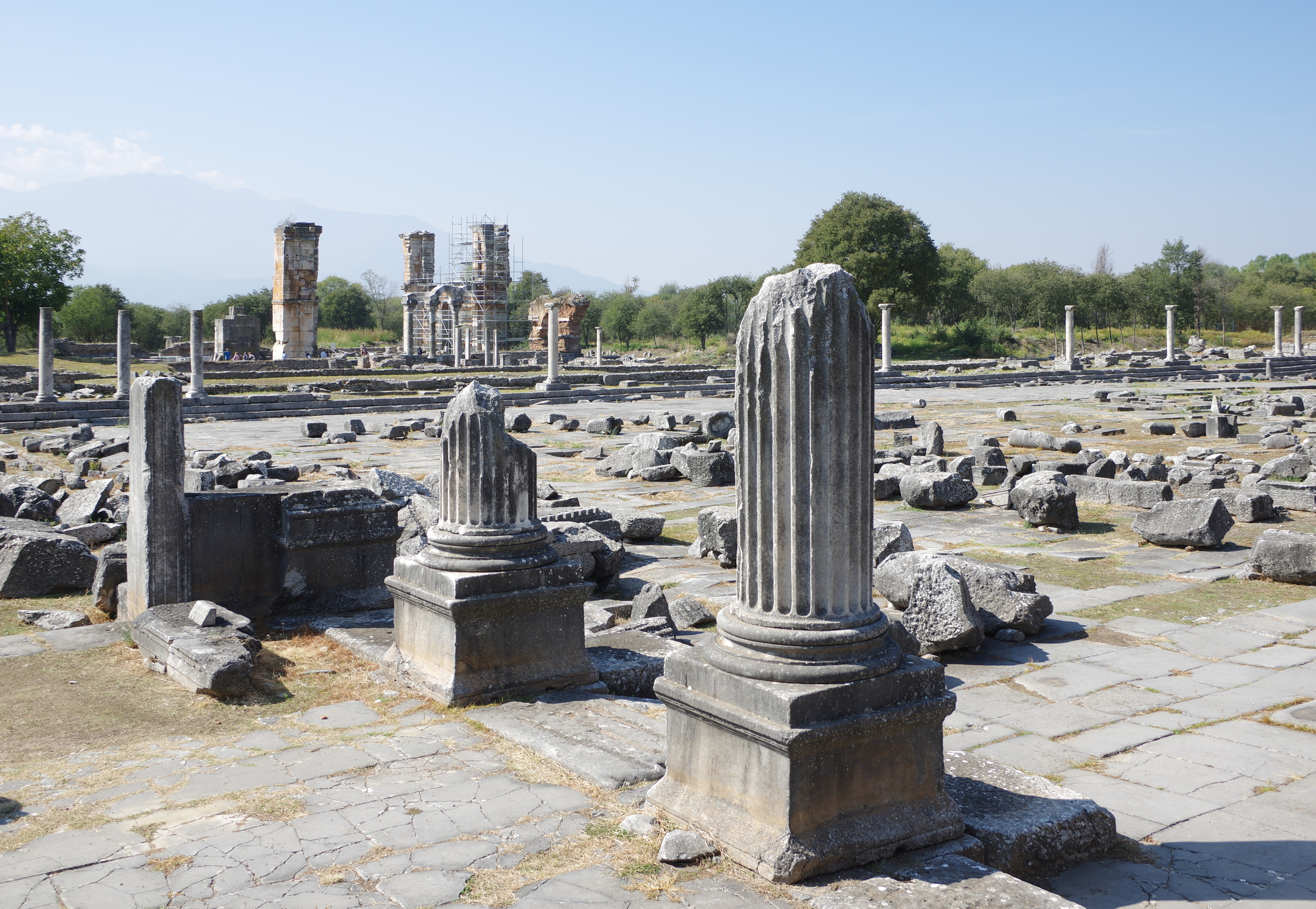
View of Philippi

=== Byzantine era and decline ===
Already weakened by the Slavic invasions at the end of the 6th century – which ruined the agrarian economy of Macedonia – and probably also by the Plague of Justinian in 547, the city was almost totally destroyed by an earthquake around 619, from which it never recovered. There was a small amount of activity there in the 7th century, but the city was now hardly more than a village.

The Byzantine Empire possibly maintained a garrison there, but in 838 the Bulgarians under kavhan Isbul took the city and celebrated their victory with a monumental inscription on the stylobate in Basilica B, now partially in ruins. The site of Philippi was so strategically sound that the Byzantines attempted to recapture it around 850. Several seals of civil servants and other Byzantine officials, dated to the first half of the 9th century, prove the presence of Byzantine armies in the city.

Around 969, Emperor Nicephorus II Phocas rebuilt the fortifications on the acropolis and in part of the city. These gradually helped to weaken Bulgar power and to strengthen the Byzantine presence in the area. In 1077 Bishop Basil Kartzimopoulos rebuilt part of the defenses inside the city. The city began to prosper once more, as witnessed by the Arab geographer Al Idrisi, who mentions it as a centre of business and wine production around 1150.

After a brief occupation by the Franks after the Fourth Crusade and the capture of Constantinople in 1204, the city was captured by the Serbs. Still, it remained a notable fortification on the route of the ancient Via Egnatia; in 1354, the pretender to the Byzantine throne, Matthew Cantacuzenus, was captured there by the Serbs.

The city was abandoned at an unknown date. When the French traveller Pierre Belon visited the area in the 1540s there remained nothing but ruins, used by the Turks as a quarry. The name of the city survived – at first in a Turkish village on the nearby plain, Philibedjik (Filibecik, "Little Filibe" in Turkish), which has since disappeared, and then in a Greek village in the mountains.

== Archaeological excavation of the site ==
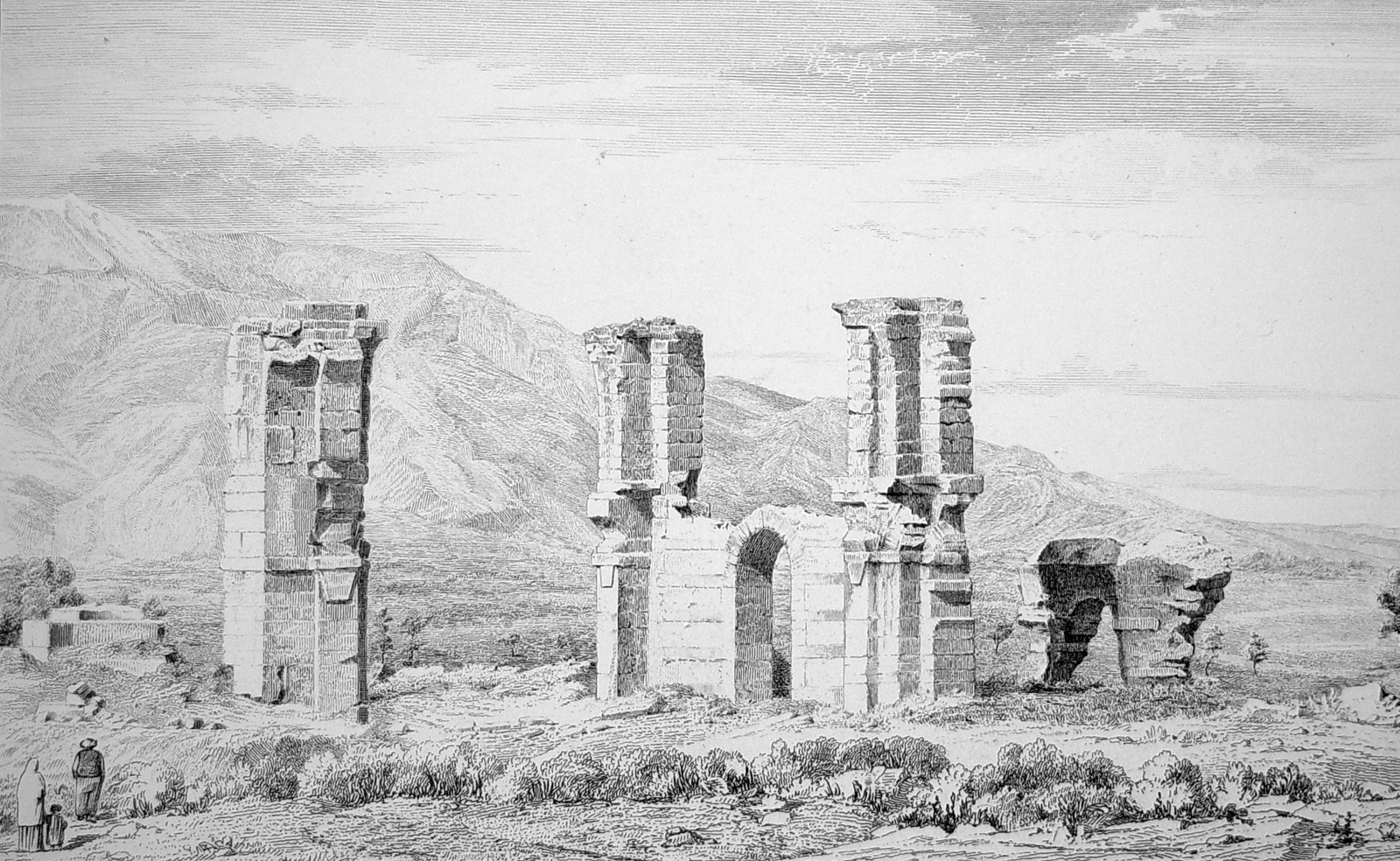
The ruins of Direkler (Basilica B), drawn by H. Daumet in 1861

Although the site was briefly noted by earlier travellers, the first modern archaeological description, based on a visit in 1856, was published in 1860 by Georges Perrot. This was followed by the more extensive investigations of the French Mission Archéologique de Macédoine in 1861, led by the archaeologist Léon Heuzey and the architect Honoré Daumet. Excavations by the École française d'Athènes began in the summer of 1914, were renewed in 1920 after an interruption caused by the First World War, and continued until 1937. During this time the Greek theatre, the forum, Basilicas A and B, the baths, and the walls were excavated. After the Second World War, Greek archaeologists returned to the site. From 1958 to 1978, the Archaeological Society of Athens, followed by the Greek Archaeological Service and the University of Thessalonica, uncovered the bishop's quarter and the octagonal church, large private residences, a new basilica near the Museum, and two others in the necropolis east of the city.

== See also ==
- Decree of Philippi, 242 BCE
- List of ancient Greek cities
- Macedon
