= Enravota =

Enravota Енравота
- Born: early 9th century
- Died: c. 833
- Venerated in: Bulgaria, the Eastern Orthodox world
- Feast: 28 March

Saint Enravota (Bulgarian: Свети Енравота) or Voin (Воин, "warrior") or Boyan (Боян) was the eldest son of Omurtag of Bulgaria and the first Bulgarian Christian martyr, as well as the earliest Bulgarian saint to be canonized.

Born in the early 9th century, Enravota was the elder brother of Malamir of Bulgaria, who succeeded their father Omurtag to the Bulgarian throne in 831. Enravota was possibly deprived of the throne because he favoured Christianity, which the boyars feared might endanger the court. Not long after the death of Omurtag, Enravota asked his brother to release a pious Byzantine captive who had been imprisoned by Omurtag. The captive's sermons persuaded Enravota to convert to Christianity and be baptized.

Once informed of his brother's deeds, Malamir attempted to make him renounce Christianity, but did not succeed. Enravota was killed on the order of Malamir, around 833. 11th-century chronicler Theophylact of Bulgaria claimed he delivered the following prophetic speech before his death:

This faith, which I now die for, will spread and increase across the whole Bulgarian land, although you may wish to oppress it with my death. In any case, the Sign of Christ will establish itself and churches of God will be built everywhere and pure priests will serve the pure God and will deliver "sacrifice of praise and confession" to the invigorating Trinity. Idols, and priests as well, and their ungodly temples, will crumble and will turn into nothing, as if they had not existed. Besides, you alone (to Malamir), after many years, will cast away your ungodly soul without receiving anything in reward for your cruelty.

In the Bulgarian Orthodox Church, Enravota's feast day is 28 March.

== Honours ==
Enravota Glacier on Nordenskjöld Coast in Graham Land, Antarctica is named after St. Enravota.
