= Dennis P. Hupchick =

American historian

- Born: Dennis Paul Hupchick; September 3, 1948 (age 77); Monongahela, Pennsylvania, United States
- Education: University of Pittsburgh
- Occupation: Historian

Dennis P. Hupchick is Professor of History, emeritus at Wilkes University, Pennsylvania.

== Biography ==
Hupchick was born on September 3, 1948, in Monongahela, Pennsylvania. He is a son of a steelworker and a homemaker of Slovak and Hungarian ancestry. Hupchick graduated history from the University of Pittsburgh. His doctoral dissertation's topic is "Bulgarians in the seventeenth century (1983)." He wrote it under the supervision of Prof. James Franklin Clarke Jr. (1906–1982). Clarke was the recognized doyen of Bulgarian historical writings in America. Later he has directed the East European and Russian Studies Program at Wilkes University. Dennis P. Hupchick is author of numerous articles on Bulgarian and Balkan history. He is a member of the American Association Advancement of Slavic Studies. He has also edited a number of scholarly books. Hupchick was the past-president of the Bulgarian Studies Association in the US and was a Fulbright Scholar to Bulgaria in 1989. He is the author of "Conflict and Chaos in Eastern Europe, "Culture and History in Eastern Europe", "The Balkans, and The Bulgarians in the Seventeenth Century", also co-author of "The Palgrave Concise Historical Atlas of Eastern Europe". Hupchick has edited a number of scholarly books and has authored numerous articles on Bulgarian and Balkan history.

== Works ==
- The Bulgarians in the Seventeenth Century: Slavic Orthodox Society and Culture under Ottoman Rule (1993)
- Culture and History in Eastern Europe, St. Martin's Press (1994)
- Conflict and Chaos in Eastern Europe, St. Martin's Press (1995)
- A Concise Historical Atlas of Eastern Europe, St. Martin's Press (1996)
- The Balkans: From Constantinople to Communism, St. Martin's Press (2001)
- The Palgrave Concise Historical Atlas of Eastern Europe, Palgrave (2001)
- The Palgrave Concise Historical Atlas of the Balkans, Palgrave (2001)
- The Balkans: From Constantinople to Communism, Palgrave (2004)
