= Byzantine–Bulgarian treaty of 815 =

815 treaty between Bulgaria and the Byzantine Empire

The Treaty of 815 (Bulgarian: Договор от 815) was a 30-year peace agreement signed in Constantinople between the Bulgarian Khan Omurtag and the Byzantine Emperor Leo V the Armenian.

== Background ==
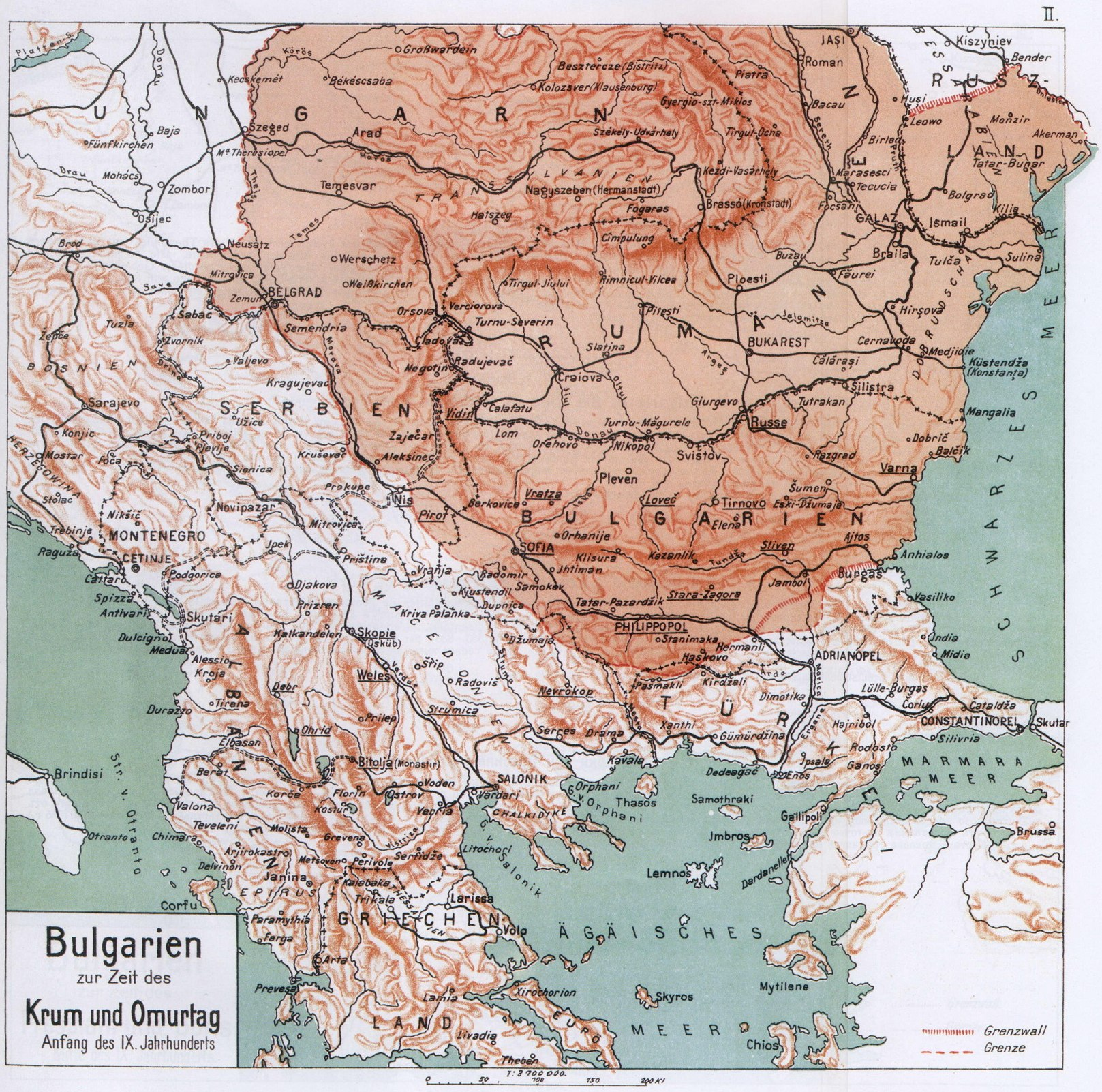
Territory of the First Bulgarian Empire in the early 9th century.

With the succession of Khan Krum on the Bulgarian throne in 803 began the last and decisive part of the prolonged succession of Byzantine–Bulgarian conflicts which started in 756. For a little over a decade until his death in 814, Krum achieved significant successes over the Byzantine Empire, seizing the important city of Serdica in 809 and decisively defeating the Byzantine armies at the Varbitsa pass and at Versinikia. His son and successor Omurtag tried to continue Krum's aggressive policy but his campaign in 814 was stopped by the Byzantines. As both countries were exhausted by the sustained military effort, peace negotiations began.

== Signing of the treaty ==
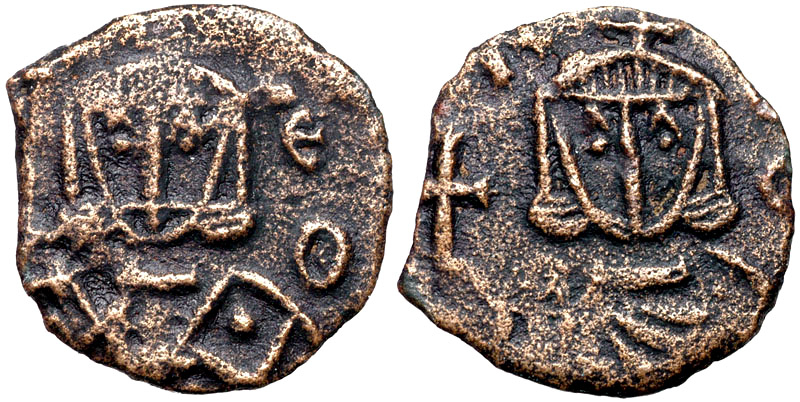
Leo V the Armenian.

In the beginning of 815 Omurtag sent emissaries to Constantinople to negotiate the peace. The signing ceremony was a solemn event and performed in the presence of numerous people. The agreement envisaged that the Byzantine Emperor must vow according to the pagan Bulgarian customs and Omurtag's emissaries according to the Christian laws. The Byzantine historians were outraged by the emperor's actions. They recorded that the "most Christian" ruler had to pour out water on the ground from a cup, to personally turn round horse saddles, to touch triple bridle and to lift grass high above the ground. Another historian added that Leo V had to even cut up dogs as witnesses to his vow.

== Terms ==
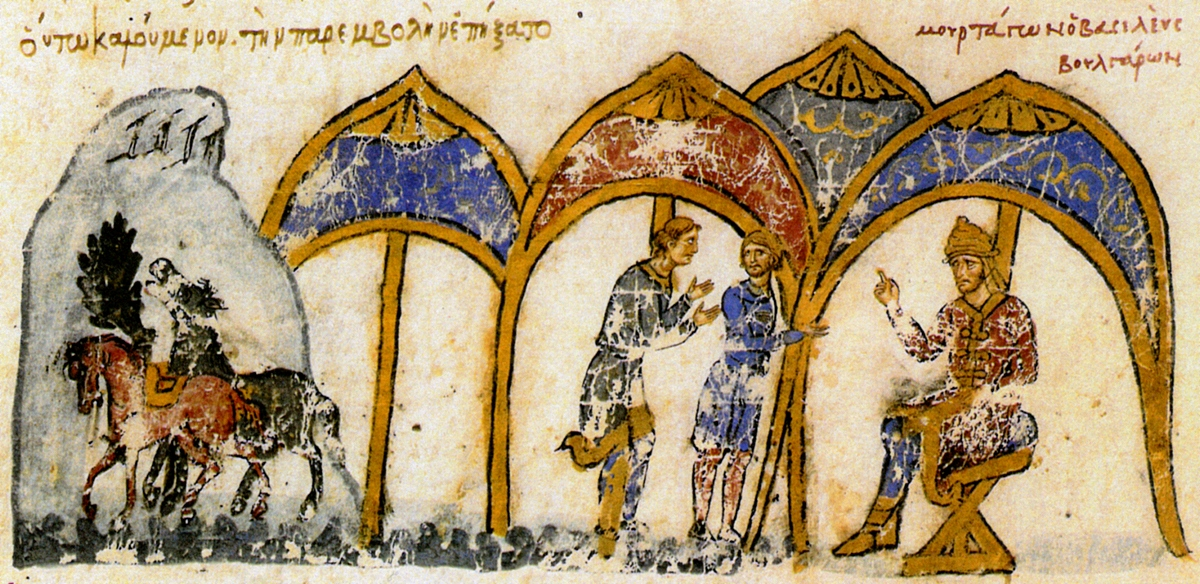
The Bulgarian ruler Omurtag sends delegation to the Byzantine emperor.

Byzantine records for the conditions of the treaty have not been preserved, but the first two of the treaty's four articles survive in the Greek-language Syuleymankyoy Inscription:

- 1st Article, determining the border between Bulgaria and Byzantium. It started at Debelt near the Black Sea coast and passed along the old trench of Erkesiya up to the upper stream of the river Choban Azmak, a tributary of Tundzha. From there it reached the Maritsa river to the north of Harmanli, near the ancient town of Constantia and continued to the west to the modern village of Uzundzhovo. After that the border continued to an unidentified mountain, most probably one of the ridges of the eastern Rhodope Mountains. According to the Süleymanköy Inscription, the border was ratified to that mountain. The explanation of the historians is that the region of Philippopolis (Plovdiv) was to be transferred to Bulgaria after some years while the Byzantine garrisons gradually withdrew from the area; until that time the borderline followed the old border up to Sredna Gora. The Bulgarians kept some fortresses around Adrianople as a guarantee for the cession of Philippopolis, which were returned to the Byzantine Empire after Khan Malamir (831–836) took possession of the city. With that article the expansion of the Bulgarian borders to the south was officially recognized although the Bulgarians had to return some of the occupied towns, notably Adrianople.

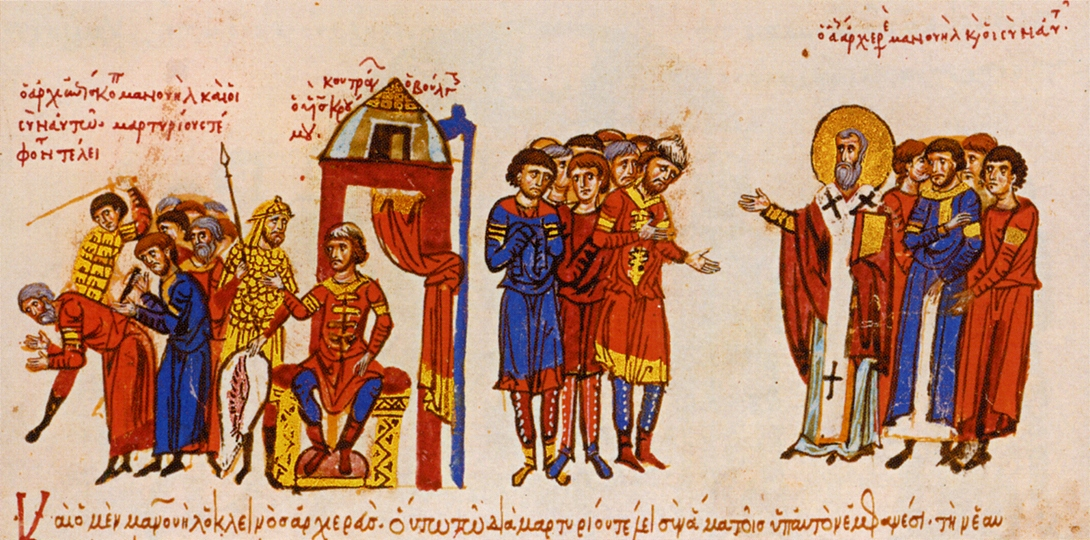
Khan Omurtag.

- 2nd Article, concerning the exchange of prisoners of war between the two countries. The Bulgarians agreed to release the Byzantines captured during the disastrous campaign of Emperor Nikephoros I in 811, as well as the population captured during the later raids of Krum. The Byzantines had to release the Slavs who had been captured by Leo V, as well as those who inhabited border regions of the Byzantine Empire around Strandzha and the Rhodope, even though some of them had never been subjects of the Bulgarian khans. The article then continued with details for the process of exchange. Notably, the Byzantines not only had to agree to exchange man for man, but also to give two heads of cattle for every released Byzantine soldier, on the condition that their soldiers would return in their homes. In that way the Bulgarians ensured the reduction of the Byzantine border garrisons.

== Aftermath ==
Although the treaty was in Bulgaria's favour, it was a welcome respite by the Byzantines, who had to regroup their forces after successive defeats, and who faced another round of internal turmoil because of the revival of iconoclasm. Bulgaria on the other hand also faced religious problems, as the growing number of Christians disturbed Omurtag: the Khan began anti-Christian persecutions, to which his eldest son Enravota also fell victim. The Bulgarians also had to restore their economy following the bloody conflicts of the first decade of the century, while their capital Pliska still lay in ruins.

The peace treaty was reaffirmed in 820, when Emperor Michael II seized the Byzantine throne. Omurtag and Michael II additionally agreed to provide help to each other in case of danger. True to his word, in 823 Omurtag relieved the siege of Constantinople by the rebel Thomas the Slav and defeated his army.
