= Kavkhan =

Commander-in-chief of the First Bulgarian Empire

The kavkhan (Note: Also transliterated as kaukhan; according to some historians, such as V. Beshevliev, it should be read as kapkhan (from qapghan, lit. 'conqueror').) (Medieval Greek: καυχάνος; (Note: Most often recorded as καυχάνος, but καυκάνος, καπχάνης, κοπχάνων are also attested.)) was one of the most important officials in the First Bulgarian Empire.

== Role and status ==
According to the generally accepted opinion, he was the second most important person in the state after the Bulgarian ruler. He had a number of responsibilities and concentrated huge power and authority. The kavkhan was a commander-in-chief of the Bulgarian army and one of the primary diplomats in the state. He was a member of the 'Bolyar Counsel' and one of the most important advisers to the Bulgarian ruler; the kavkhan was sometimes his regent or co-ruler. The kavkhan was a high magistrate and substitute to the ruler when the latter is absent from the capital. He is also attributed to have been a judge.

It is assumed that there was a prominent bolyar family in Bulgaria from which the kavkhan was chosen generation after generation - the so-called "kavkhan kin". The title was therefore hereditary and for life. According to most historians the title outlived the First Empire which was conquered by Basil II in 1018. The last person who had the prerogatives and responsibilities of a kavkhan was Georgi Voiteh, an initiator of the uprising of Peter III (Constantine Bodin) in 1072.

== History ==
During the reign of Samuil the kavkhan was Dometian, captured by the Byzantines and succeeded by his brother Teodor during the reign of Ivan Vladislav. During the Second Bulgarian Empire the title was not used.

Another famous kavkhan is Peter who carried out three missions in Rome and one in Constantinople during the reign of Boris I. The most prominent kavkhan, as well as the one with most merits for Bulgaria was Isbul. He occupied that position during the reign of three Khans: Omurtag (814-831), Malamir (831-836) and his nephew Presian (836-852). His merits include the reconstruction of Pliska as a beautiful capital during Omurtag and the completion of the new centralized state administration. He ordered an action to catch the Byzantine spies. He was among the main initiators of the 30-year peace Treaty of 815 which was very favourable and useful for Bulgaria. Isbul commanded the Bulgarian armies in successful campaigns against the Byzantines in southern Macedonia.

== See also ==
- Ichirgu-boila
- Qapghan Qaghan
- Qaghan
