= Battle of Marcellae =

792 battle of the Byzantine–Bulgarian Wars

Coordinates: 42°38′15″N 26°53′47″E

- Part of the Byzantine–Bulgarian wars
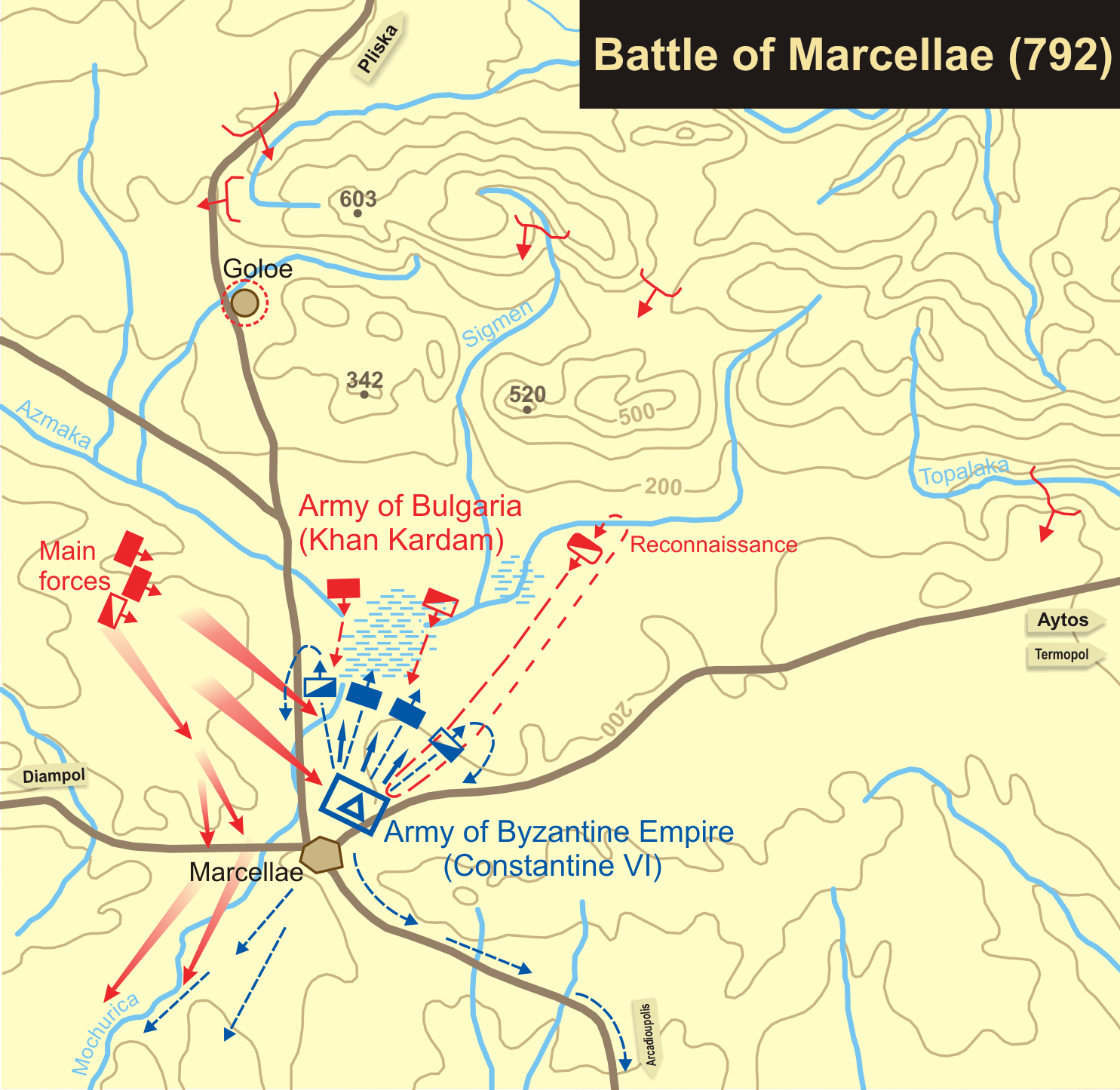
Date	20 July 792
Location	Markeli, near Karnobat, Bulgaria
Result	Bulgarian victory

Belligerents
Bulgarian Empire	Byzantine Empire

Commanders and leaders
Kardam	Constantine VI; Michael Lachanodrakon †

Strength
Unknown	Unknown

Casualties and losses
Unknown	Heavy

The Battle of Marcellae (Bulgarian: Битката при Маркели; Greek: Μάχη των Μαρκελλών) was fought on the 20 July 792 between the forces of the Byzantine Empire, led by Constantine VI, and those of the First Bulgarian Empire under Kardam. The Byzantines were routed and forced to retreat to Constantinople. Fighting took place at Marcellae (Markeli), near the modern town of Karnobat in southeastern Bulgaria, the same site as an earlier battle in 756.

== Prelude ==
In the last quarter of the 8th century Bulgaria overcame the internal political crisis that followed the end of the rule of the Dulo. The khans Telerig and Kardam managed to consolidate the central authority and put an end of the quarrels among the nobility. The Bulgarians finally had the opportunity to intensify their campaigns in Slavic-populated Macedonia. In 789 they penetrated deep into the valley of the Struma river and heavily defeated the Byzantines, killing the strategos of Thrace Filites. In order to distract the Bulgarian attention from Macedonia, the Byzantine emperor Constantine VI started a campaign in northern Thrace in April 791. The armies met near the fortress of Provat (20 km east of Odrin) and the Byzantines were forced to retreat, but their defeat was not decisive and in the following year the campaign was renewed.

== Battle ==
In the summer of the next year Constantine VI led his army north and on 20 July was confronted by the Bulgarians under Kardam near the border castle Marcellae. The Bulgarians had built ramparts blocking the roads to the Rish Pass and the capital Pliska. For several days the emperor did not dare to attack but by the end of July he was convinced by "false astrologists" (according to the Byzantine chronicler Theophanes the Confessor) that the stars boded victory and attacked. Before the beginning of the battle, while awaiting the Byzantine assault, the Bulgarian ruler secretly placed part of his cavalry behind the hills surrounding the battlefield.

Due to the rugged terrain the advancing Byzantine army broke its order. Taking advantage of that mistake, Kardam ordered a counterattack which brought the Bulgarians a great success. The Bulgarian cavalry went round the Byzantines and cut their way back to their fortified camp and the fortress of Marcellae. The Bulgarians took the supplies, the treasury and the tent of the emperor. They chased Constantine VI to Constantinople, killing a great number of soldiers. Many Byzantine commanders and officers perished in the battle, including the sword of the Isaurian dynasty in a certain Michael Lachanodrakon.

During the battle the Bulgarians used the arkani, a long pole with an attachment similar to a lasso at one end. It could be used to pull riders out of the saddle, and was consequently an excellent weapon against cavalry.

== Aftermath ==
After the defeat, Constantine VI had to conclude peace with Kardam and had to pay tribute. Four years later the emperor stopped the payment, leading to a new war in Thrace which ended without a decisive battle. The hostilities between Bulgaria and Byzantium continued under Kardam's successor Krum.

The victory had great political significance. The decades of crisis in Bulgaria were finally overcome. Bulgaria entered the 9th century consolidated, stronger and united which was an important factor for the string of victories scored by Krum against the Byzantines.

== Sources ==
- Andreev, Jordan; Milcho Lalkov (1996). The Bulgarian Khans and Tsars (in Bulgarian). Veliko Tarnovo: Abagar. ISBN 954-427-216-X.
- Confessor, Theophanes. Chronographia – Greek Sources for Bulgarian History (GIBI), volume III (in Bulgarian).
- Peychev, Atanas (1984). 1300 Year on Guard (in Bulgarian). Sofia: Voenno izdatelstvo.
- Shikanov, V. N. (2006). Byzantium. Eagle and Lion: Bulgarian-Byzantine Wars 7th–13th centuries (in Russian). Sankt Peterburg: Shaton. ISBN 5-94988-022-6.
- Zhekov, Zh. (2004). Military Tactics of the Bulgarians 7th–9th centuries (in Bulgarian). Voenno izdatelstvo. Archived from the original on April 25, 2009.
- Zlatarski, Vasil (1971) [1927]. "Part I. Period of Hunnic-Bulgarian Domination (679–852). VI. Foundation and Consolidation of the Bulgarian State". History of the Bulgarian state in the Middle Ages. Volume I. History of the First Bulgarian Empire (in Bulgarian) (2nd ed.). Sofia: Nauka i izkustvo. OCLC 67080314.
