= Dukum =

Probable Khan of Bulgaria

- Khan of Bulgaria (?)
- Reign: 814 (?)
- Predecessor: Krum
- Successor: Ditzeng (?)
- Born: 8th-century
- Died: 814
- House: Krum dynasty

Dukum (Bulgarian: Дукум) was probably a brother of the Bulgarian khan Krum (r. 803–814), who might have succeeded Krum as the ruler of Bulgaria for a few weeks or months. After him, the throne was taken by Ditzeng, who died shortly under unclear circumstances. At the end of 814 or early 815 Krum's son Omurtag ascended the throne, thus ending the succession crisis. The circumstances of Dukum's death are unknown and no hypothesis can be ruled out, including a possible involvement of Omurtag himself.

The prevailing scientific thesis had long been that Krum was succeeded directly by Omurtag. Initially, in the 19th and early 20th centuries, a number of scholars, including academician Konstantin Jireček, believed the opposite that, albeit briefly, two or even three monarchs reigned between Krum and Omurtag. According Steven Runciman these may had been only the leaders of rebel factions that for a short while controlled the government at Pliska. Ultimately, the view prevailed that these were military leaders, mistakenly perceived by medieval Byzantine authors as rulers of Bulgaria. An inscription of Omurtag's son and successor Malamir mentioned only Krum and Omurtag.

Analyzing the scarce information in historical sources, historian Veselin Beshevliev once again revived the hypothesis of the "interim" rulers Dukum and Ditzeng. It was adopted and further developed by Plamen Pavlov in his book The Dynasty of Krum (2019):

"Although dated to a later period, the sources that tell of Krum's heirs, such as the Menologion of Basil II, are connected with the Patriarchate of Constantinople and the Byzantine imperial chancellery. It seems that Krum had only one brother, perhaps even older than himself (?), and this was almost certainly Dukum. His military merits were highlighted by Krum himself in the contemporary Malamirovo inscription. In turn, the chronicler Theophanes the Confessor mentioned Krum's brother as his first associate in the wars with Byzantium. Unfortunately, the name of this mysterious brother was not mentioned, as it was obviously widely known. " […] "Given that Krum died unexpectedly at the age of about 35–40, when his son Omurtag was still very young, it is understandable that the ruler's brother, a man with solid political and military experience, had come to power. Indeed, it is possible that Dukum was a regent and co-ruler of Omurtag, but supreme power was in his hands. Fate was not kind to Dukum, who reigned for no more than a month or two and died unexpectedly."

If Dukum had been the brother of khan Krum mentioned in the inscriptions, he was in command of the center of the Bulgarian army in the campaigns of 813 and must have participated in the battle of Versinikia against the forces of the Byzantine emperor Michael I Rangabe. In the aftermath of the Bulgarian victory, he was put in charge of the siege of Adrianople, while Krum himself led a push to the Byzantine capital Constantinople. The city was eventually captured, when Krum joined his forces with his brother a few weeks later.
