= Malamirovo inscription =

Malamirovo or Hambarli Inscription is a Bulgarian Greek inscription of around 813 AD, commemorating Bulgarian victories of Krum over the Byzantines, now preserved in the Varna Archaeological Museum.

== Text ==
[ο Κρουμος ο] [ά]- ρχον ??ΒΗΝΝΟ. ε- ξήλθεν ης (Κονσταν)ηνόπο- (λη)ν (με τον λαόν) αυτού.

[κ]ε ο αδελφός αυ- [τ]ού ουκ εληθάρ- [γ]ησεν αυτόν κε εξήλ- [θ]εν κε έδοκε[ν] αυτόν ο θεό- ς κε τόπ[ου]ς κ[ε] κάσστρα ερ- ήμοσεν [τ]άδε <?Ε> την Σερδη- κήν, την<ν> Δεβελ- τόν, την Κονστα- ντήαν, την (Βερσ)ηνι- κίαν, Αδρηαν[ού]- πολην. Το?ύτα (ερυμνά) τα κάστρα [έ]λαβε- ν. τα δε λυπά κ[άσ]- τρα έδοκεν ο θε[ό]ς φόβον κε ά[φ]ηκ- [α]ν κε έφυγαν κ- ε ο κά[τ]ου τόπος (ουκ) λ- ηθάργησεν τον τό- πον τούτον, <τ> όπου ε[ξ]ή- λθε(ν με) τον όλον λαόν κε έκ(α)ψ(εν τα) χορήα ημόν<ν> α[υ]- τό(ς) ο γέρον ο βασηλεύ[ς] ο φαρακλός [κ]ε επήρεν όλα κε τους όρκους ε- λησμόνησεν κε εξ- [ή]λθεν επή (αυτόν) ο άρχον <ο ά> ο Κρο[υ]μος προς [τ]ο πολ(εμήσε) [κε τον βασ]ηλέ[α] ε[νίκησεν? εφόνευσεν?] ΟΝ?Ε .. κε απήλθεν ήνα ...... [κ]ε ερήμ(ο)σα την

=== Translation ===
[Archon Krum came forward to Constantinople with his people]. And his brother took care of him and went forth, and God gave Krum power to devastate places and castles: Serdica, Debeltos, Constantia, Versinikia, Adrianopolis. These fenced castles he conquered. The other fortresses, God gave them fear and they fled. Moreover, he did not forget the lower land, when the old and bald king (Nikephoros I?) came out with all his people, and burnt our villages, forgetting his oaths. And Archon Krum went forth against him, to make war on him, and he has [defeated? and killed?] the king, ... and he left to ... and I have laid to waste the (Lower Land).

== See also ==
- Krum
- Nikephoros I Logothetes
- Battle of Versinikia 813 AD
