= Siege of Adrianople (813) =

Bulgarian siege of Byzantine Adrianople

- Part of the Byzantine–Bulgarian wars
Date	813
Location	Adrianople 41.6769°N 26.5556°E
Result	Bulgarian victory

Belligerents
Bulgarian Empire	Byzantine Empire

Commanders and leaders
Krum; Dukum	Unknown

Strength
Unknown	Unknown

Casualties and losses
Unknown	Heavy; 10,000 captured

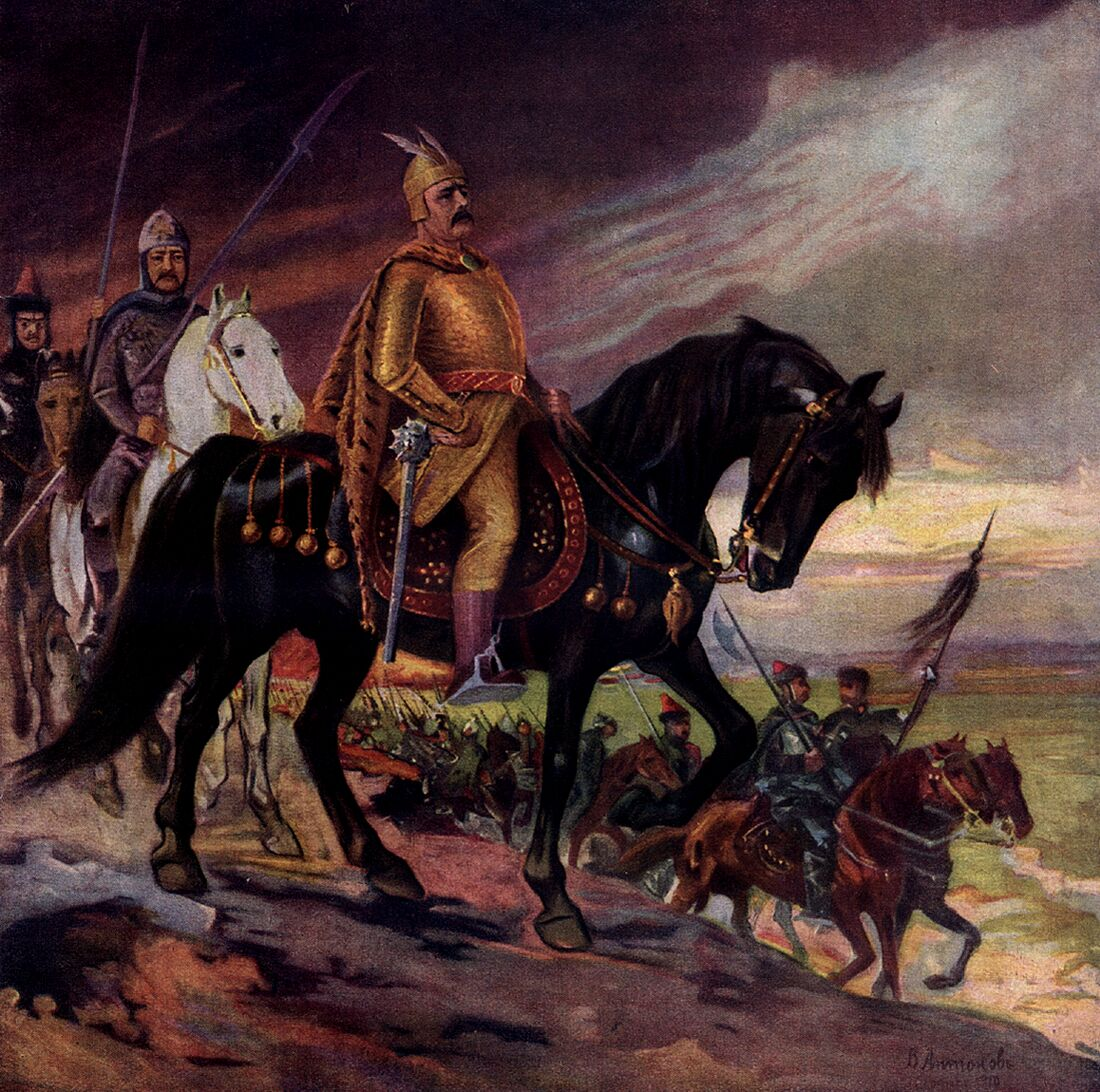
Khan Krum, painted 1917

The siege of Adrianople (Bulgarian: Обсада на Одрин) in 813 was a part of the wars of the Byzantine Empire with the Bulgarian khan Krum (Byzantine–Bulgarian wars).

It began soon after the Byzantine field army was defeated in the battle of Versinikia on 22 June. At first the besieging force was commanded by Krum's brother (whose name is not mentioned in the primary sources but is sometimes associated with Dukum). The khan himself went on with an army to besiege Constantinople. After an unsuccessful Byzantine attempt to murder him ruined all prospects for negotiations with them, Krum ravaged much of Eastern Thrace and then turned against Adrianople which was still under siege. The city—one of the most important Byzantine fortresses in Thrace—held out for a while despite being attacked with siege engines. Yet, without any help from outside, the garrison was forced to capitulate due to starvation. On Krum's orders, the population of Adrianople and the surrounding area (numbering about 10,000) was transferred to Bulgarian lands across the Danube.

Under the peace treaty concluded in 815, Adrianople remained in the Byzantine empire.

== Sources ==
- Runciman, Steven: A history of the First Bulgarian Empire, G. Bell & Sons, London 1930 (online edition "Books about Macedonia", retrieved on 23.12.2008)
- Гюзелев, В. Кавханите и ичиргу-боилите на българското ханство-царство (VII-XI в.), Пловдив 2007, ISBN 978-954-91983-1-7
- Златарски, В. История на българската държава през средните векове, том I, част 1, София 1970 (цитиран по електронното издание в „Книги за Македония“, достъп от 2.1.2009)
- Острогорски, Г. История на византийската държава, София 1998, ISBN 954-8079-92-5
- Рънсиман, Ст. История на Първото българско царство, ИК „Иван Вазов“, София 1993
- Fine, J. The Early Medieval Balkans: A Critical Survey from the Sixth to the Late Twelfth Century, University of Michigan Press, 1991, ISBN 0-472-08149-7
