= Dimitar Polyanov =

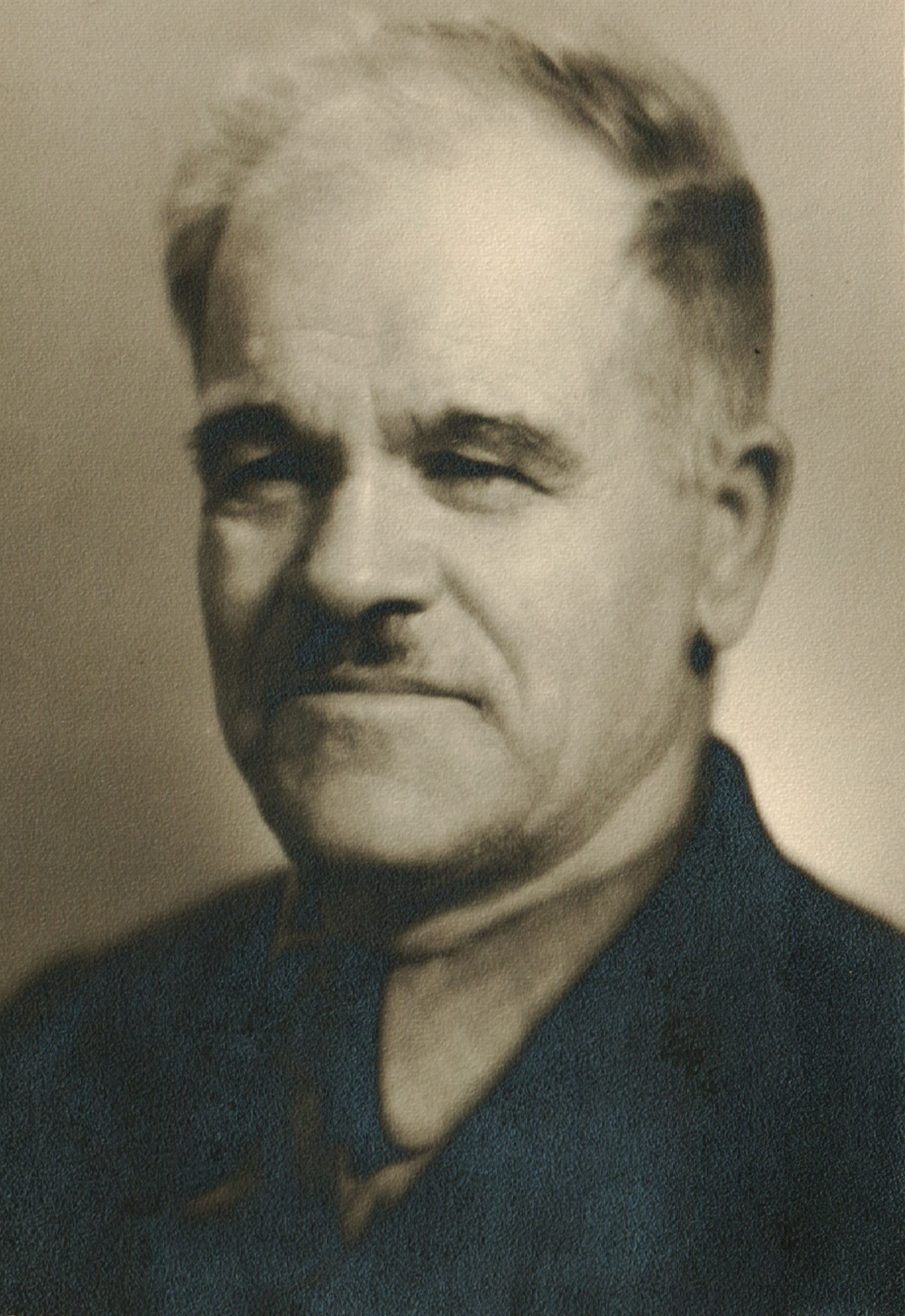
- Polyanov in 1945
- Born: Dimitar Ivanov Popov; 4 December 1876; Karnobat, Ottoman Empire
- Died: 25 September 1953 (aged 76); Sofia, Bulgarian People's Republic
- Occupations: Poet, prose writer, short story writer
- Writing career
- Literary movement: Social realism Socialist realism

Dimitar Ivanov Popov (Bulgarian: Димитър Иванов Попов; December 1876 – 25 September 1953), better known on the literary pseudonym Dimitar Polyanov (Димитър Полянов), was a Bulgarian poet, writer and translator who is considered one of the founders of Bulgarian socialist literature.

== Biography ==
Polyanov was born in the town of Karnobat, where his father was an active member of the local community and member of an underground anti-Ottman revolutionary group. His mother was one of the founders of the first women's society in Karnobat.

As a young boy, he became enamoured with Russian literature after being introduced to the poetry of Pushkin and Nekrasov, and was influenced by the ideas of Nikolai Chernyshevsky and Nikolai Dobrolyubov. He made his first literary attempts as a student at the Sliven Men's Gymnasium and in 1894 published his first story. From 1892 he was a member of one of the first social democratic organizations in Bulgaria. A participant in the First Balkan War, Polyanov remained a reserve officer Second Balkan War and First World War.

After finishing school, he dreamed of becoming an artist, but soon went to Nancy (France), deciding to study medicine. Under the influence of French literature, Polyanov once again began his literary career. After returning to Bulgaria, Polyanov began writing for many left-wing magazines and newspapers. Since writing alone could not financially support him, he also worked as a teacher throughout the 1920s and 30s.

After the September 9th Coup of 1944, Dimitar Polyanov became a member of the Sixth Supreme Chamber of the People's Court, the chamber responsible for prosecution of "pro-fascist" intellectuals, journalists and other propagandists. He was also elected a member of the National Assembly.

Polyanov continued his literary career by translating the works of Russian and French writers in Bulgarian. In 1950, Polyanov became a Laureate of the Dimitrov Prize. He was buried at the Central Sofia Cemetery.
