= Bencho Obreshkov =

Bulgarian painter (1899–1970)

Bencho Yordanov Obreshkov (Bulgarian: Бенчо Йорданов Обрешков, 27 April 1899, Karnobat – 8 April 1970, Sofia) was a renowned Bulgarian painter.

From 1914 to 1918 Obreshkov studied in Burgas. The he moved to Sofia, where he graduated under Petko Klissurov and Ivan Angelov from the Sofia Academy of Fine Arts in 1920. Later, he specialized in painting under Oskar Kokoschka and Otto Dix in the Dresden Academy of Fine Arts in 1926 and sculpture under Antoine Bourdelle, Paris in 1925—1927. Obreshkov returned to Bulgaria in 1927. He was a member of the "Native Arts" Union (1927), a member of the Union of the New Artists (1931), and its chairman (1937).

The painting by Obreshkov is innovative for Bulgarian art of the 1930s and has a special attention to color and form.
