= Malomirovo =

Town in Bulgaria

Coordinates: 42°8′32″N 26°38′34″E

Malomirovo Маломирово
- Village
- Interactive map of Malomirovo
- Location within Bulgaria
- Country: Bulgaria
- Province: Yambol
- Municipality: Elhovo Municipality

Area
  - Total: 31.609 km^{2} (12.204 sq mi)
- Elevation: 126 m (413 ft)

Malomirovo (Bulgarian: Маломирово) is a village in the Yambol Province, south-eastern Bulgaria.

As of 2007 it has 409 inhabitants.

The village is probably the location of the medieval castle Versinikia (Greek: Βερσινικία) near which in 813 the Bulgarian Khan Krum decisively defeated the Byzantines.
