= Siege of Constantinople (813) =

Failed siege of Constantinople in 813

- Part of the Byzantine–Bulgarian wars
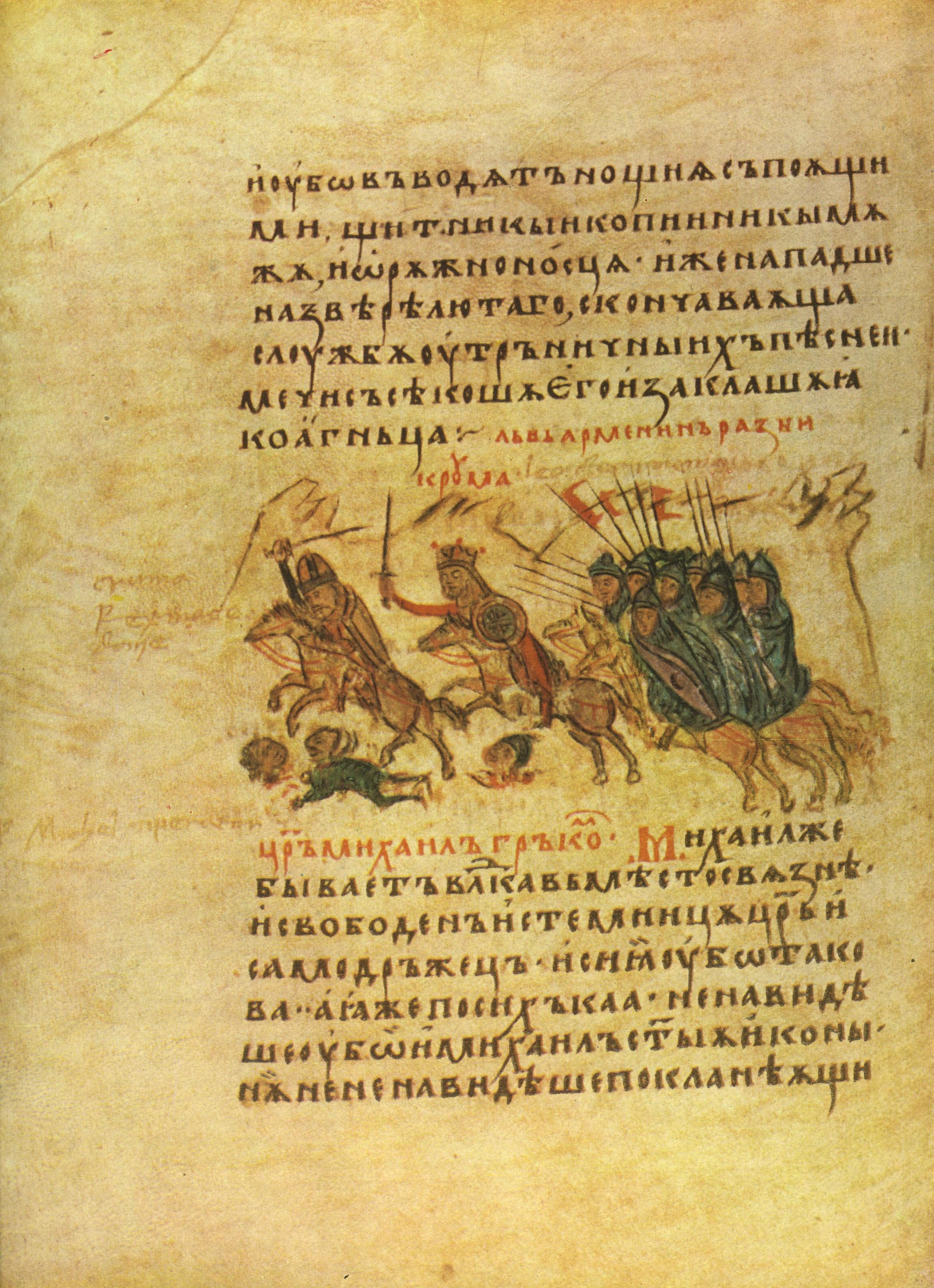
- Byzantine emperor Leo V the Armenian pursuing Khan Krum (from the Constantine Manasses Chronicle, 14 century.)
Location	Constantinople, Byzantine Empire
Result	Byzantine victory

Belligerents
First Bulgarian Empire	Byzantine Empire

Commanders and leaders
Krum (WIA)	Leo V

The siege of Constantinople in 813 (Bulgarian: Обсада на Константинопол) by Khan Krum (Bulgarian: Крум) was a failed attempt to take the city during the Byzantine–Bulgarian wars.

== The siege ==
After the Battle of Versinikia (or Second Battle of Adrianople) on 22 June 813, which was a defeat for the Byzantines, Krum's cavalry pursued them and taking advantage of this defeat, Krum advanced towards the walls of Constantinople. Michael I Rangabe was forced to abdicate and become a monk, becoming the third Byzantine emperor removed by Krum since 811.

Krum arrived at the city on 17 July 813, and performed a pagan sacrificial ritual involving animals and people in order to impress and force the defenders to surrender. But it was a failure and when Krum saw that the walls were impregnable, he decided to propose peace to the new Byzantine emperor Leo V the Armenian.

Krum proposed a meeting, but the Byzantines had set a trap, and he was wounded by archers but managed to flee.
Furious, Krum ravaged the environs of Constantinople on the way home, then took Adrianople and deported its inhabitants (including the parents of the future Basil I) across the Danube. Despite the arrival of winter, Krum took advantage of the good weather to send 30,000 men to Thrace. This army occupied Arcadiopolis and captured 50,000 prisoners. The sack of Thrace enriched Krum and his aristocracy, and allowed the use of those architectural elements looted from the cities in the rebuilding of his capital Pliska. The deported artisans also dedicated themselves to rebuilding the city.

Krum spent the winter preparing a major attack on Constantinople, where a rumor reported the creation of multiple artillery pieces carried on five thousand wagons. But Krum died on 13 April 814, and his son Omurtag succeeded him. The new attack on Constantinople came to nothing and Omurtag signed the Byzantine–Bulgarian treaty of 815.

== Sources ==
- The Early Medieval Balkans: A Critical Survey from the Sixth to the Late Twelfth Century by John Van Antwerp Fine Jr. Page 98-99
- RYCHLÍK, Jan a kol. Dějiny Bulharska. Praha : Nakladatelství Lidové noviny, 2000. ISBN 80-7106-404-1. page 46.
- DRŠKA, Václav; PICKOVÁ, Dana. Dějiny středověké Evropy. Praha : Nakladatelství Aleš Skřivan ml., 2004. ISBN 80-86493-11-3. page 69.
