= Battle of Marcellae (756) =

Battle near Karnobat in Bulgaria

- Part of the Byzantine–Bulgarian wars
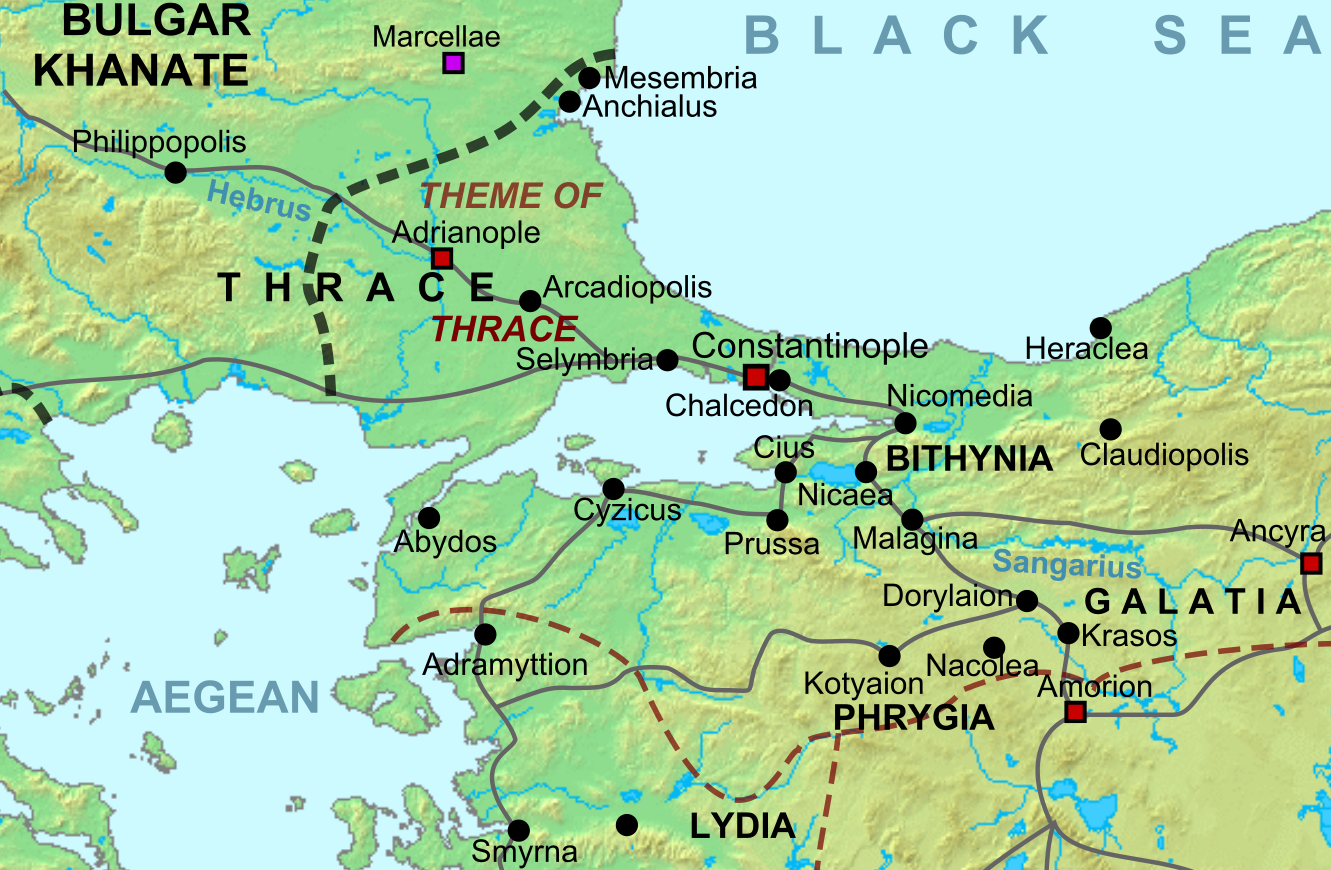
- Battle of Marcellae (756)
Date	756
Location	Markeli, near Karnobat, Bulgaria 42°38′15.48″N 26°53′47.48″E
Result	Byzantine victory

Belligerents
Bulgarian Empire	Byzantine Empire

Commanders and leaders
Vinekh	Constantine V

Strength
Unknown	Unknown

Casualties and losses
Unknown	Unknown

The Battle of Marcellae (Bulgarian: Битката при Маркели, Greek: Μάχη των Μαρκελλών) took place in 756 between the armies of the First Bulgarian Empire and the Byzantine Empire at Markeli, near the town of Karnobat in south eastern Bulgaria. The result was a Byzantine victory.

== Origins of the conflict ==
In 755, the long peace between Bulgaria and the Byzantine Empire came to an end. This was mainly because, after significant victories over the Arabs, the Byzantine Emperor Constantine V began to fortify his border with Bulgaria. To this aim he resettled heretics from Armenia and Syria in Thrace. Khan Kormisosh took those actions, and the construction of a new fortress along the border, as a breach of the Byzantine–Bulgarian Treaty of 716, signed by Tervel. The Bulgarian ruler sent envoys to ask for tribute for the new fortresses. After the refusal of the Roman Emperor, the Bulgarian army invaded Thrace. Looting everything on their way, the Bulgarians reached the outskirts of Constantinople, where they were engaged and defeated by Byzantine troops.

== Battle ==
In the next year, Constantine V organized a large campaign against Bulgaria which was now ruled by a new khan, Vinekh. An army was sent with 500 ships which plundered the area around the Danube Delta. The Emperor himself, leading the main force, advanced into Thrace, and was engaged by the Bulgarians at the border castle of Marcellae. The details of the battle are unknown but it resulted in a great victory for Constantine V. In order to stop the invasion, the Bulgarians sent hostages to Constantinople. However, three years later (759), Constantine invaded Bulgaria once more, but suffered a crushing defeat in the Battle of the Rishki Pass.
