= Markeli =

Coordinates: 42°38′15.48″N 26°53′47.48″E

Markeli Маркели
- Burgas Province, Bulgaria
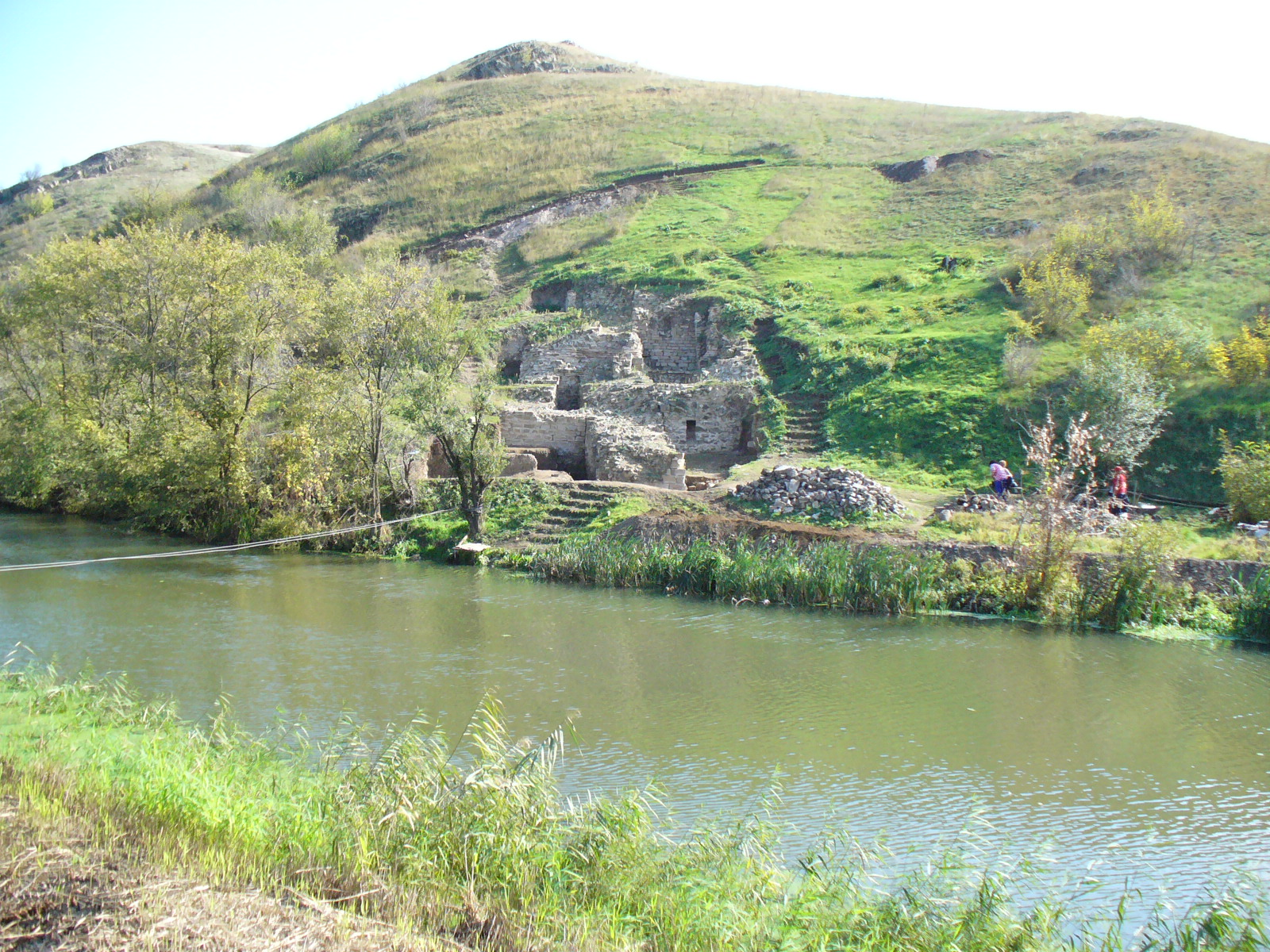
- Markeli's Well Tower on the banks of the Mochuritsa.

Site information
- Condition: In ruins

Location

Site history
- Events: Byzantine–Bulgarian Wars (Battle of Marcellae (756), Battle of Marcellae (792))

Markeli (Bulgarian: Маркели; Greek: Μαρκέλλαι, Markellai; Latin: Marcellae) was a medieval Byzantine and Bulgarian frontier stronghold, the ruins of which are located in Karnobat Municipality, Burgas Province, southeastern Bulgaria. Dating to Late Antiquity, the castle lay some 7.5 kilometres (4.7 miles) from the modern town of Karnobat. It was the site of two notable medieval battles between Byzantines and Bulgarians, the Battle of Marcellae of 756 and the Battle of Marcellae of 792.

== History ==
Markeli acquired its strategic importance in the late 7th century, when the establishment of the First Bulgarian Empire and its expansion turned it into a vital frontier stronghold just south of the Balkan Mountains. It would often change hands between Bulgarians and Byzantines, who would use it as a favourable starting point for military campaigns southwards and northwards respectively. Markeli first came under Bulgarian rule in 705, when it, together with the whole region of Zagore, was ceded to Bulgaria by Justinian II.

In 756, Byzantine Emperor Constantine V organized a campaign against Bulgaria. The previous year, Bulgarian forces under Kormisosh had plundered Byzantine Thrace and reached the capital Constantinople, though by 756 the Bulgarian throne was occupied by Vineh. Constantine V's army advanced into Thrace and was engaged by Bulgarian forces at Markeli, which at the time was a border fortress. The Byzantines came out victorious in the skirmish, and to prevent a further invasion, the Bulgarian ruler Vineh had to send hostages to Constantinople.

In 792, Markeli was once more in the centre of a major Byzantine–Bulgarian conflict. The second battle of Marcellae came during a long period of aggression between Byzantium and Bulgaria, with Bulgarian ruler Kardam and Byzantine Emperor Constantine VI each invading foreign territory in the past few years. Due to strategic errors, the Byzantines suffered a heavy blow in this battle. Some of the emperor's personal servants and eminent strategoi were killed by the Bulgarians, who also captured the emperor's tent, treasury and horses.

In 811, Nikephoros I Logothetes's forces departed from Markeli in their ill-fated invasion of Bulgaria, which saw the emperor being killed at the hands of the Bulgarians in the Battle of Pliska. Byzantine scholar Anna Komnene writes that in 1089 her father Alexios I Komnenos had conflicts and negotiations with the Pechenegs and Cumans who had pitched their tents at Markeli (Marcellae). The fortress was manned and populated until some time in the 12th century.

== Location and description ==
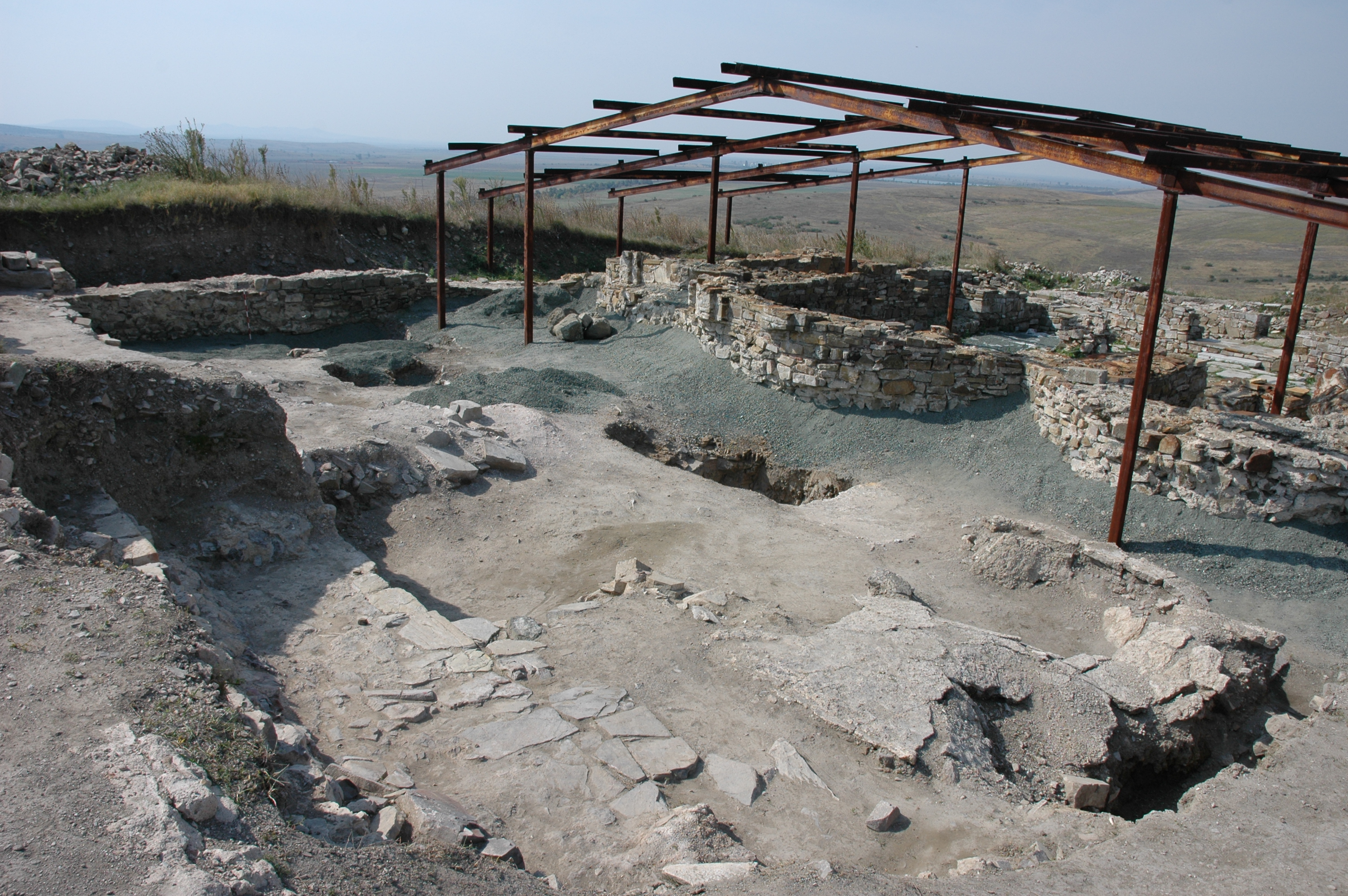
Ruins of the basilica within the castle.

Markeli is situated south of the Balkan Mountains near the Mochuritsa river, a major tributary of the Tundzha, at the point where the river flows out of the Karnobat Valley at on the western tip of the Hisar Heights. The stronghold's location was selected so as to defend the Rish and Varbitsa mountain passes. It was the starting point of a chain of Bulgarian fortifications along the route to the early medieval capital Pliska crossing the mountains. The area was inhabited before the castle's construction, as indicated by traces of prehistoric and Iron Age settlements and Ancient Roman burial mounds in the surrounding area.

Archaeological research of the fortress has been conducted since 1986. It has revealed that the castle was built in Late Antiquity (the early Byzantine period). The fortifications were constructed out of crushed stones with integrated rows of bricks and are thought to date to the reign of either Anastasius I (491–518) or Justinian I (527–565), i.e. the late 5th to mid-6th century. The ramparts were up to 10 metres (33 ft) high and had over 3-metre (9.8 ft) ditches before them. The entire fortress, including the embankments dating to the early 9th century, had an area of 173 acres (0.70 km^{2}).

The ruins of a Christian church (basilica) that have been unearthed in the eastern part of the castle are equally old as the fortifications. A well tower was positioned in the vicinity of the river in order to control access to the fortress and provide water for the defenders. An ancient bridge crossed the river near the tower, and an underground passage served as another way for the inhabitants to enter or leave Markeli.

== Gallery ==
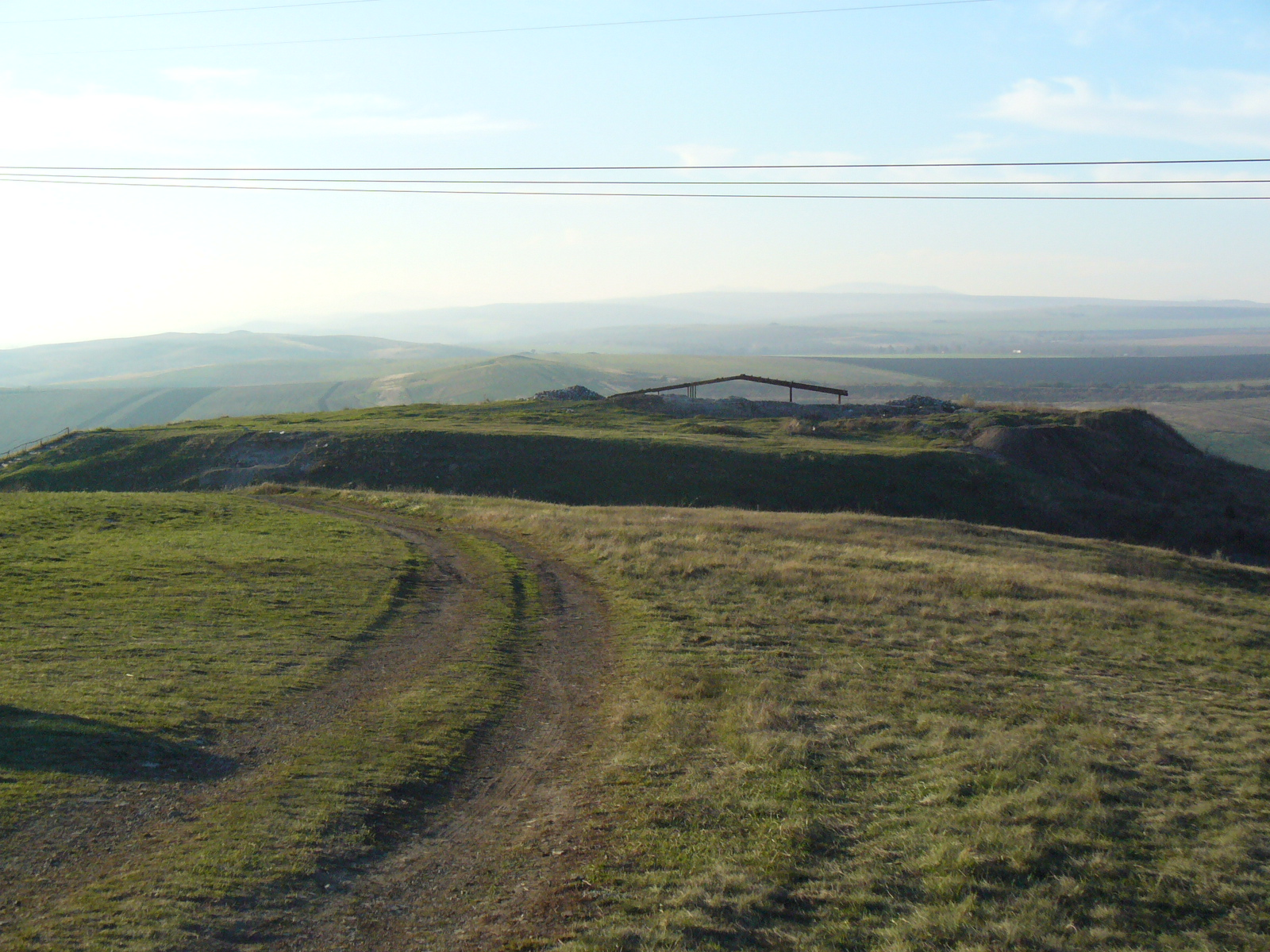
Overview of the castle ruins.

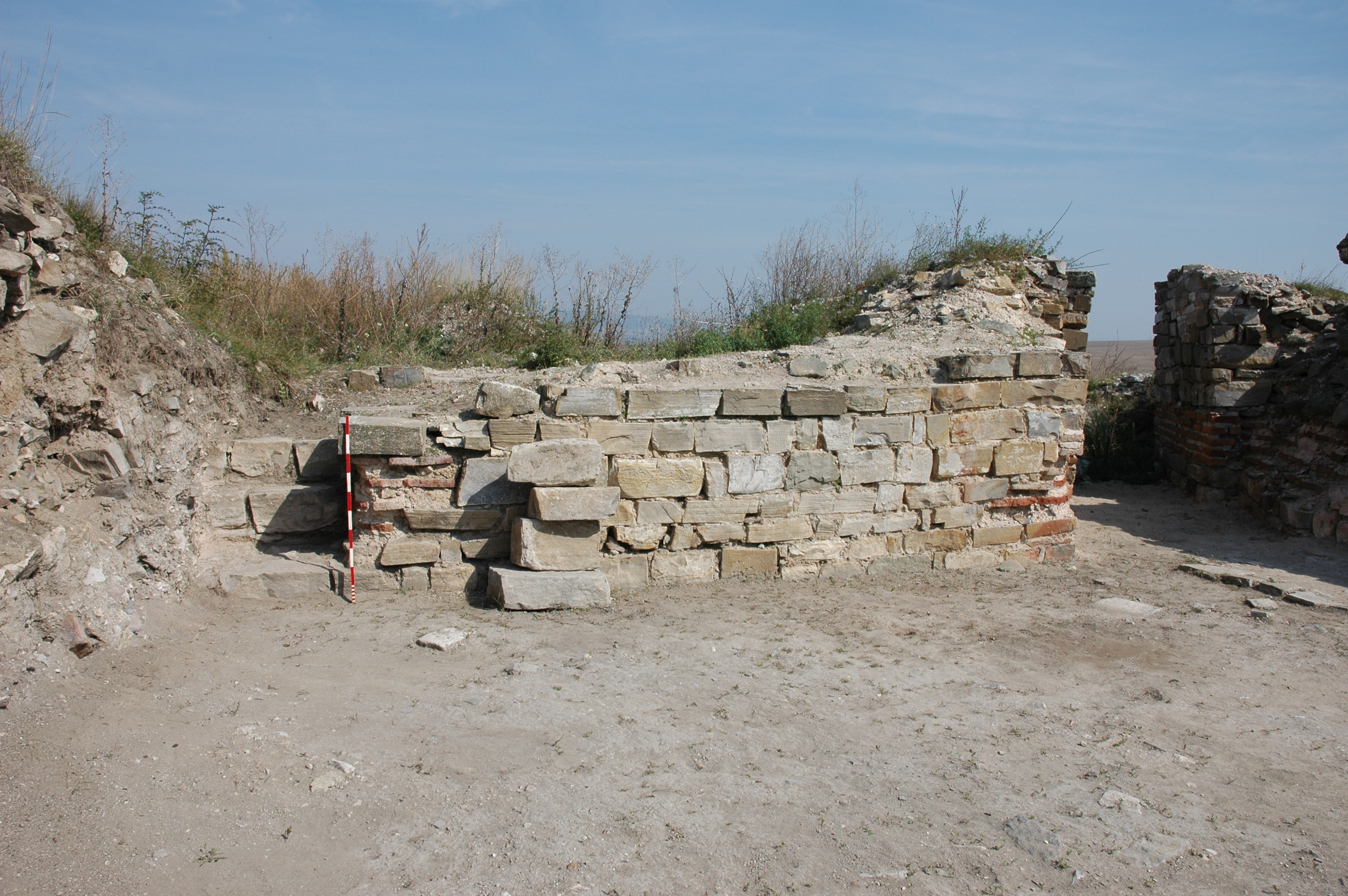
Part of the defensive wall with a tower entrance.

Cross section of a rampart.
