= Krum =

Khan of Bulgaria from 803 to 814

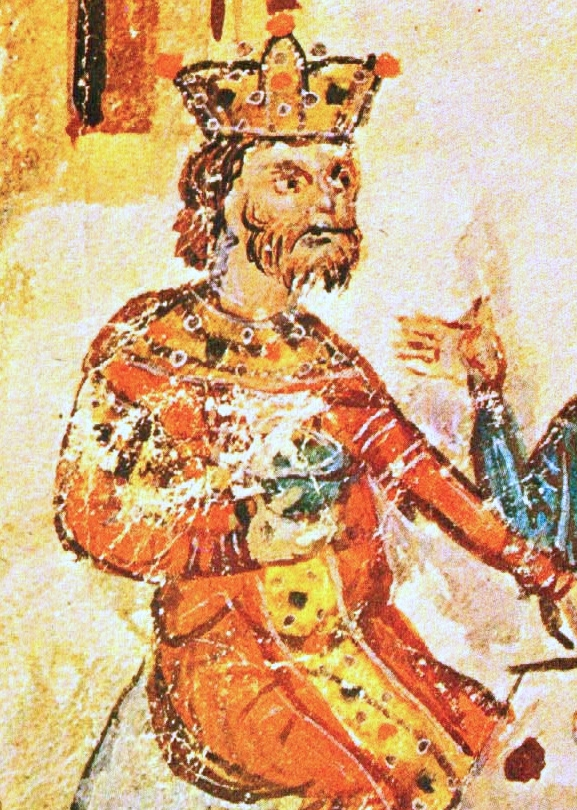
- A 14th-century depiction of Krum

Khan of Bulgaria
- Reign: 796–803 to 814
- Predecessor: Kardam
- Successor: Omurtag
- Born: c. mid 8th century
- Died: 13 April 814
- Spouse: Unknown
- Issue: Omurtag; Budim
- House: Krum's dynasty (possibly Dulo)
- Religion: Tengrism

Krum (Bulgarian: Крум, Greek: Κροῦμος/Kroumos (Note: His name is also rarely spelled Kroum. In Bulgarian historiography, he is also known by the epithet "the Fearsome" (Крум Страшни/Krum Strashni).)), often referred to as Krum the Fearsome (c. mid 8th century – 13 April 814), was the Khan of First Bulgarian Empire from sometime between 796 and 803 until his death in 814. During his reign the Bulgarian territory doubled in size, spreading from the middle Danube to the Dnieper and from Odrin to the Tatra Mountains. His able and energetic rule brought law and order to Bulgaria and developed the rudiments of state organization.

== Name and title ==
The Bulgar name Krum (also rarely spelled "Kroum") as attested in the records is probably of Turkic origin. The historian Haussig has compared the name of another ruler, Grumbates, which has been reconstructed as Old Turkic form *qurum-pat, "government leader". The name Krum would then reflect a shortened form, *qurum. (Note: "Der Name des Fürsten, Grumbates, könnte ein alttürkisches *Qurum-pat 'Regierungsfürst' wiedergeben, denn *Qurum in der Form Krum ist als Bezeichnung eines bulgarischen Khans sowohl in der Bulgarischen Fürstenliste als auch in der griechischen Überlieferung nachweisbar." ("The name of the ruler, Grumbates, may reflect Old Turkish *Qurum-pat, 'government leader', given that *Qurum (written 'Krum') is attested as the title of a Bulgarian Khan in both the Bulgarian list of kings, and the Greek records.")) This word itself designates "rule, leadership, authority". (Note: "Krum könnte auf türkisch qurum Regierung weisen, eine Bedeutung, die den Gebrauch des Wortes als Bezeichnung eines Fürsten erklären würde." ("Krum may belong with Turkish qurum ('government'), a meaning which may explain its use as the title of a ruler."))

== Biography ==
=== Origins ===
Krum was born around the middle of the 8th century, but his family background and the circumstances of his accession are unknown. It has been speculated that Krum might have been a descendant of Khan Kubrat through his son Kuber.

=== Establishment of new borders ===
Around 805, Krum defeated the Avar Khaganate to destroy the remainder of the Avars and advanced northward into the Tisza region. However, as stated by the History of Transylvania "[t]here is no sign that Krum's military campaign touched Transylvania, nor that any part of the Carpathian Basin was occupied by Bulgars in the first decade of the 9th century." This resulted in the establishment of a common border between the Frankish Empire and Bulgaria, which would have important repercussions for the policy of Krum's successors.

=== Conflict with Nikephoros I ===
Krum engaged in a policy of territorial expansion. In 807, Bulgarian forces defeated the Byzantine army in the Struma valley. In 809 Krum besieged and forced the surrender of Serdica, slaughtering the garrison of 6,000 despite a guarantee of safe conduct. This victory provoked Byzantine Emperor Nikephoros I to settle Anatolian populations along the frontier to protect it and to attempt to retake and refortify Serdica, although this enterprise failed.

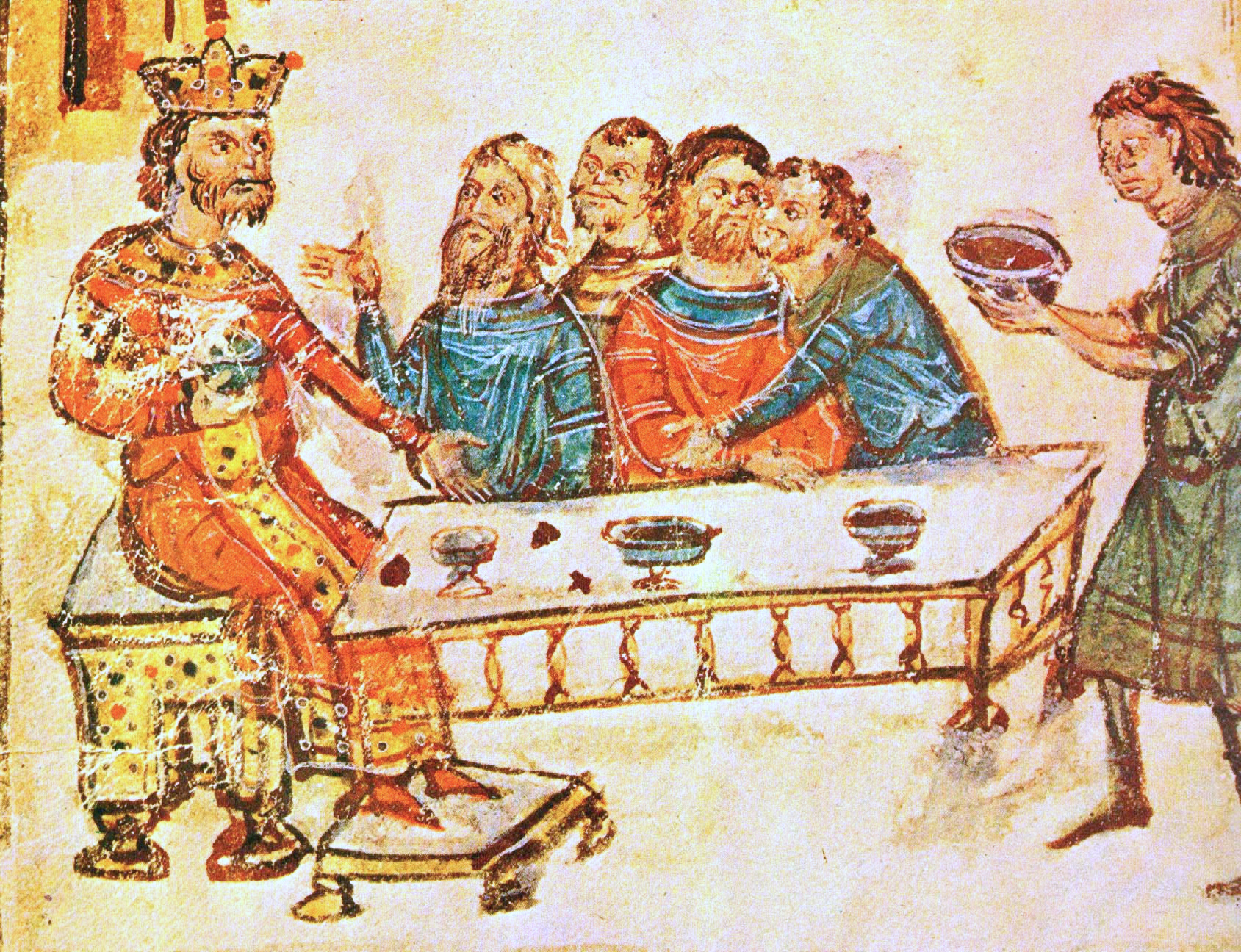
Krum feasts with his nobles as a servant (right) brings the skull of Nikephoros I, fashioned into a drinking cup, filled with wine

In early 811, Nikephoros I undertook a massive expedition against Bulgaria, advancing to Marcellae (near Karnobat). Here Krum attempted to negotiate on 11 July 811, but Nikephoros was determined to continue with his campaign. His army somehow avoided Bulgarian ambushes in the Balkan Mountains and made its way into Moesia. They managed to take over Pliska on 20 July, as only a small, hastily assembled army was in their way. Here Nikephoros helped himself to the treasures of the Bulgarians while setting the city afire and turning his army on the population. A new diplomatic initiative from Krum was rebuffed.

The chronicle of the 12th-century patriarch of the Syrian Jacobites, Michael the Syrian, describes the brutalities and atrocities of Nikephoros: "Now Nicephorus [sic] went with a large force against the Bulghars [sic]. He reached the capital city of their kingdom and caused great destruction, to the point that he threw their little children on the ground and mercilessly drove over them with his threshing wagons."

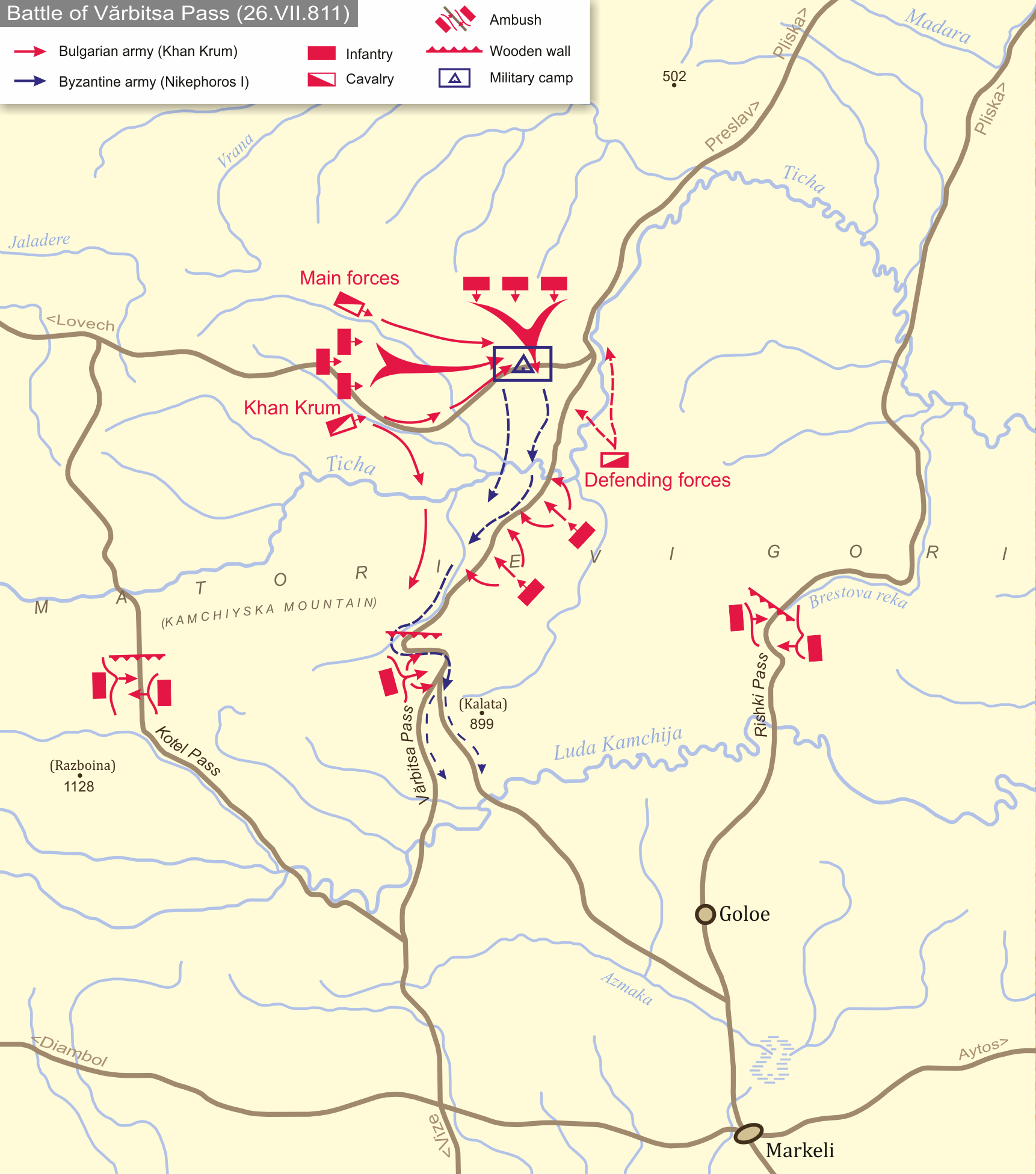
Battle at Varbitsa Pass (811)

While Nikephoros I and his army pillaged and plundered the Bulgarian capital, Krum mobilized as many soldiers as possible, giving weapons to women and even to peasants. This army was assembled in the mountain passes to intercept the Byzantines as they returned to Constantinople. At dawn on 26 July, the Bulgarians managed to trap the retreating Nikephoros in the Varbitsa Pass. The Byzantine army was wiped out in the ensuing battle and Nikephoros was killed, while his son Staurakios was carried to safety by the imperial bodyguard after receiving a paralyzing wound to the neck. It is said that Krum had the Emperor's skull lined with silver and used it as a drinking cup.

=== Conflict with Michael I Rangabe ===
Staurakios was forced to abdicate after a brief reign (he died from his wound in 812), and he was succeeded by his brother-in-law Michael I Rangabe. In 812 Krum invaded Byzantine Thrace, taking Develt and scaring the population of nearby fortresses to flee towards Constantinople. From this position of strength, Krum offered a return to the peace treaty of 716. Unwilling to compromise from a position of weakness, the new Emperor Michael I refused to accept the proposal, ostensibly opposing the clause for exchange of deserters. To apply more pressure on the Emperor, Krum besieged and captured Mesembria (Nesebar) in the autumn of 812.

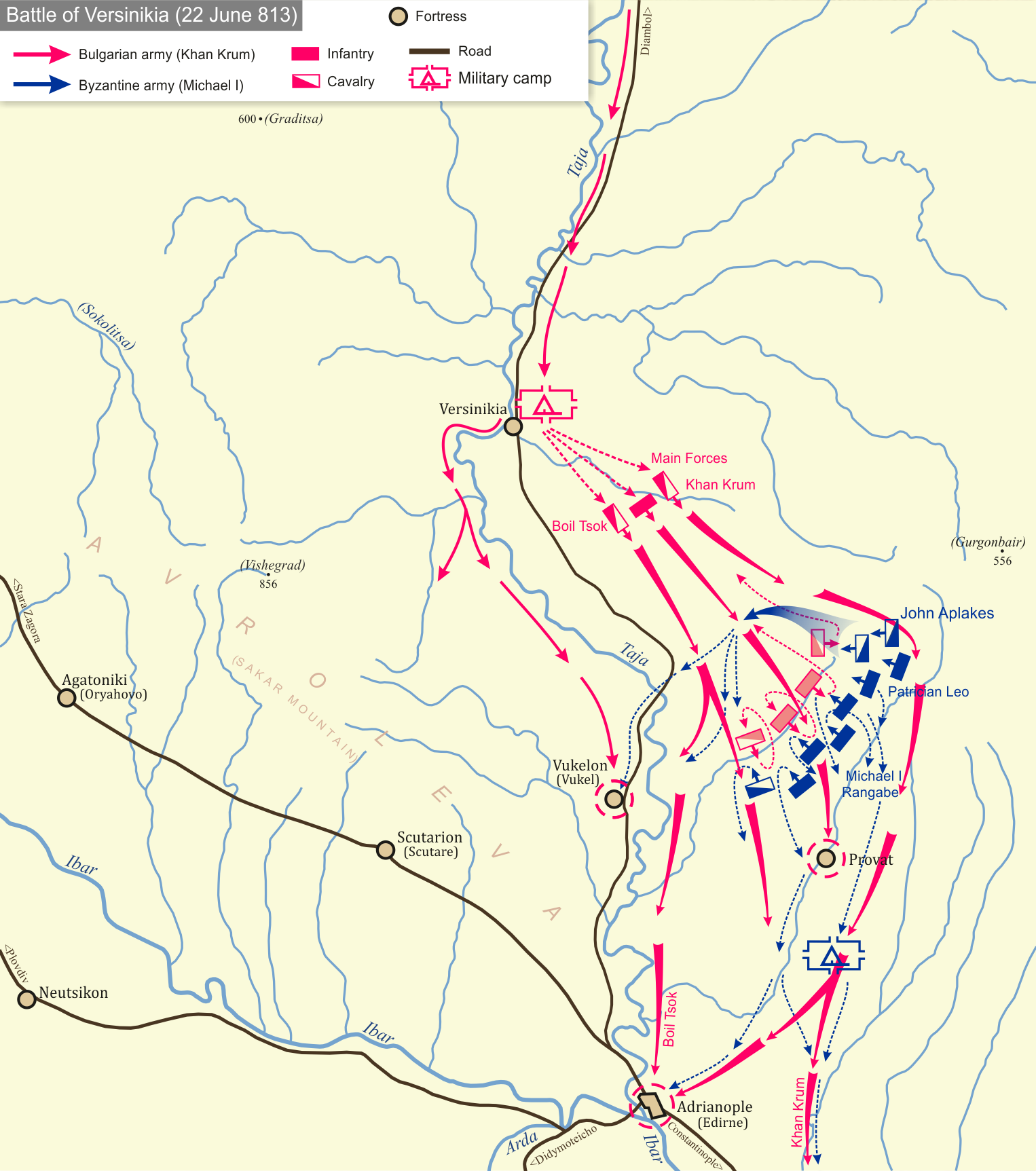
Battle at Versinikia (813)

In February 813, the Bulgarians raided Thrace, but were repelled by the Emperor's forces. Encouraged by this success, Michael I summoned troops from the entire Byzantine Empire and headed north, hoping for a decisive victory. Krum led his army south towards Adrianople and pitched camp near Versinikia. Michael I lined up his army against the Bulgarians, but neither side initiated an attack for two weeks. The Battle of Versinikia finally commenced on 22 June 813, when the Byzantines attacked and were immediately turned to flight. With Krum's cavalry in pursuit, the rout of Michael I was complete, and Krum advanced on Constantinople. On the way, most of the fortresses, hearing about the strength of the Bulgarian army, surrendered without a fight. Only Adrianople resisted, and was besieged by Krum's brother, possibly named Dukum. Krum himself reached Constantinople and performed an impressive pagan ceremony before its walls, sacrificing people and animals. This made a great impression on the inhabitants of Constantinople and was even described by Theophanes the Confessor and the Scriptor incertus (an anonymous Byzantine short chronicle describing the events of the period 811 – 820). In addition, Krum ordered a moat with a rampart to be dug from Blachernae to the Golden Gate, surrounding the capital on the land side. These siege preparations were more a demonstration of strength than a serious attempt to capture the city. The aim was to force the Byzantine rulers to conclude a peace with which they would recognize the conquests of the Bulgarians.

The discredited Michael was forced to abdicate and become a monk; he was the third Byzantine Emperor forced to give up the throne by Krum in as many years.

=== Conflict with Leo V the Armenian ===
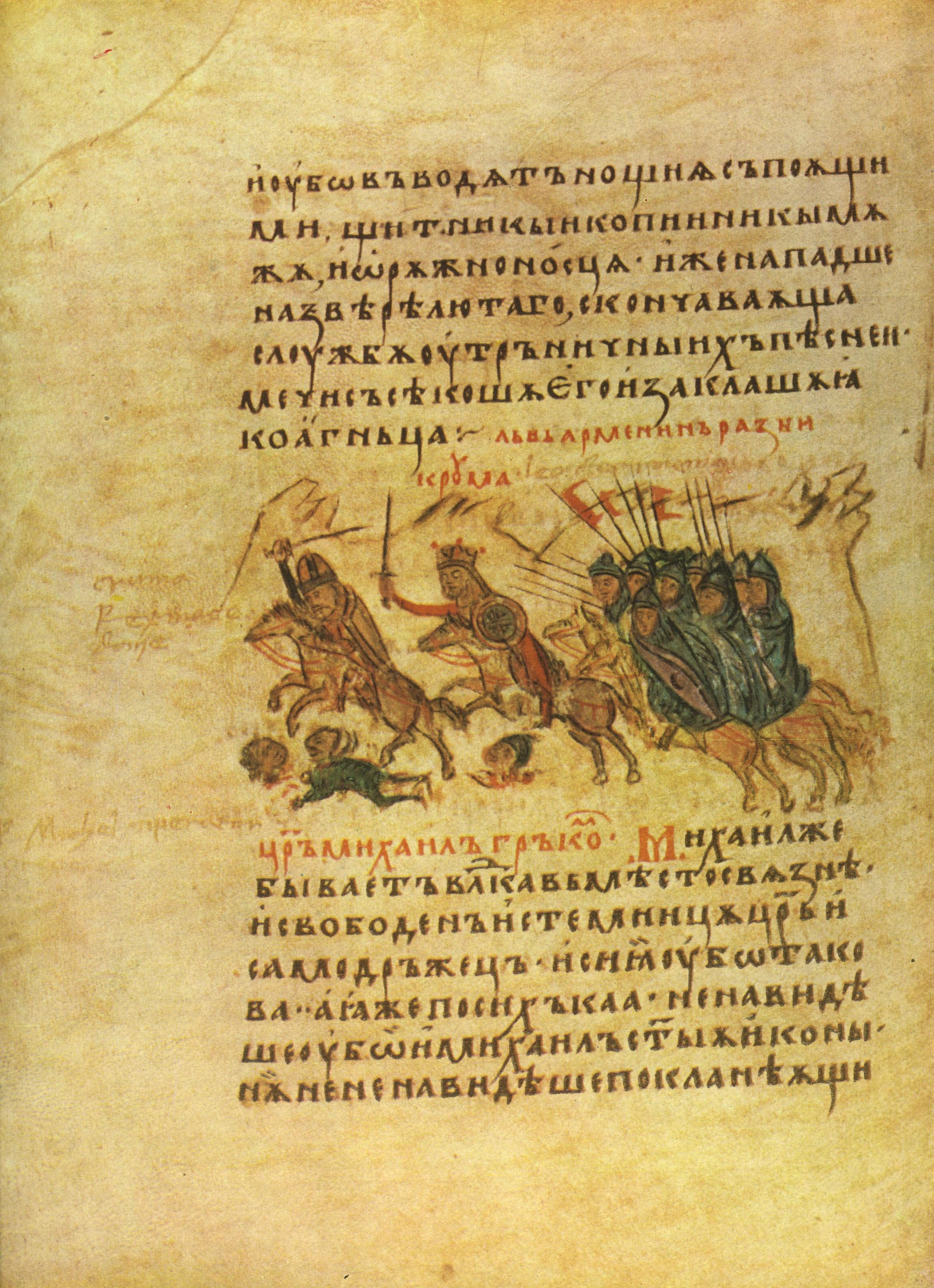
Krum is being pursued by the army of Leo V. Miniature from the 12th-century Manasses Chronicle.

Michael's successor Leo V the Armenian started the peace negotiations, with a secret intention to assassinate Krum. The two sides agreed to a meeting between small groups of unarmed negotiators. Leo V was not present, while Krum attended in the company of Kavkhan Iratais and Konstantin Pacik (Krum's son-in-law, who was most likely used as a translator). Leo's agents ambushed the group, but Krum, who had guessed what was happening, escaped after being wounded. The Kavkhan was killed, and Konstantin Patsik together with his son (Krum's nephew) were captured. Enraged by the actions of the Romans, Krum ordered the looting and burning of churches and monasteries in Eastern Thrace. His wrath culminated in the fall of Adrianople and the capture of 10,000 soldiers defending the city (including the parents of the future Emperor Basil I). Although Krum realized the defensive capabilities of the Byzantine capital, he ordered massive preparations for the attack on Constantinople to begin, which included Slavs, Avars and special siege equipment ("turtles", battle towers, "rams", flamethrowers, etc.). Worried by all these preparations, the emperor began to strengthen the city walls and defenses. But this grandiose plan of the Bulgarian ruler was not implemented. On April 13, 814, Krum died, most likely of a hemorrhage and stroke.

== Legacy ==
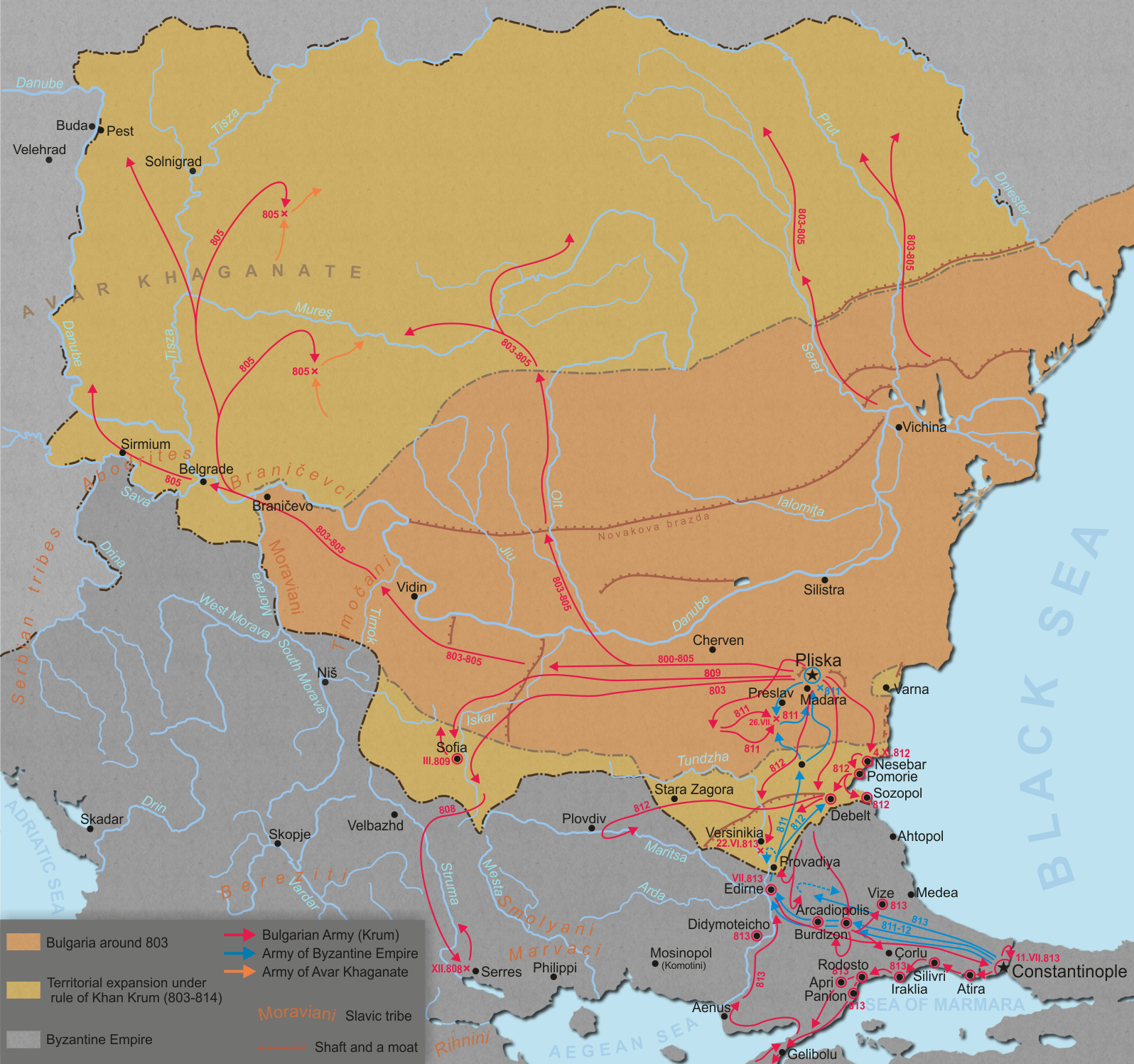
Bulgaria under Khan Krum (new territories gained under his rule are in lighter orange)

Krum was remembered for instituting the first known written Bulgarian law code, which ensured subsidies to beggars and state protection to all poor Bulgarians. Drinking of alcohol, slander, and robbery were severely punished. Through his laws he became known as a strict but just ruler, bringing Slavs and Bulgars into a centralized state.

Novels have been written on his life, such as by Dmityar Mantov and Ivan Bogdanov.

== See also ==
- History of Bulgaria
- Bulgars

== Works cited ==
=== Primary sources ===
- Chronicle of Michael the Great. Translated by Bedrosian, Robert. Sophene. 2025.
- De Boor, Carl, ed. (1883–85). Theophanis Chronographia [The Chronicle of Theophanes the Confessor]. Leipzig: Teubner.
- Iman, Bahši (1997). Җәгъфәр тарихы [History of Cäğfär]. Vol. 3. Orenburg.

=== Secondary sources ===
- Andreev, Jordan; Lazarov, Ivan; Pavlov, Plamen (1999). Кой кой е в средновековна България [Who is Who in Medieval Bulgaria] (in Bulgarian). Sofia: Iztok-Zapad.
- Çağatay, Saadet (1988). "Prof. Dr. TALÂT TEKİN, Tuna Bulgarları ve Dilleri, Türk Dil Kurumu Yayınları 530, Ankara 1987". Review. Belleten (in Turkish). 52 (203). Türk Tarih Kurumu: 723–726.
- Fine, John Van Antwerp Jr. (1991). The Early Medieval Balkans: A Critical Survey from the Sixth to the Late Twelfth Century. Michigan: The University of Michigan Press. ISBN 0-472-08149-7.
- Haussig, Hans Wilhelm (1984). "Einige Bemerkungen zu der Arbeit von J. Werner über den Schatz von Malaja Pereščepina". Materialia Turcica (in German). 10. Studienverlag Brockmeyer: 1–30.
- Haussig, Hans Wilhelm (2000). "V. Herkunft, Wesen und Schicksal der Hunnen". In Roemer, Hans Robert; Scharlipp, Wolfgang-Ekkehard (eds.). History of the Turkic peoples in the pre-Islamic period. Philologiae et historiae Turcicae fundamenta (in German). Vol. 3. Franciscum Steiner. pp. 256–281. ISBN 978-3-87997-283-8.
- Ivanov, Lyubomir (2007). Essential History of Bulgaria in Seven Pages. Sofia: Bulgarian Academy of Sciences.
- Köpeczi, Béla, ed. (2001). History of Transylvania. New York: Columbia University Press.
- Norwich, John J. (1992). Byzantium. Vol. 2: The Apogee. Alfred A. Knopf. ISBN 9780394537795.
- Pavlov, Plamen (2019). Забравеното Средновековие [The Forgotten Middle Ages] (in Bulgarian). Sofia: Bulgarska Istoria.
- Sophoulis, Panos (2012). Byzantium and Bulgaria, 775–831. Leiden / Boston: Brill. ISBN 978-90-04-20695-3.
- Stepanov, Tsvetelin (2014). "Bulgar, Avar and Khazar Aristocratic Names in the Early Middle Ages". In Doncheva-Petkova, Lyudmila; Balogh, Csilla; Türk, Attila (eds.). Avars, Bulgars and Magyars on the Middle and Lower Danube. Archaeolinga. pp. 165–172.
- Tokushev, Dmityar (2009). История на българската средновековна държава и право [The History of the Medieval Bulgarian State and Law] (in Bulgarian). Sofia: Sibi.
- Zlatarski, Vazil N. (1970). История на българската държава през средните векове [History of the Bulgarian State in the Middle ages] (in Bulgarian). Vol. I (2nd ed.). Sofia: Nauka i Izkustvo. pp. 321–376.

Preceded by Kardam	Khan of Bulgaria; 803–814	Succeeded by Omurtag
