= Battle of Versinikia =

Part of the Byzantine-Bulgarian Wars

- Part of the Byzantine–Bulgarian wars
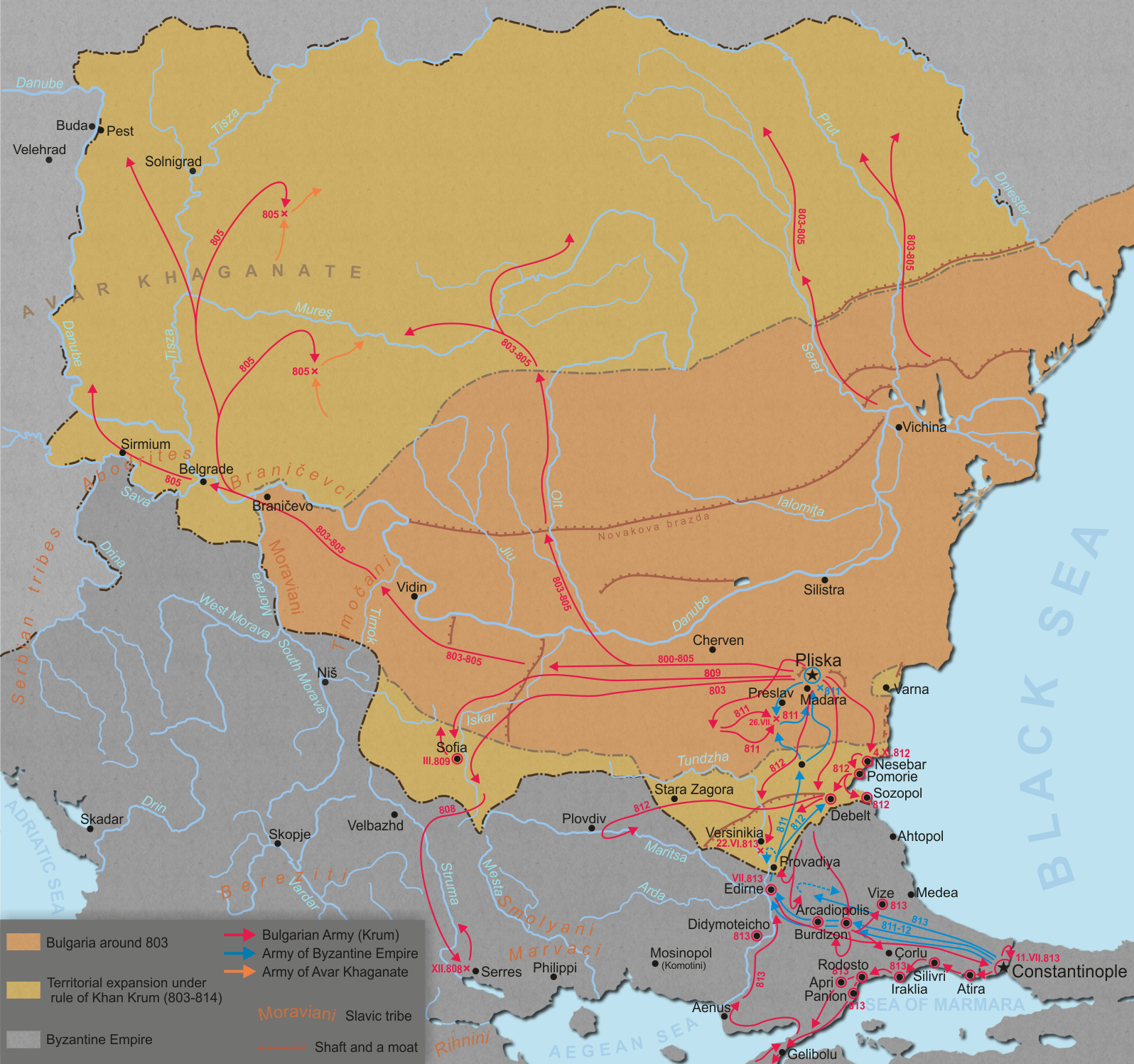
- Bulgaria under Khan Krum including the most important campaigns and battles
Date	22 June 813
Location	North of Adrianople, near Malomirovo (today Bulgaria)
Result	Bulgarian victory: Abdication of Michael I Rangabe

Belligerents
Bulgarian Empire	Byzantine Empire

Commanders and leaders
Kanasubigi Krum	Michael I Rangabe

Strength
6,000–7,000 or 12,000	20,000–30,000; 30,000–36,000

Casualties and losses
Unknown	2,000–3,000

Bulgarian Battle of Versinikia (Bulgarian: Битката при Версиникия; Greek: Μάχη της Βερσινικίας) was a battle fought in 813 AD between the Byzantine Empire and the Bulgarian Empire, near the city of Adrianople (Edirne), in modern-day Turkey.

The Bulgarian army, led by Krum of Bulgaria, defeated the Byzantine forces. Following this defeat, Michael I Rangabe abdicated, with Leo V the Armenian taking the Byzantine throne. The battle further strengthened Bulgarian control in the region after their victory over Nikephoros I two years earlier. After the battle, the Bulgarians controlled the whole region of Eastern Thrace (until the Byzantine–Bulgarian Treaty of 815), with the exception of a few castles that remained in Byzantine control. Krum died on 13 April 814, but his muster of "5,000 iron-plated wagons [ . . . ] to carry the siege equipment" alarmed the Byzantine court to such an effect that they asked for the aid of the Carolingian Emperor Louis the Pious. These large-scale military preparations were Krum's attempt to avenge his failure at the Second Bulgarian Siege of Constantinople one year prior.

== Prelude ==
After the Bulgarian victory over the Byzantine army of Emperor Nikephoros I in the Battle of Pliska in 811, the Byzantine Empire found itself in a difficult situation. The son of Nikephoros (and legitimate heir to the Imperial Purple), Emperor Staurakios, was badly wounded and paralyzed in the battle and was deposed in the autumn of the same year. After a palace coup d’état led by Ecumenical Patriarch Nikephoros I, Michael I Rangabe previously a courtier —Kouropalates, Supervisor of the Palace — during the reign of Nikephoros I was acclaimed emperor.

This came as a result of the political maneuvering by Michael's wife and daughter of Nikephoros I, Prokopia. Prokopia failed to persuade her brother Staurakios, who wanted to have Michael blinded, to name the latter as his successor, a group of senior officials (the magistros Theoktistos, Domestic of the Schools Stephen, and as mentioned above Patriarch Nikephoros I of Constantinople) forced Staurakios to abdicate in favor of Michael on 2 October 811. Michael was then proclaimed emperor before the senate and the tagmata.

Bulgaria had also suffered heavy losses and great material damage during Nikephoros' campaign, and needed to reorganize its army and replenish its resources. As a result, Bulgaria was unable to resume its advance until the next year. The Bulgarian attacks were concentrated mainly in Thrace and along the valley of the Strymōn (Struma) River. Several towns were pillaged in Eastern Thrace and the Bulgarians further advanced to and captured the city of Adrianople (Edirne). Adrianople was a strategically significant city, second only to Constantinople in importance for Byzantine control over the region. The Bulgarians would resettle Adrianople's 10,000 inhabitants to "Bulgaria across the Danube." In response to the Bulgarian raids and conquests, Michael I organized a warhost but was forced to return to Constantinople due to a conspiracy.

In the meantime, the Bulgarians continued to strike Thrace and were offered peace in the Autumn of 812. The Bulgarian delegation was led by a certain Dobromir, but the Byzantine Emperor declined the peace deal, possibly due to concerns related to item three of the Byzantine–Bulgarian Treaty of 716, which stated that "The refugees from both sides shall be mutually surrendered, if they are plotting against the authorities." That item was important for the Byzantines during the 8th century because the authority of their former Emperors was weakened and, after the crisis in Bulgaria in the mid 8th century, it had become inconvenient for them. In response to the refusal, the Bulgarians besieged Mesembria (Nessebar). They had siege machines built by an emigrant from Arabia and soon captured the town, where they found 36 copper siphons used to throw Greek fire and a large quantity of gold and silver.

== Preparations ==
Despite the strategic loss of Mesembria, the Byzantines declined to negotiate a settlement. During the winter of 812–813 Khan Krum began intense musters for an attack against Byzantium, while Michael I prepared for defense. In February 813 Bulgarian forces made several scouting raids into Thrace, but quickly pulled back after several clashes with the Byzantines. Michael I interpreted the retreat as a victory, describing it as 'according to God's providence', and encouraged a counter-attack.

The Byzantines again summoned an army gathered from all themes of their empire, including the guards of the Syrian passes. Due to unrest in the army, the campaign was delayed but left from Constantinople in May. The departure was marked by a public gathering, with the population of the city, including the Empress Prokopia, accompanying the troops outside the city wall. They gave presents to the military commanders (strategoi) and invoked them to guard the Emperor and fight for the Christians.

== Battle ==
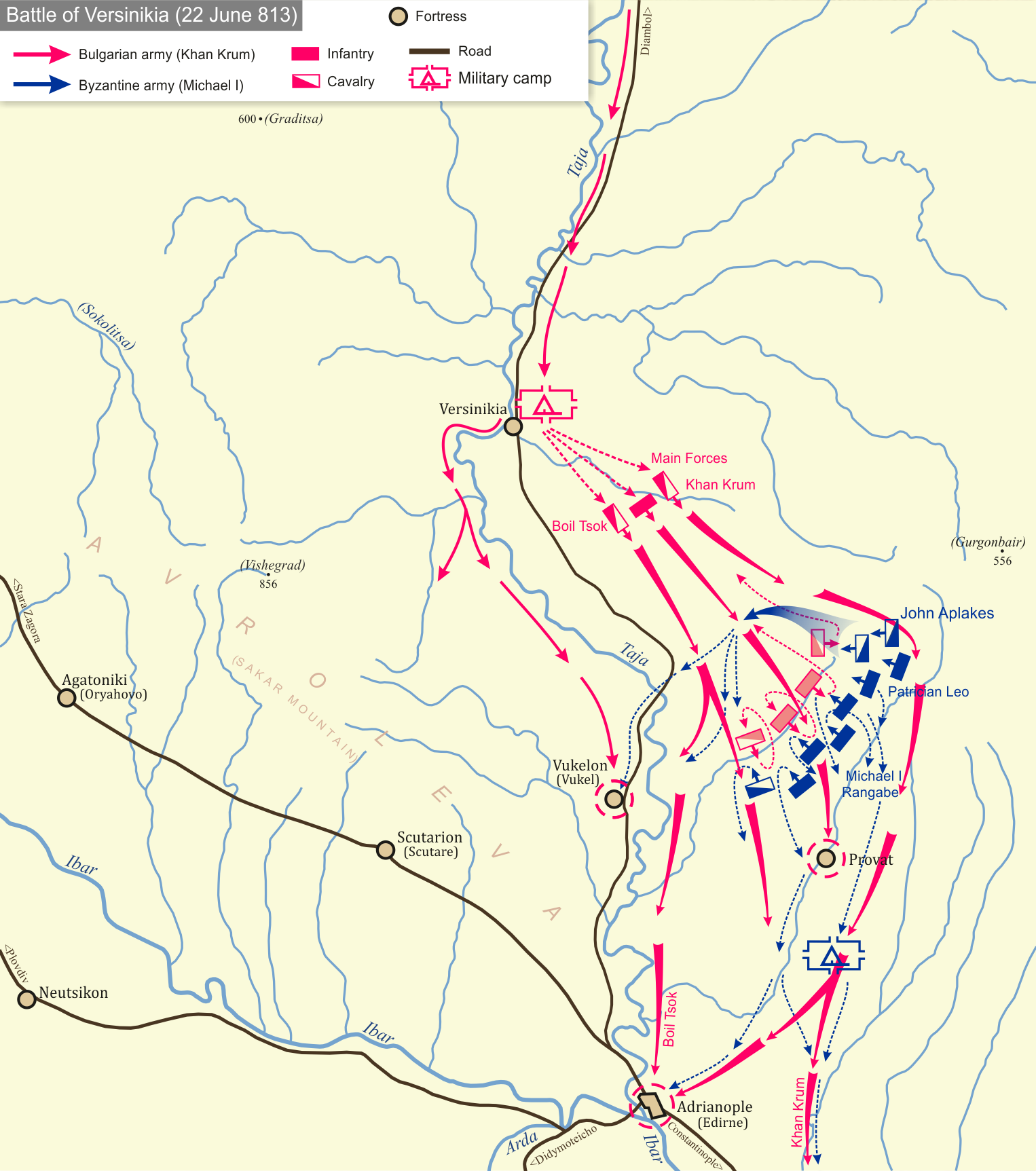
Development of the battle of Versinikia.

The Byzantine army marched to the north, but did not try to take back Mesembria. On 4 May, a solar eclipse frightened the Byzantine soldiers, damaging their morale. They encamped in the vicinity of Adrianople, where the army plundered local settlements. In May, Khan Krum also went to Adrianople. In June both armies set their camps close to each other near the small fortress of Versinikia to the north of Adrianople. John Skylitzes, in Synopsis Historian, stated that the Byzantine army was 10 times larger than the Bulgarian hosts. As a result, the Bulgarians adopted a defensive position. Despite their numerical advantage and greater logistical resources, the Byzantine army did not engage the enemy. Both armies waited for thirteen days in the Thracian summer. Eventually, the Byzantine commanders decided to go on the offensive. Some commanders advocated for an attack, and on 22 June the strategos of Macedonia, named John Aplakes, addressed Michael and said, "How much are we going to wait and die? I will attack first in the name of God and you will follow me bravely. And victory shall be ours because we are ten times more than them [the Bulgarians]."

General Ioannes Aplakes, leading the Byzantine right flank, initiated combat against the Bulgarian left flank. It managed to inflict casualties to the Bulgarian left flank and push it back, but the Byzantine center and left did not engage in the battle, thus leaving Aplakes’ attack unsupported. When Krum saw the inaction among the Byzantine center and left he took action. Krum ordered a second line of Slavic infantry to engage Aplakes' contingent while a unit of Bulgar horse archers and heavy cavalry attacked both flanks of Aplakes' contingent. The Anatolian theme was the first to withdraw, followed by the entire army. The soldiers of Aplakes were left behind and most of them perished, including their commander. When the Bulgarians saw that the enemy, which had been in the higher positions, was retreating, they suspected a trap at first. They also did not expect to achieve success and thus did not chase them at first. But when the Bulgarians were certain that the enemy was fleeing, their heavy cavalry rushed after the Byzantines. Some of them perished during the flight; others hid in different fortresses, some of which were taken by the Bulgarians, and the rest managed to reach Constantinople. Among the first of the commanders to withdraw were Emperor Michael I Rangabe and Leo the Armenian. The Bulgarians took the Byzantine camp which included gold and weaponry.

The later Byzantine chronographers Genesius and Theophanes Continuatus accused Leo the Armenian of being primarily responsible for the defeat, claiming that he deliberately ordered the flight of the units that were still not engaged in the battle. Some scholars, including J.B. Bury and Steven Runciman, support this view, while others, such as Vasil Zlatarski and some Greek scholars, dispute Leo's responsibility, citing alternative accounts, pointing to an alternative story that Genesius and Theophanes Continuatus also included in their texts.

== Aftermath ==
The victory at Versinikia further weakened the Byzantine position and gave the Bulgarian Kanasubigi an opportunity to launch attacks in the vicinity of the Byzantine capital itself. It also sealed the fate of Michael I Rangabe who was forced to abdicate and withdraw to a monastery. The Byzantine throne was taken by Leo V the Armenian (813–December 820) who was known for his firm leadership and decisive actions. He immediately took hasty precautions for the defense of Constantinople because he expected a Bulgarian assault.

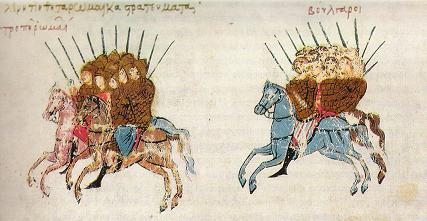
The Bulgarians defeat the Byzantine army at Versinikia.

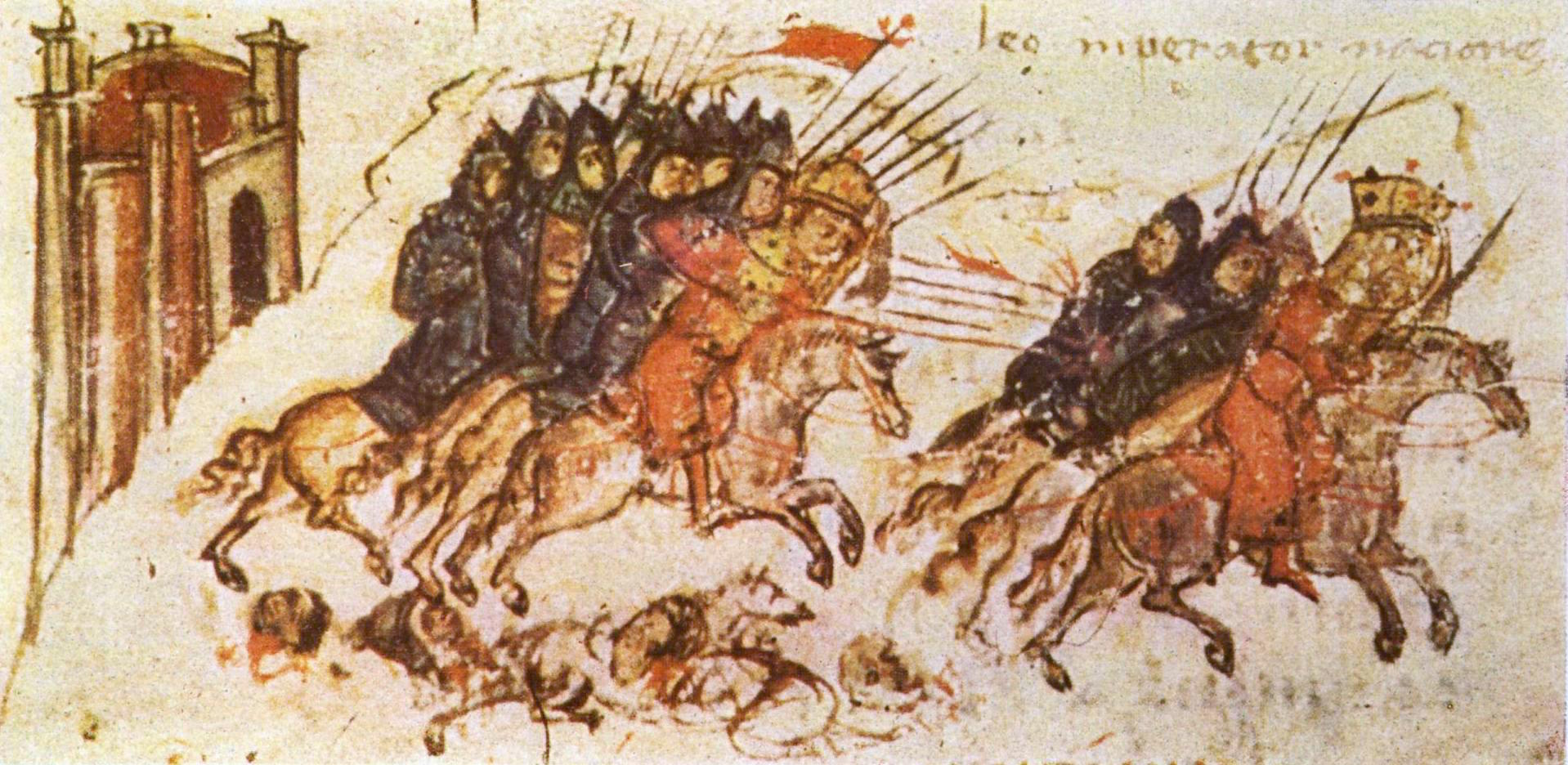
The battle of Versinikia from the 14th century Bulgarian copy of the Manasses Chronicle.

The way to Constantinople was clear and the Bulgarian army headed to the city without resistance. There were still several fortresses in Thrace which remained in Byzantine hands, particularly Adrianople which was besieged by Krum's brother. On 17 July 813 Krum himself reached the walls of Constantinople and set his camp without hindrance. Within sight of the citizens of Constantinople, Krum who was also the high priest, made a sacrifice to the Bulgar god Tangra, performed some pagan rituals, built trenches along the city's walls, and offered peace.

Leo V agreed to negotiations, but he intended to kill Khan Krum and eliminate the threat over the Byzantine Empire. During the negotiations, the Byzantines fired arrows on the Bulgarian delegation. This killed some of them, including the kavkhan and other high officials, but Krum himself remained unscathed.

In response to the Byzantine attack on the delegation, Krum ordered all churches, monasteries, and palaces outside Constantinople to be destroyed, the captured Byzantines were slain and the riches from the palaces were sent to Bulgaria on carts. Next, enemy fortresses in the surroundings of Constantinople and Marmara Sea were seized and razed to the ground. The castles and settlements in the hinterland of Eastern Thrace were plundered, and the region suffered significant destruction. Krum later returned to Adrianople and strengthened the besieging forces. With the help of mangonels and battering rams he forced the city to surrender. The Bulgarians captured 10,000 people who were resettled in Bulgaria across the Danube.

== Location of the battle ==
The exact location of the Versinikia fortress is unknown. According to Theophanes, the fortress was situated 60 km (around 37.3 mi) from Michael Rangabe's camp at Adrianople. At that distance to the north lies the village of Malomirovo, where an ancient Bulgarian inscription from the reign of Khan Krum was discovered. The inscription describes the division of the Bulgarian army during the campaign in 813, noting that the left flank, under kavkhan Irtais, was concentrated along the coast at Anchialus (Pomorie) and Sozopol, while the right flank's headquarters were in the area of Beroe (Stara Zagora) under the command of the ichirgu-boil Tuk. Some scholars suggest that the center of the army, under the personal command of Krum, was located near the contemporary town of Elhovo, close to Malamirovo. Some scholars also theorize that the Byzantine army positioned itself along the Derventski Heights, near the modern Bulgarian-Turkish border.
