= Karnobat =

Karnobat Карнобат
- Town
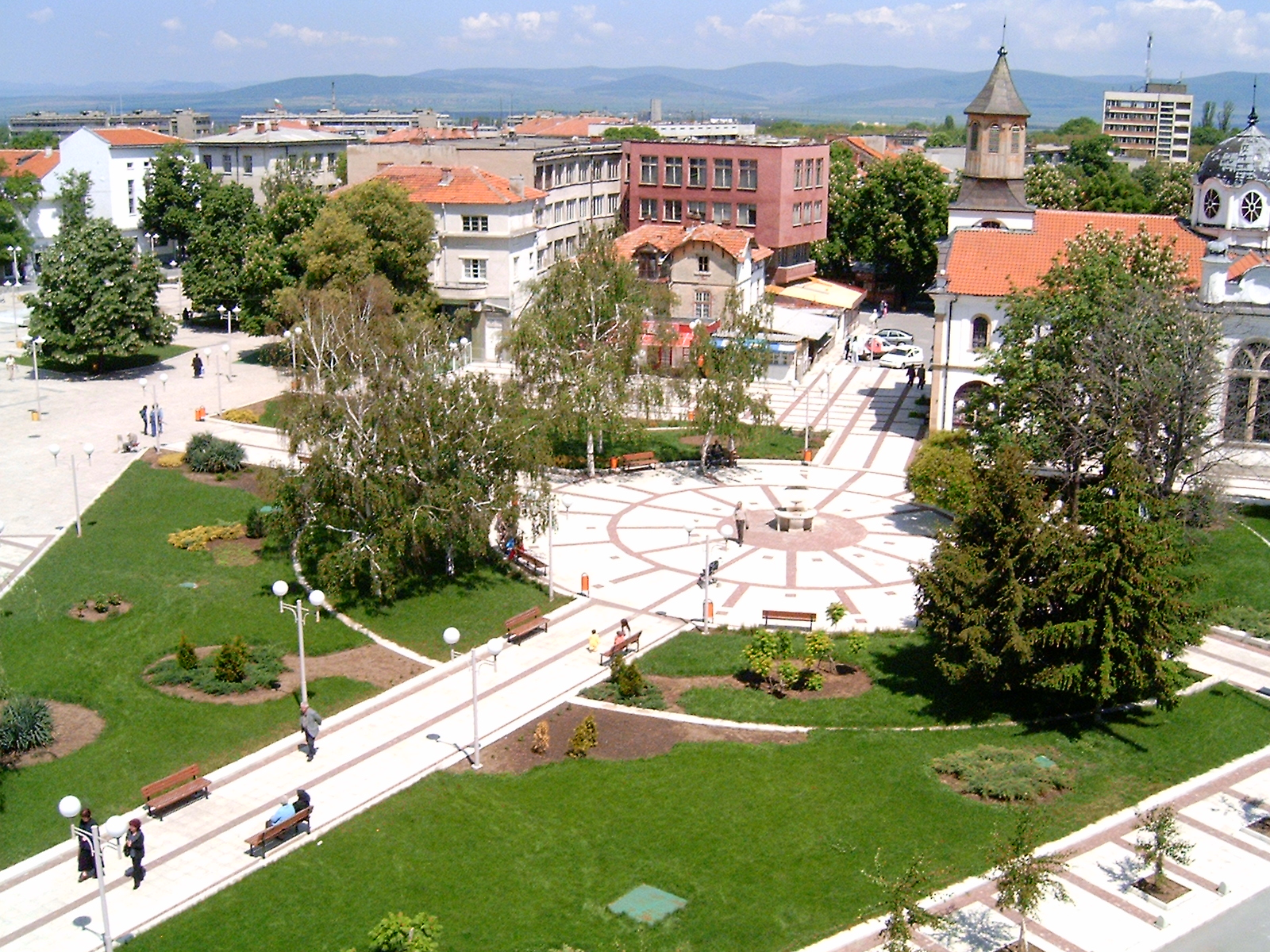
- A view of central Karnobat

- Location of Karnobat
- Coordinates: 42°38′N 26°59′E
- Country: Bulgaria
- Province (Oblast): Burgas

Government
  - Mayor: Georgi Dimitrov
- Elevation: 262 m (860 ft)

Population (2023)
  - Town: 14,886
  - Urban: 22,464
- Time zone: UTC+2 (EET)
  - Summer (DST): UTC+3 (EEST)

Karnobat (Bulgarian: Карнобат [kɐrnoˈbat]) is a town in the Burgas Province, Southeastern Bulgaria. It is the administrative centre of the homonymous Karnobat Municipality and lies in the Karnobat Valley. According to the 2021 census, the town had a population of 16,483.

== Geography ==
Karnobat municipality is situated in the southeastern part of Bulgaria, and it falls within the administrative boundaries of Burgas Province. It lay in the Karnobat Valley. The Karnobat-Aitos range of the Balkan Mountains is located in the northern part of the municipality. The Rish Pass across the Balkan Mountains links the municipality to northern Bulgaria. The Hisar Heights raise to the south of the town of Karnobat. The territory of Karnobat municipality is 806 km^{2} (311 sq mi), 87.37% of which is agricultural land, 9.81% forest land and 2.82% residential areas.

== History ==
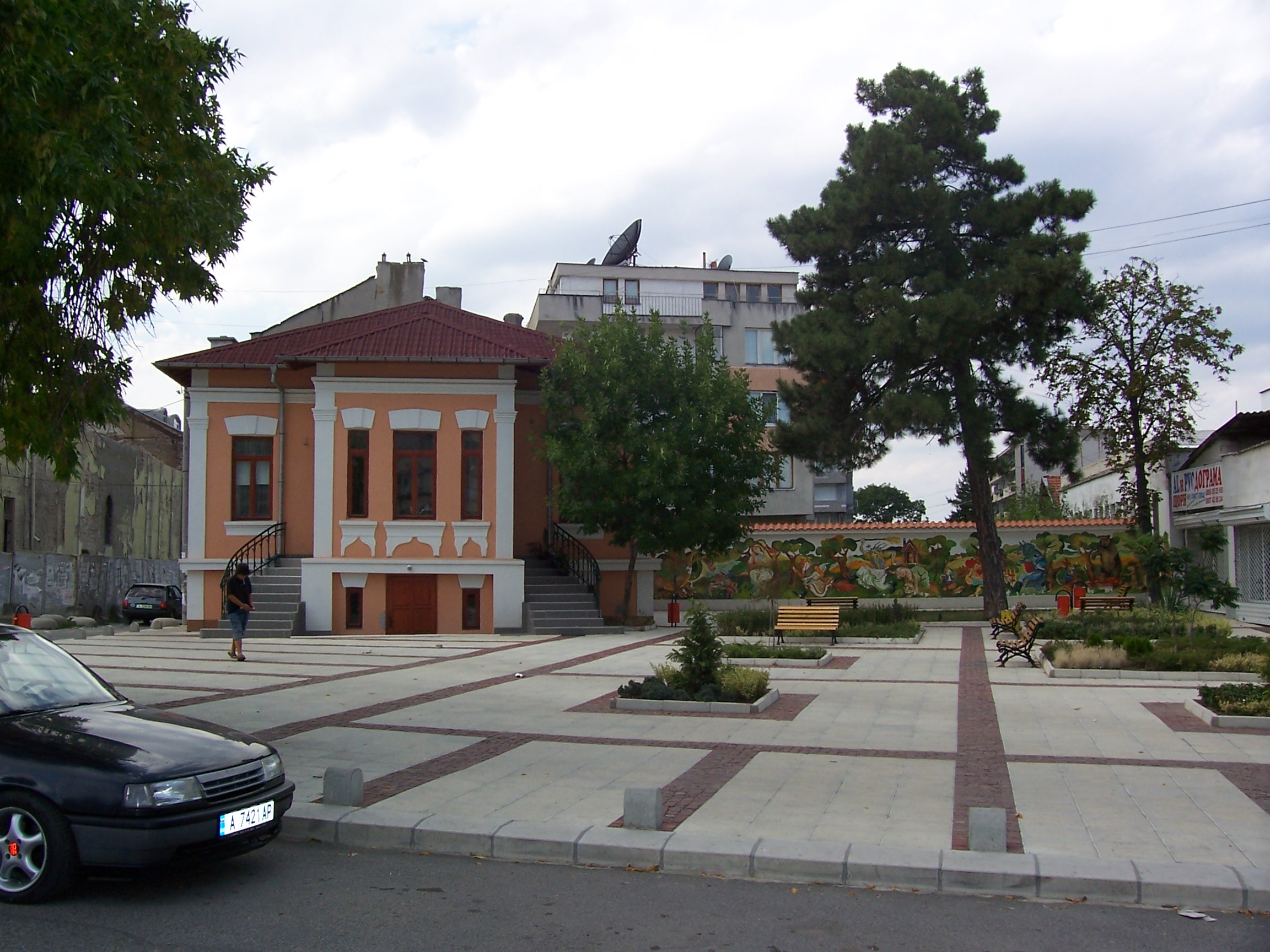
The children's library.

The Karnobat region, located in front of the south approaches of the Rishki and Varbishki passes, features an ancient history, dating back to the Neolithic era. Villages and tumuli reveal traces of life from the Neolithic and the Iron Age, rich settlement life during the antiquity and Middle Ages.

The first information for Karnobat was written in 1153 and included in The Geography by Muhammad al-Idrisi— Arabic traveller and scientist. The historical sources show that since the 19th century up to present days the town has always been an administrative, economic and commercial centre with a traditional yearly fair.

The town of Karnobat was mentioned under different names in the documents from the Turkish registers and travel notes: Karinovassa. Karinabad, Karnovo...

After the foundation of the Bulgarian state in 681, because of its exceptional role, the lands of the Karnobat region were field of many battles of the Byzantine–Bulgarian wars. The Markeli fortress, an Episcopal and military center, located 7.5 km west of Karnobat, has been the most significant place of interest since the times of the First Bulgarian Empire. During the Ottoman rules, the town was an important administrative and trade center included in the Silistra district. The fact that the Bulgarian priest Stoiko Vladislavov (known as Sophronius of Vratsa, one of the prominent men of the Bulgarian National Revival performed the service in Karnobat parish is indicative of the revival processes that took place in the region from 1791 to 1792.

During the Revival period Karnobat became the rallying point for cultural and educational development of the region. St. Yoan Theologian Church was built in 1838. Razvitie Reading Club, (now St. Kiril i Metodii Reading Club), one of the first reading clubs in South-Eastern Bulgaria was established in 1862 and a non-clerical school was opened in 1864.

The town had a significant contribution to the religious struggles during the Renaissance. In the 19th century the citizens of Karnobat expelled the bishop of Anhialo and so eliminated the Greek influence.

During the Russian-Turkish War (1877–1878), the region became a victim of bashi-bazouks and Circassians.

The Liberation of Karnobat on 24 January 1878 gave grounds for huge social and economic reforms. The town strengthened its positions as a cultural and educational center. About 22 periodicals reflect its new appearance.

Between 1953 and 1962 the town was named Polyanovgrad (Bulgarian: Поляновград) after the socialist poet Dimitar Polyanov, who was born there.

== Population ==
According to the data of the carried out census of the population on 4 December 1992 the constant population in Karnobat municipality has been 33,117, and in the end of 2009 it was 26,576. From the period since 1985 up to now the population has constantly decreased. Basically this is due to the migrations and the worsen age structure in some of the villages in the municipality—Devetintsi, Kozare, Dobrinovo, San Stefano. In the process of the mechanical movement major part of the migrating population has been oriented to the municipal centre and a small part of the municipality.

== Residential areas ==
Karnobat municipality includes in its administrative territory totally 30 residential places – 1 town and 29 villages, with a total population of 26,576 persons as of December 2009, 18,480 of which live in the municipal centre – the town of Karnobat. Among the villages only Ekzarh Antimovo is with a population over 1000 people. With a population of 500 to 1000 people are the villages of Iskra, Krumovo, Gradishte, Klikach and Nevestino. The rest villages are with a population under 500 persons. With population under 100 people is only the village of Kozare. The residential area is 22.74 km^{2} (8.78 sq mi), which represents 2.8% of the municipal territory 806 km^{2} (311.20 sq mi). Housing areas of 9.445 km^{2} (3.65 sq mi) cover 41.5% of the fund. The lands in the residential areas under cultivation and used for private industry are 8.377 km^{2} (3.23 sq mi) (36.8%).

The average population density of is 1400 people per square kilometer, or average 710 m^{2} (7,642.38 sq ft) of residential territory per a resident. Only two of the villages are with indexes which are near to the average for the municipality. The typical density of residence is up to 10 people/ha gross density of residence.

== Museums ==
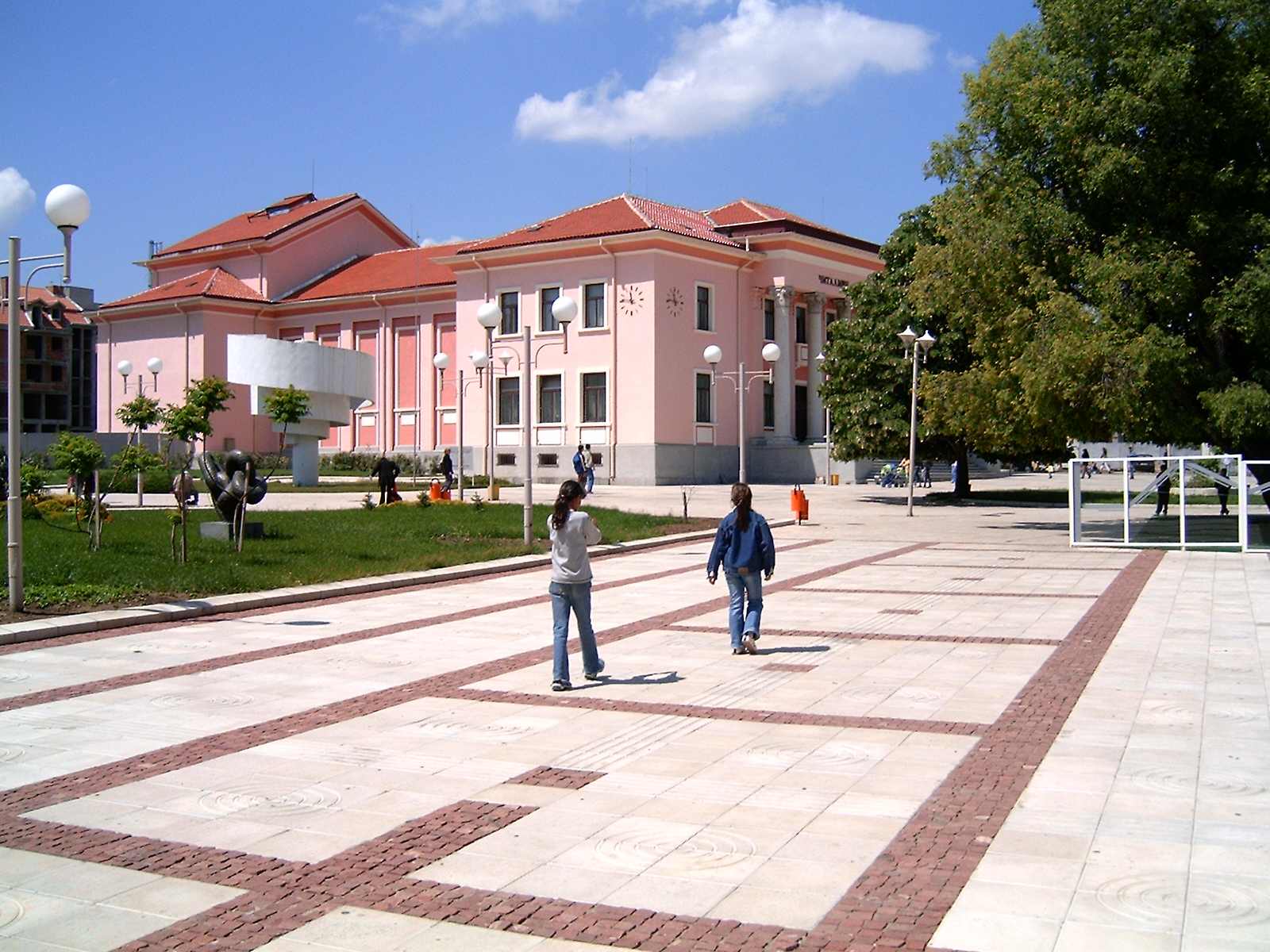
The chitalishte of Karnobat

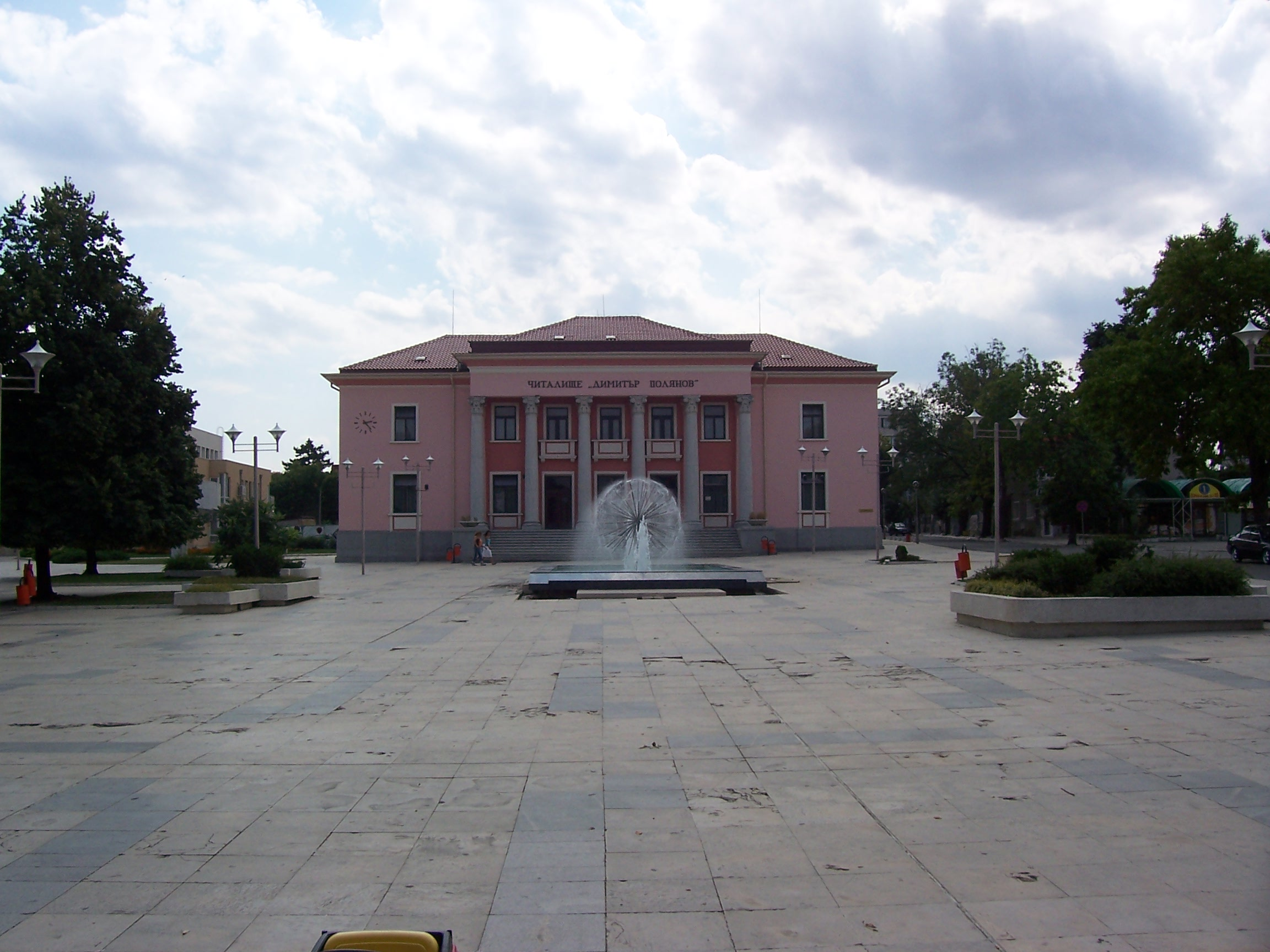
The central square

The museum house “Dimitar Polyanov” is the only preserved and reconstructed renaissance house, built in the 1870s. The museum exhibition has been established on 23 November 1973 and possesses a fund, which contains belongings, documents, works and letters of the writer D. Polyanov, born in the town of Karnobat, as well as property of his family, necessities of life. In the museum and in the nearby located and recently constructed similar house exhibition of the ethnographic way of living in the region and of the famous authors from the town is in a process of establishment.

The historical museum in the town has been established in 1921 as an archeological collection. Its creator is the explorer with many years of service, a principal of the local high school Atanas Ignatiev Karaivanov. Since 1953 it has become a state museum with three departments – "Archeology", "Ethnography" and "New History". In 1992 "Nature" department has been established as well. It is located in a separate building in the southern park in the "Dimitar Polyanov" has a born in Karnobat. The cultural club hall is with 310 seats and the movie hall beside it – with 460 places. To the cultural club, there is an amateur mixed choir with about 50 singers, which in 1992 celebrated 90 years since its establishment. In 1993 a cultural club ensemble for folk songs and dances has been established as well. Recently the variety and satiric ensemble to the cultural club celebrated 75 years of its establishment. Within the days of the traditional annual May festivals of culture the municipal folk festival is held as well.

=== Festivals ===
- National Thracian Folklore Festival – in May
- National Alternative Cinema Festival – in September.
- Karnobat Town Festival – 26 September.

=== Historical landmarks ===
- Medieval fortress Markeli – situated 7.5 km (4.7 mi) to the west of the town on a hill by Mochuritsa river. The archeological excavations, which have started in 1986 have found a medieval basilica from 6th century, an ancient Bulgarian church from 10th century, a Byzantine church from 11th century. The medieval town has been an important strategic centre from a military point of view as well as a commercial and economic centre with a key role in the earlier history of the Bulgarian-Byzantine relations. Here is the place of the victorious battle of khan Kardam against the Byzantines.
- Sinabey Hamam – a Turkish public bath in the south (ancient) part of the town of the last quarter of 15th century. It is one of the most ancient entirely preserved buildings in South Bulgaria.
- The Clock Tower – it is near the public bath and has been built in 1874 as a town symbol of the Revival of the prosperous commercial crafts centre.
- Kosten Church – 20 km (12.4 mi) to the north of Karnobat, in the village of Kosten, with a preserved architectural style of the Revival and an interesting mystically religious stone plastic arts. The nearby bust-sculpture of the famous Bulgarian man from the Revival Sofronii Vrachenski connects the church with an interesting event of his life since the end of 18th century, when he has serviced in Karnobat parish still as a priest Stoyko Vladislavov.
- St. John Theologian church – built up after 1878 by Tryavna master Gencho Kanev. It impresses with original architectural elements and its wood-carved iconostasis, prepared by masters from Debar school, which is second of importance in South Bulgaria after the iconostasis in the church “St. Virgin Mary” in Pazardzhik. The church feast is in the day of its patron saint.
- The mosque – built in 1821.
- The Jewish graveyard – a Jewish necropolis 1 km. to the south of the town, with one of the richest in Bulgaria plastic arts and written information for the Jewish colony.

== Notable citizens ==
Creative artists, born in Karnobat with a certain contribution to national culture include:

- Dimitar Polyanov (4 November 1876 – 25 September 1953) – a poet, a writer, a translator, an editor, a creative artist of significant importance for the Bulgarian literature.
- Bencho Obreshkov (27 April 1899 – 8 April 1970) – an artist, educated in the Artist's academy, a person nominated with the most prestigious Bulgarian and international rewards.

== Educational centres ==
=== Children's centres ===
12 kindergarten, 2 united children's centres and 2 full day kindergarten, which are visited by 680 children function in the municipality.

There are 2 secondary schools of general education, 2 secondary professional schools, 7 primary and 3 elementary schools, one inter school centre, where about 4200 pupils study on the territory of the municipality. The pedagogical personnel in the municipal schools is 368 persons, and the non pedagogical one – 151persons.

The technical college of agricultural mechanization is directly subordinated to the Ministry of Agriculture and Forests and it prepares specialists of secondary education for occupation in agriculture. The college of clothing prepares technologists and tailors who can find a job in the companies which function in the municipality. In the secondary schools of general education there is a specialized language education and a four-year education of managers.

In a demographic aspect the number of children constantly decreases, which leads to a reduction in the number of classes and closing down of the schools. This requires a new attitude of the municipality toward the management of the released municipal property.

=== Scientific institutes ===
The only scientific research institute for barley, in the country is established in 1925. It is located in the municipality, researches and implements new Bulgarian sorts of barley and winter common wheat. Scientific researches of genetics, selection and seed growing, ecology and vegetation protection, on problems of crop-rotation, fertilizing and soil processing are held.

Concerning stock-breeding an experimental bases established where new types are originated and are given for breeding stock of the type “Karnobat fine-fleeced sheep”.

== Honour ==
Karnobat Pass on Livingston Island in the South Shetland Islands, Antarctica is named after Karnobat.
