= Chatalar inscription =

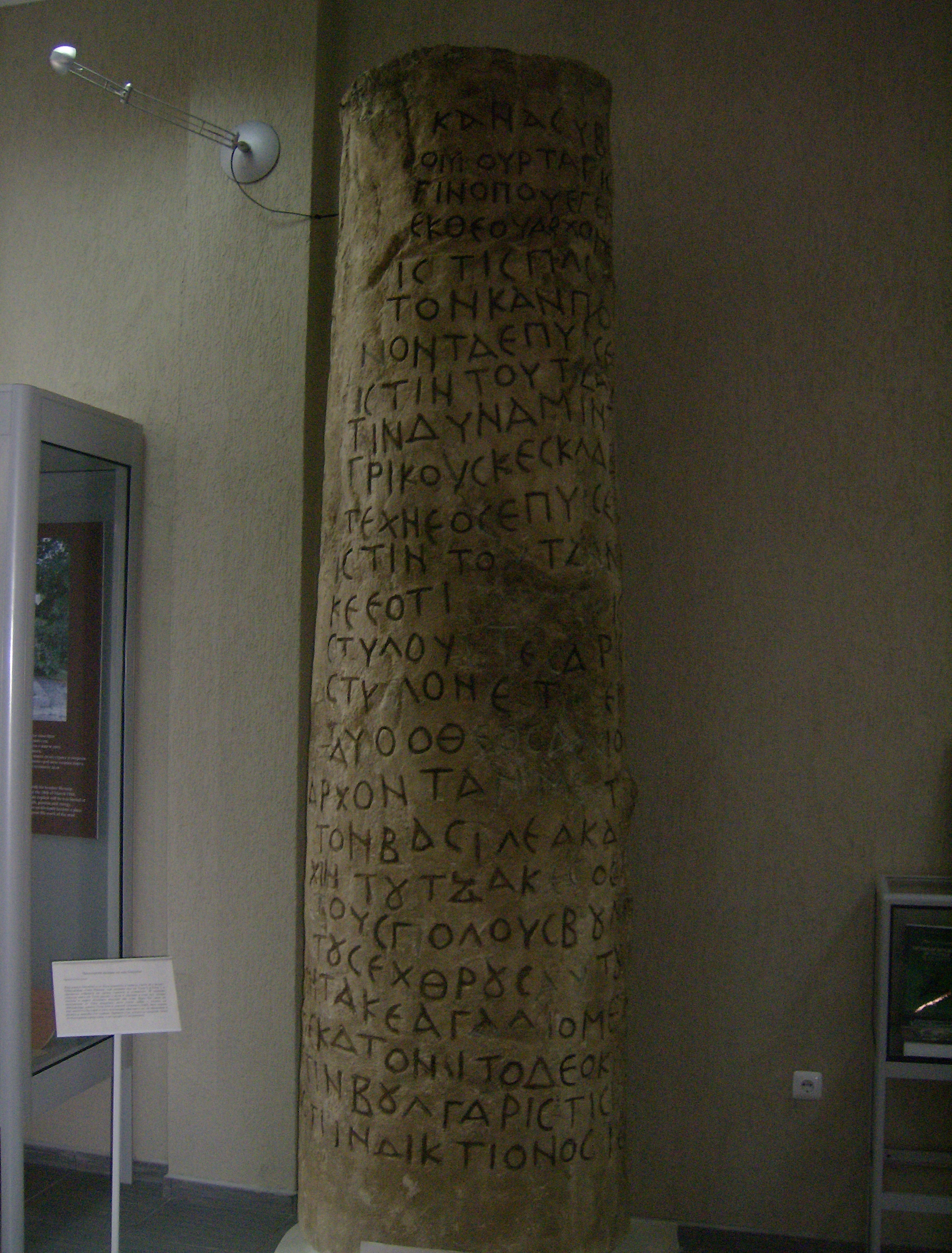
Copy of Chatalar Inscription in Pliska Museum

The Chatalar Inscription is a medieval Greek inscribed text upon a column in the village of Chatalar (modern Han Krum, North East Bulgaria) by the Bulgarian ruler Omurtag (815-831). It was unearthed in 1899 by the archaeologists Fyodor Uspensky, M. Popruzhenko, Vasil Zlatarski and Karel Škorpil.

== Text and translation ==
Original text
ΚΑΝΑCYΒΙΓΙ ΩΜΟΡΤΑΓ ΙC ΤΙΝ ΓΙΝ ΟΠΟΥ ΕΓΕΝΙΘΙΝ ΕΚ ΘΕΟΥ ΑΡΧΟΝ ΕCΤΙ ΙC ΤΙC ΠΛCΚΣΑC ΤΟΝ ΚΑΝΠΟΝ ΜΕΝΟΝΤΑ ΕΠΥΗCΕ ΑΥΛΙΝ ΙC ΤΙΝ ΤΟΥΝΤΖΑΝ ΚΕ ΜΕΤΙΓΑΓΕΝ ΤΙΝ ΔΥΝΑΜΙΝ ΤΟΥ ΙC ΤΟΥΣ ΓΡΙΚΟΥC ΚΕ CΚΛΑΒΟΥC ΚΕ ΤΕΧΝΕΟC ΕΠΥΗΣΕ ΓΕΦΥΡΑΝ ΙΣ ΤΙΝ ΤΟΥΝΤΖΑΝ ΜΕ ΤΟ ΑΥΛΙΝ ΣΤΥΛΟΥΣ ΤΕΣΣΑΡΙC ΚΕ ΕΠΑΝΟ ΤΟΝ CΤΥΛΟΝ ΕCΤΙCΕ ΛΕΟΝΤΑC ΔΥΟ Ο θΕΟC ΑΞΙΟCΙ ΤΟΝ ΕΚ ΘΕΟΥ ΑΡΧΟΝΤΑ ΜΕ ΤΟΝ ΠΟΔΑ ΑΟΥΤΟΥ ΤΟΝ ΒΑΣΙΛΕΑ ΚΑΛΟΠΑΤΟΥΝΤΑ ΕΟC ΤΡΕΧΙ Η ΤΟΥΝΤΖΑ [---- ΚΕ ΕΟΣ ΤΟΥC ΠΟΛΛΟΥC ΒΟΥΛΓΑΡΙC ΕΠΕΧΟΥΝΤΑ ΤΟΥC ΕΧΘΡΟΥC ΑΥΤΟΥ ΥΠΟΤΑCΟΝΤΑ ΧΕΡΟΝΤΑ ΚΑΙ ΑΓΑΛΙΟΜΕΝΟC ΖΙCΙΝ ΕΤΙ ΕΚΑΤΟΝ ΙΤΟ ΔΕ ΚΕ Ο ΚΕΡΟC ΟΤΑΝ ΕΚΤΙΣΤΑΝ ΒΟΥΛΓΑΡΙCΤΙ CΙΓΟΡ ΕΛΕΜ ΚΕ ΓΡΙΚΙCΤΙ ΙΝΔΙΚΤΙΟΝΟC ΙΕ

English translation
Kanasubigi Omortag, in the land where he was born is lord (archon) by God. In the field of Pliska staying he made an aul (aulis) at [the river] Ticha (Kamchiya) and moved his forces against the Greeks (i.e. Byzantines) and the Slavs and skillfully erected a bridge at Ticha together with the camp [he put] four columns and above the columns he erected two lions. May God grant the Lord by God to trample with his foot the Emperor (Basileus) as long as Ticha flows... and over the many Bulgars to rule, to subjugate his enemies, to live in joy and happiness for a hundred years. The time when this was built was in Bulgar Shigor Elem and in Greek Indiction 15.

== See also ==
- Palace of Omurtag
- Bulgar calendar
- Omurtag's Tarnovo Inscription
