= Vicina (town) =

Former town in Northern Dobruja, in Romania

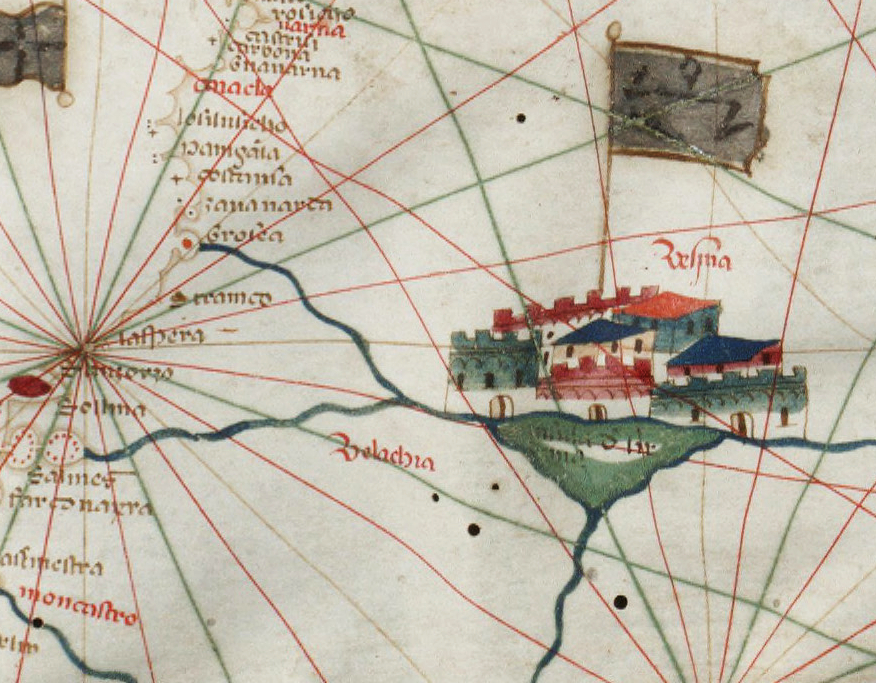
The port of Vicina in Northern Dobruja as shown on a portolan of Petrus Roselli

Flag of Vicina, according to the Book of All Kingdoms

Vicina was a town on the Danube used as a trading post by the Republic of Genoa, being part of the Genoese trade empire between the 13th and 14th century. At one time, it was the most flourishing port of the maritime Danube, but its importance declined with the development of other ports such as Kilia and Brăila. Although many locations have been proposed by both historians and archeologists as the remains of Vicina, it is still unknown where this town was located.

== Early history ==
The earliest reference to Vicina (Greek Βιτζίνα, Bitzina) is found in the Alexiad, written in 1148 by Anna Comnena, which described events from late 11th century. She mentions that it was ruled by two Pecheneg chieftains, Sesthlav and Satzas. Soon, trade flourished and Vicina was named a rich town by an Arab traveler.

In the 12th century, the Arab geographer al-Idrīsī called the town Disina.

== Trade ==
The Mongol conquests led to a period of peace and stability (the so-called Pax Mongolica) which favored trade. Within the Black Sea region, merchants from Venice and Genoa were active, with the Venetians using existing towns as their tradeposts, while the Genoese preferred to create their own towns. Following the Treaty of Nymphaeum (1261), the Genoese gained the priority in the trade in the region.

The Genoese bought cereals, wax, fish and hides (which were produced in the Danubian regions and the Mongol-ruled steppes) and sold manufactured products such as Lombard cloth and linen, as well as spices, servicing the territories of Wallachia and Moldavia even before the founding of the states, as well as the Knyazate of Halych.

The town of Vicina, like other Genoese towns, was overseen by a consul.

== Decline ==
At the end of the 14th century, Vicina was under Byzantine control, and according to a document from 1337–1338, it was ruled by "infamous heathens", presumably Mongols, Turks or Tatars. Soon after that, another document noted the rise and fall of the metropolis of Vicina, as Vicina was "plagued by barbarians" and had only a few Christians. In 1359, the Metropolitan Hyacinth of Vicina moved to Argeș with the approval of the Ecumenical Patriarch of Constantinople.

The commerce of Vicina was severely affected during the Genoese-Byzantine war of 1351–1352. After the war, the Byzantines lost the control of the Lower Danube to the Genoese, who gained control over the town of Kilia (today Chilia Veche, Romania) The decline of Vicina also led to the rise of another port on the Danube, Brăila, which became the largest port on the Danube in the region. This was also helped by the political stability within Wallachia, whereas Vicina was caught in fights between Mongols and Bulgarians, later also with the Turks.

== Location ==
The exact location of Vicina is not yet known and it's a matter of debate among historians and archeologists. Portolan charts place it right after Drinago (which is assumed to be modern Brăila), south of the Danube. Based on this, many historians identified it with Isaccea, while archeologists identify it with Păcuiul lui Soare. In the "Book of Knowledge of All Kingdoms...", written during the 14th-century, the location of Vicina is described thus: "I departed from the kingdom of Menseber and went along the shore of the Mare Mayor to a great city called Vecina. Here nine rivers unite, and fall into the Mare Mayor. They call the first Turbo, the second Danubio, the third Dacia, the fourth Drinago, the fifth Pinga, the sixth Raba, the seventh Rabesa, the eighth Ur, the ninth Vecine. These nine rivers make a great commotion before this city of Vecina which is the capital of the kingdom. It has a white flag with four red squares." Over time, historians identified it with a variety of places:

- Isaccea: Nicolae Grămadă, Nicolae Bănescu, Gheorghe Moisescu, Ştefan Lupşa, Alexandru Filipaşcu, Constantin C. Giurescu
- Between Isaccea and Tulcea: Nicolae Iorga
- Niculițel: Constantin Brătescu
- Păcuiul lui Soare: Petre Diaconu
- Mahmudia: Gheorghe I. Brătianu
- Hârșova-Topalu area: Octavian Iliescu
- Vidin: Constantin N. Hurmuzaki
- Măcin: Wilhelm Tomaschek, Konstantin Jireček, Nicolae Dobrescu, J. Bromberg
- Nufăru: Georgi Atanasov
- somewhere in Albania: Alexandru D. Xenopol
