= Holy Forty Martyrs Church, Veliko Tarnovo =

SS. Forty Martyrs Church
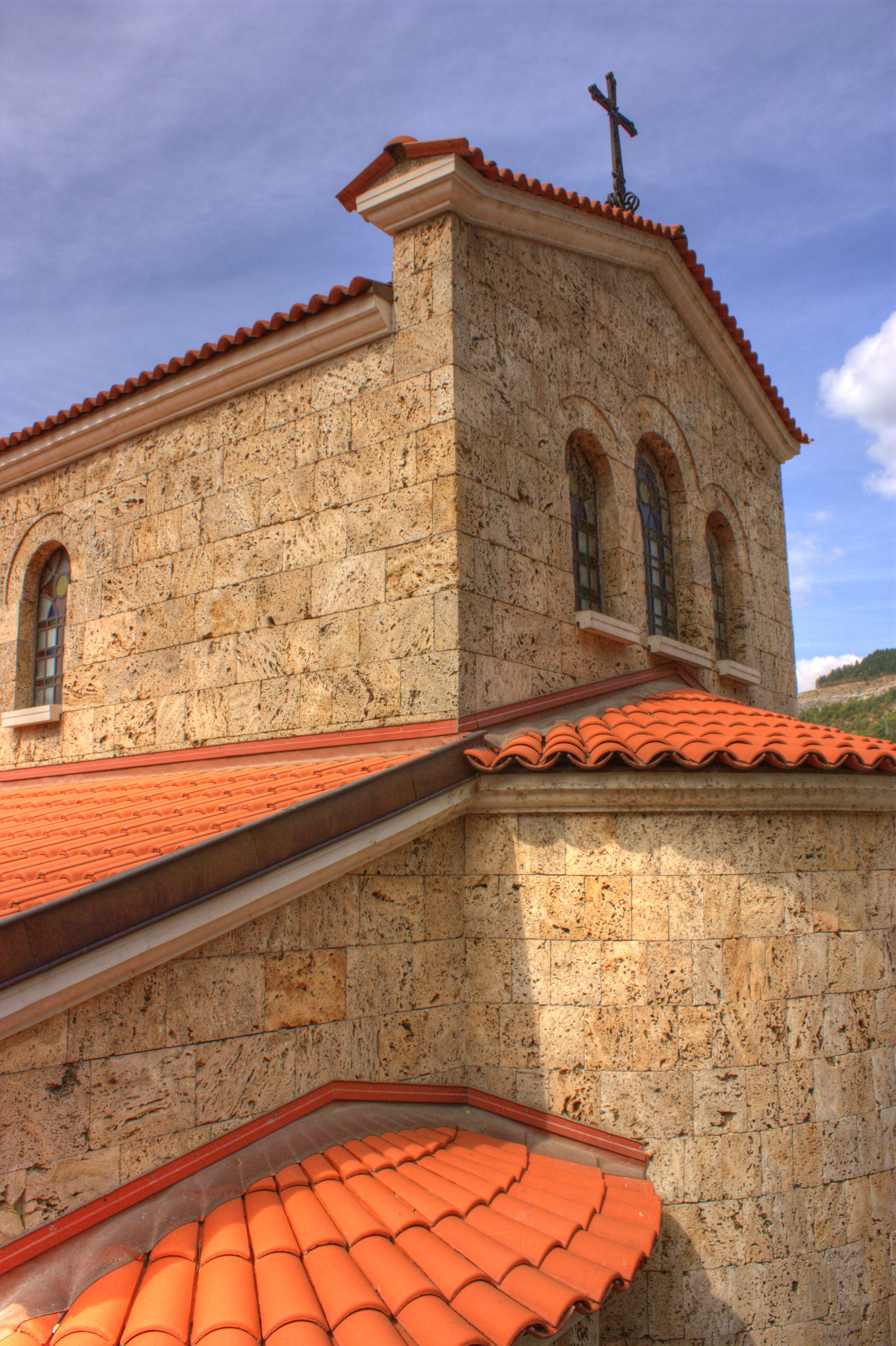
- SS. Forty Martyrs Church
- 43°5′4″N 25°39′0″E
- Country: Bulgarian
- Denomination: Eastern Orthodox

History
- Founded: 1230

The Holy Forty Martyrs Church (Bulgarian: църква "Св. Четиридесет мъченици", tsarkva "Sv. Chetirideset machenitsi") is a medieval Eastern Orthodox church constructed in 1230 in the town of Veliko Tarnovo in Bulgaria, the former capital of the Second Bulgarian Empire.

The Holy Forty Martyrs Church, an elongated six-columned basilica, has three semicircular apses and a narrow narthex from the west. Another building was added later to the west side of the church. The church interior was covered with mural paintings probably in 1230. On the western addition some of the outer decoration survived, revealing the traditional arches and coloured small ceramic plates inserted into the wall. It is not clear if the church has frescoes painted on the outer walls.

The church contains some of the Bulgarian Empire's most significant historical records, including Omurtag's Column, Asen's Column and the Border Column from Rodosto from the rule of Khan Krum. The columns of Khan Omurtag and Khan Krum are written in the Greek language. The inscription of the column of Krum "Fortress of Rodostro" has been turned upside down. The inscription of Omurtag is about the building of a new glorious palace on the Danube river, but its location is unknown. The second part of the inscription is a legacy for following generations to remember the deeds of Omurtag. These columns were placed in the church by Ivan Asen II as a tribute to his mighty ancestors.

== History ==
The church, dedicated to the Forty Martyrs of Sebaste, was built and painted on the order of Bulgarian tsar Ivan Asen II in honour of his important victory near Klokotnitsa over the Despotate of Epirus under Theodore Ducas on 9 March 1230. The name of the church came naturally as the battle took place on the day of the feast of Holy Forty Martyrs of Sebaste. A royal church during the reign of Ivan Asen II, it was the main church of the Great Lavra monastery at the foot of Tsarevets on the left bank of the Yantra River.

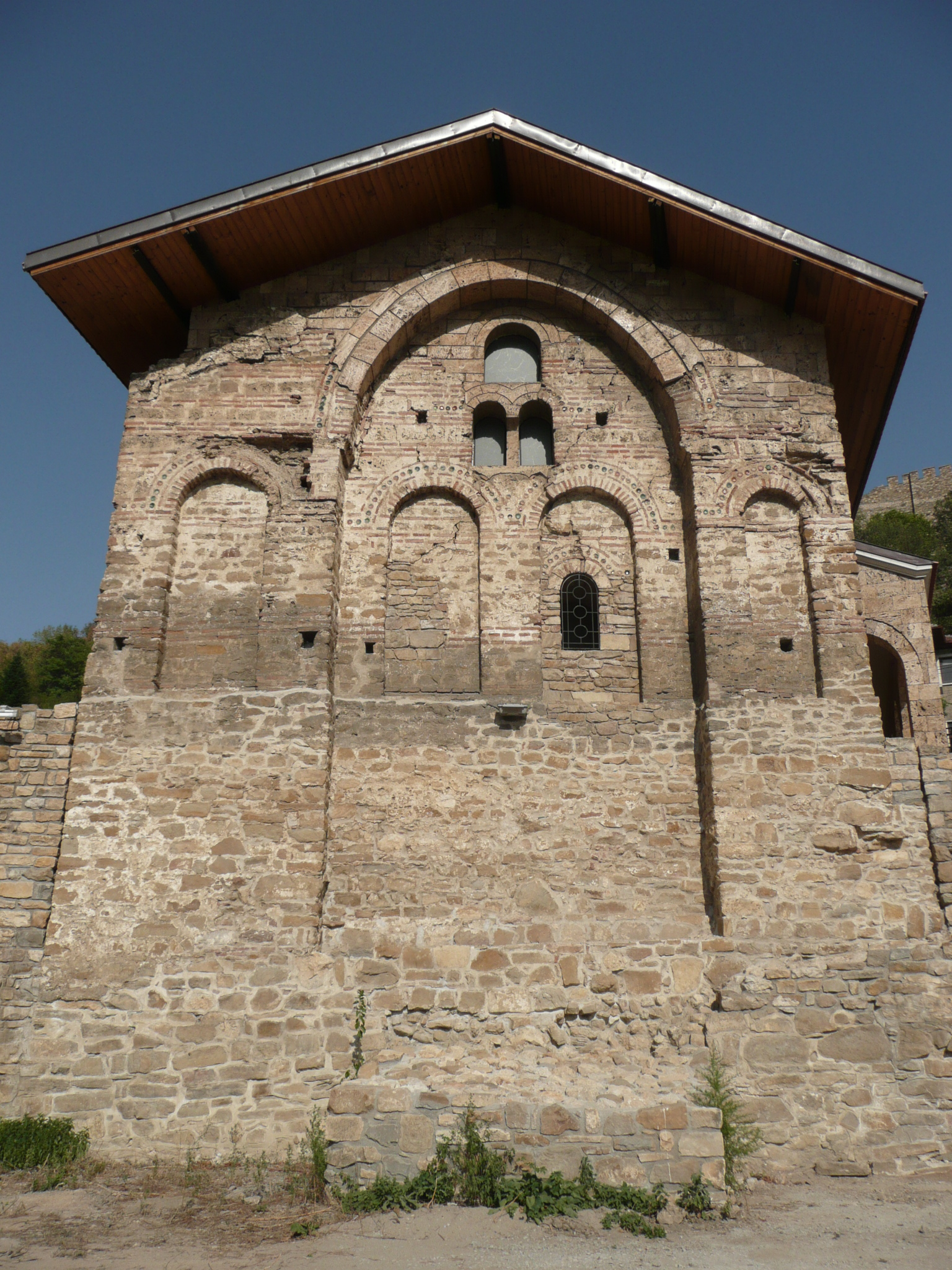
SS. Forty Martyrs Church - the Western façade viewed from the bank of Yantra river

Saint Sava, the most important saint of the Serbian Orthodox Church, was first buried in the church after he died on 14 January 1235 or 1236 during a visit to Tarnovo, but his relics were moved to Serbia on 6 May 1237.

In the first years of Ottoman rule, the church preserved its Christian character, possibly until the first half of the 18th century. It was then converted to a mosque, with the mural paintings, the icons and the iconostasis being destroyed and alterations being made to the structure itself in 1853. Only a limited number of paintings are preserved, primarily from the northern half of the narthex's west side.

Archaeological research on the church began as early as the 1850s, but excavations were first made in 1906 and 1914, after it was badly damaged by an earthquake in 1913.

Systematic archaeological research of the church started in 1969. In 1972, a royal burial of a 1.9 m-tall accoutred man was excavated that included a massive (61.1-gram) gold ring bearing a heraldic image and the inscription Kaloyanov prasten (КАЛОꙖНОВ ПРЪСТЕНЪ, "Kaloyan's ring") in negative (see photo). After extensive reconstruction works, the Holy Forty Martyrs Church was fully renovated in the 2000s and opened once again to the public, with an official inauguration on 14 September 2006. The church's modern look greatly resembles its medieval structure. Following the church's reconstruction, it has been used as the burial place for the remains of Bulgarian emperors and nobility, among whom Kaloyan of Bulgaria.

The Forty Martyrs Church was also the location of then-Prime Minister of Bulgaria Stefan Stambolov's lavish wedding to Polikseniya Kostaki Stanchova on 18 May 1888. The full independence of Bulgaria from the Ottoman Empire was proclaimed by Tsar Ferdinand on 22 September 1908 in the church.

== Burials ==
- Kaloyan of Bulgaria, Tzar of Bulgaria
- Anna Maria of Hungary, Empress consort of Bulgaria
- Ivan Asen II of Bulgaria
- Anna (Anisia)
- Irene Komnene Doukaina
- Irene Doukaina Laskarina

== Gallery ==
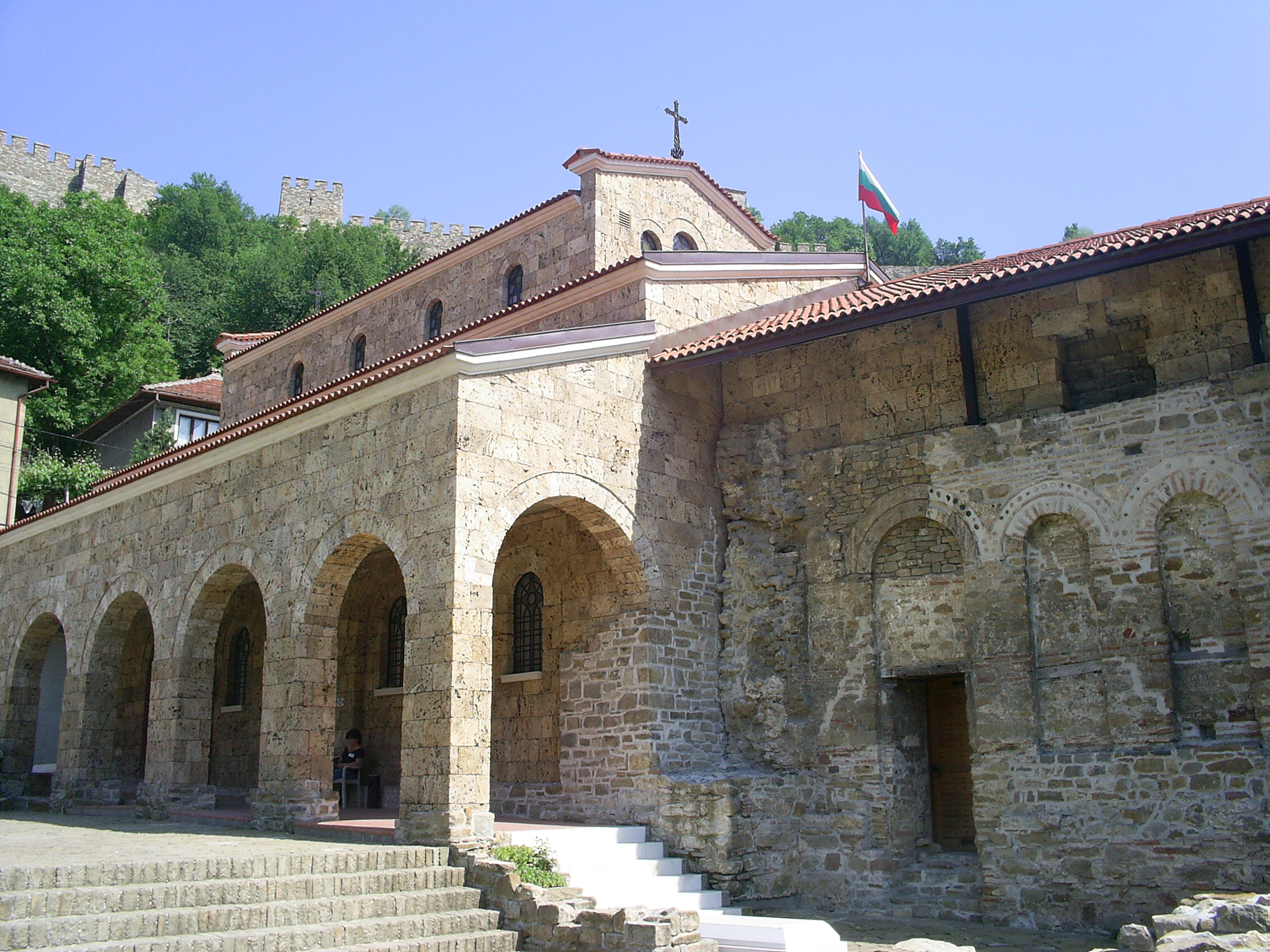
Exterior

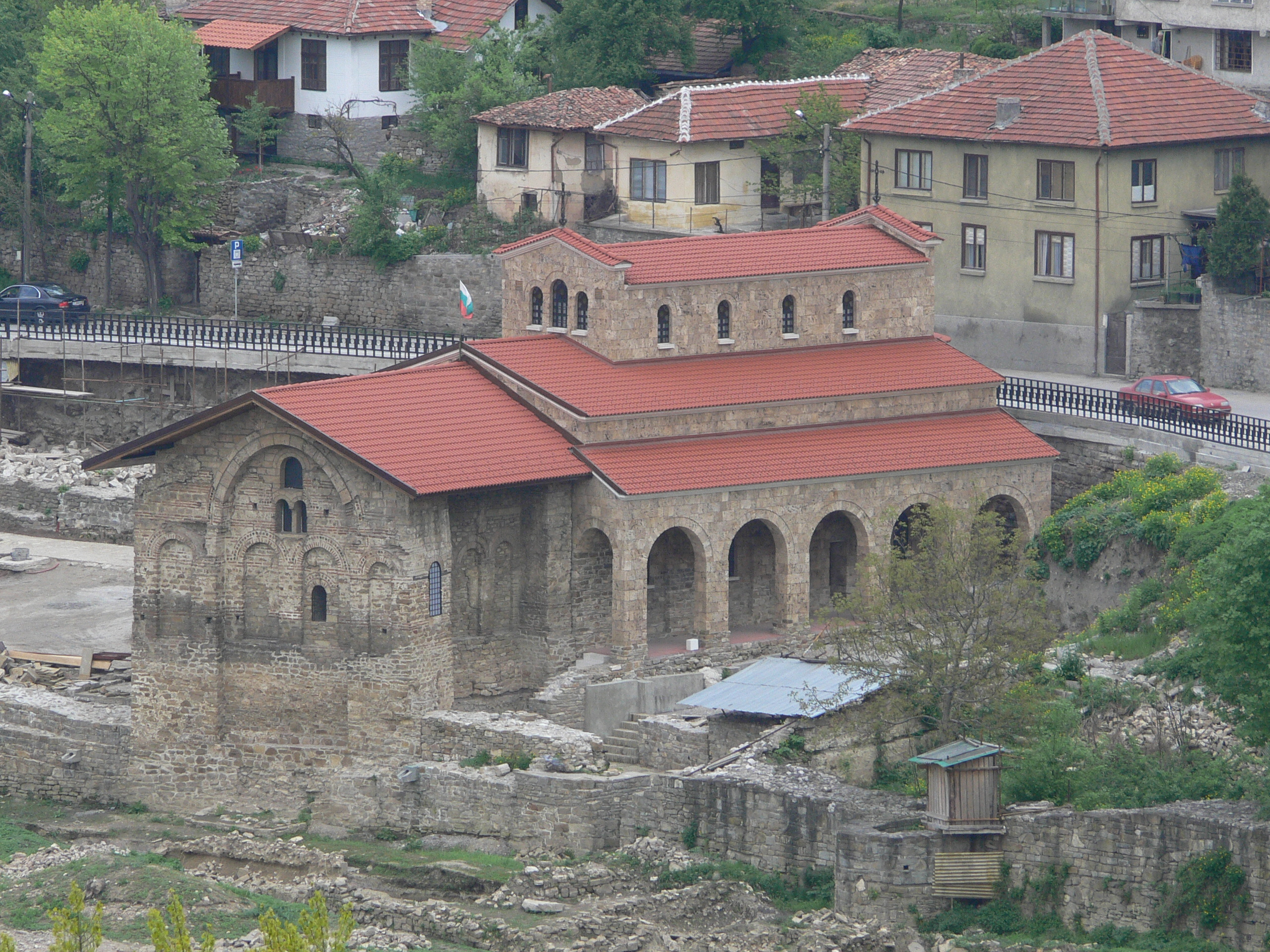
Exterior

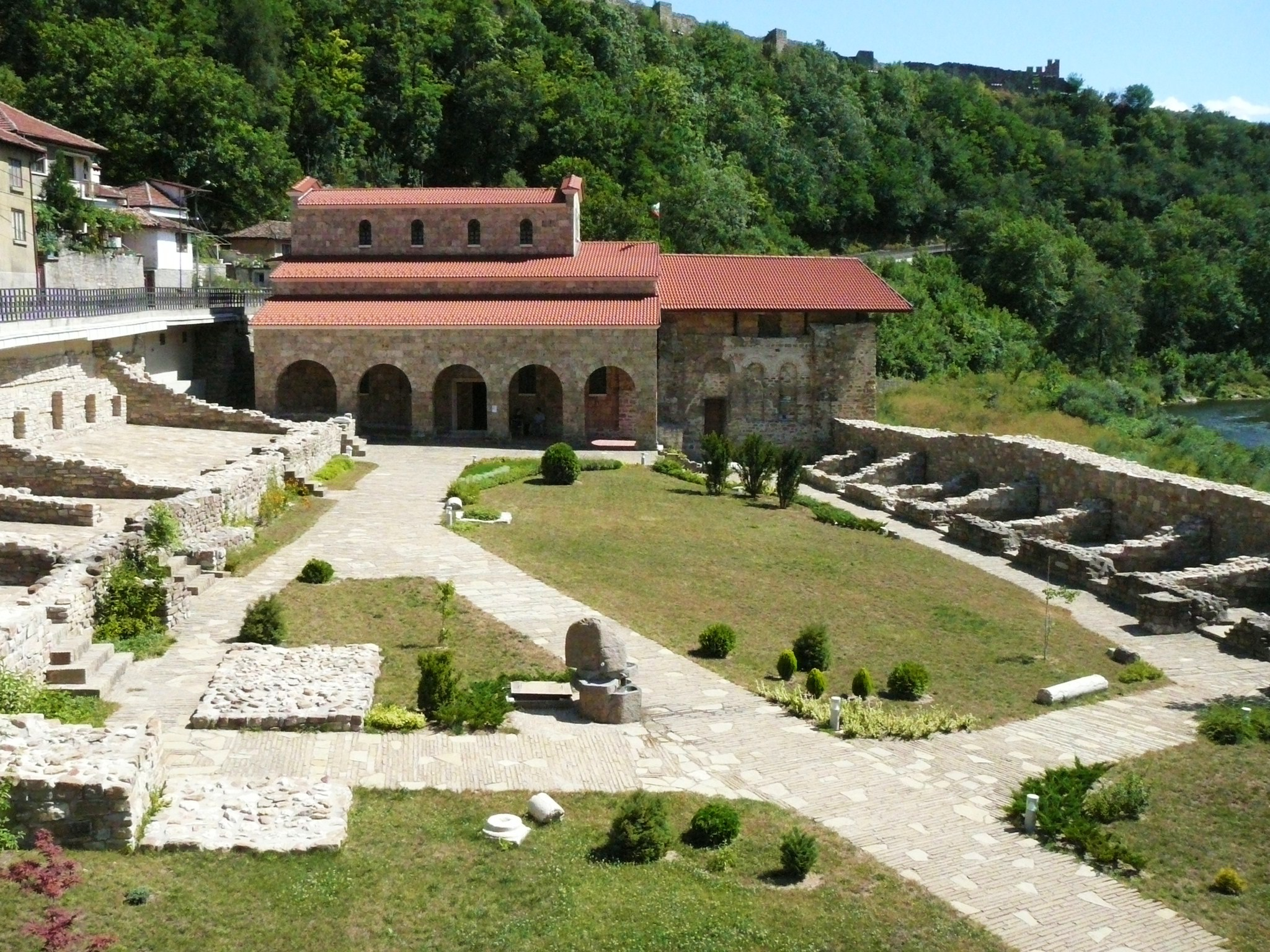
Exterior

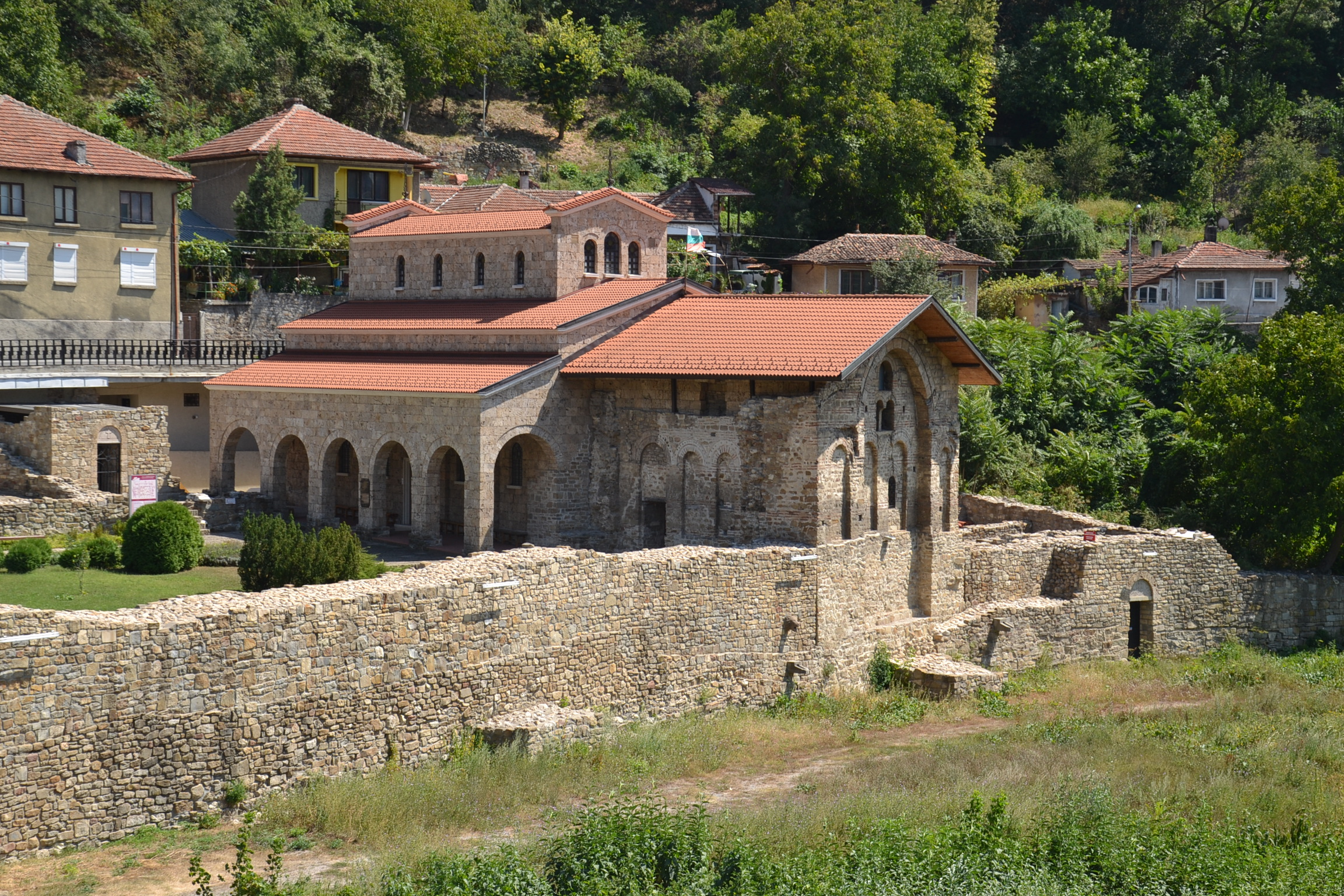
Exterior

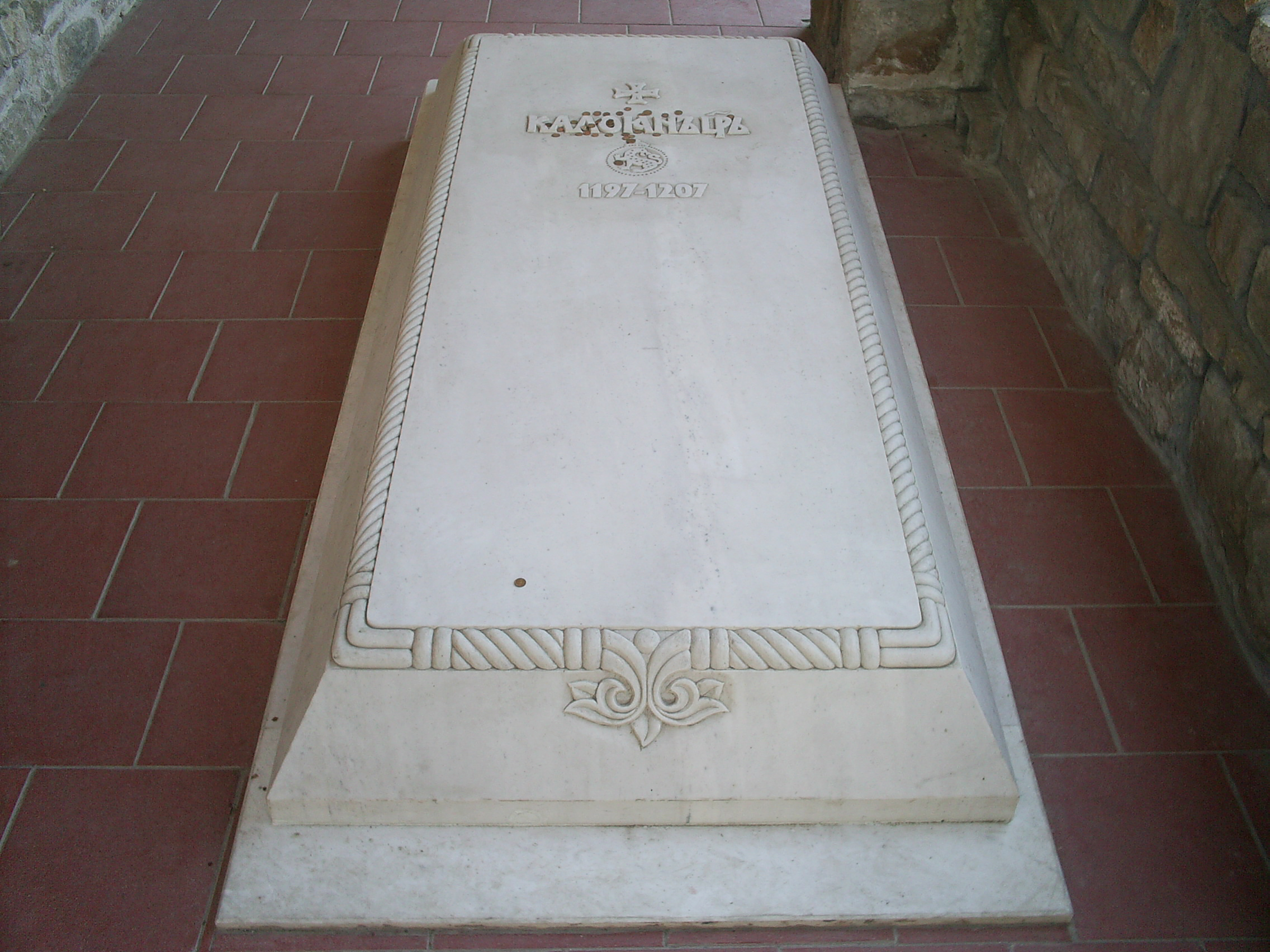
Sarcophagus of Kaloyan of Bulgaria

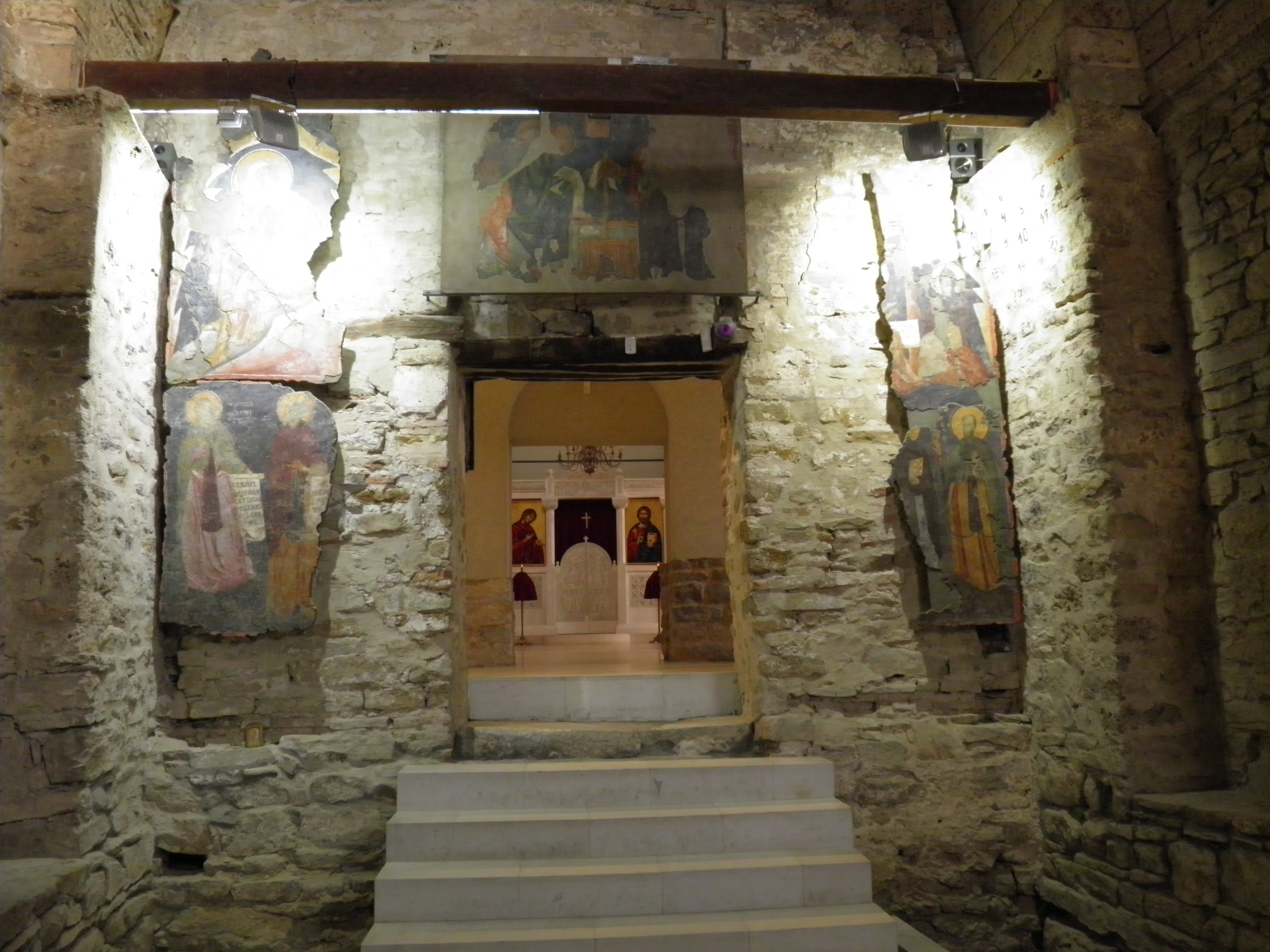
Holy Forty Martyrs Church

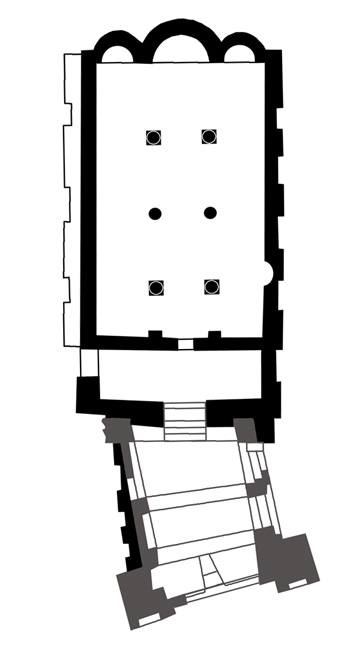
Plan of the Church
