= Bulgar calendar =

Solar calendar system used by the Bulgarians

The Bulgarian calendar was a solar calendar system used by the Bulgars, who from the 4th century onwards dwelt in the Eurasian steppes north of the Caucasus and around the banks of river Volga. In 681, part of the Bulgarians settled in the Balkan Peninsula and established First Bulgarian Empire. The main source of information used for reconstruction of the Bulgarian calendar is a short 15th century transcript in Church Slavonic called Nominalia of the Bulgarian Khans, which contains 10 pairs of calendar terms. Additionally, the same dating system is used in a marginal note in a manuscript by 10th century monk Tudor Doksov and in the Chatalar Inscription by the 9th-century Bulgaria ruler Omurtag (r. 814–831), who also provides the Byzantine imperial dating equivalent (the indiction). According to the reconstructed calendar, the Bulgars used a 12-year cyclic calendar similar to the one adopted by Turkic peoples from the Chinese calendar, with names and numbers that are deciphered as in Bulgar language. The reading, along with the "cyclic calendar" interpretation itself, was originally proposed by Finnish Slavist Jooseppi Julius Mikkola in 1913. Later, there have been various modifications and elaborations during the 20th century by scholars such as Géza Fehér, Omeljan Pritsak, Mosko Moskov and other scientists.

Reconstructions vary slightly because some of the names are unattested, and the exact form of a few is debatable. The following list is based on Mosko Moskov's and description of the average mainstream interpretation, as well as his own reconstruction, and takes into account the existing disagreements:

Years:

Lists of the Bulgar Khans
The name of the Khan	the clan of him	the year he was born	the year in English
Avitohol'	Doulo	dilom' tvirem'	The ninth month of snake year
İrnik'	Doulo	dilom' tvirem'	The ninth month of snake year
Gostoun'	Ermi	doh's tvirem'	The ninth month of the pig year
Kourt'	Doulo	şegor' veçem'	The third month of the cattle year
Bezmer'	Dulo	şegor' vem'	The tenth month of the cattle year
Esperih	Doulo	vereni alem'	The first month of the sheep/tiger year
Tervel'	Doulo	tekou çitem'	The seventh month of the chicken/ram year
Tvirem'	Doulo	dvan şehtem'	The eighth month of the horse/rabbit year
Sevar'	Doulo	toh altom'	The sixth month of dragon/chicken year
Kormisoş'	Vokil'	şegor' tvirim'	The ninth month of the cattle year
Savineh'	Oukil'	şegor' alem'	The first month of the year of cattle
Telets'	Ougain'	so(s)mor' altem'	The sixth month of the year of weasel
Oumor'	Oukil'	dilom' toutom'	The fourth month of the snake year
The date when Khan Boris made the Bulgarians Christians		yeht' behti	The fifth month of the dog year

== Comparison with Turkic calendars ==
The following comparison table was made based on Omeljan Pritsak's analysis.

Year	Bulgar	Old Turkic (7 – 8 century)	Uighur (13 – 17 century)	Turkmen	Bashkir	Kazakh	Khakaski	Teleut
Mouse	Somor, (čomor)		küskü	сычқан	сысҡан	тышқан	кÿске	қойон „Rabbit“
Ox	Shegor, σιγορ		ud	сығыр	һыйыр „крава“	сиыр	інек	улу „Dragon“
Uncertain, probably Tiger / Wolf	Ver/Vereni, Vereni	bars (Turkic)	bars (Turkic)	барс, пәләң (Turkic)	барыс	барыс	тÿлгÿ „Fox“	йылан „Snake“
Rabbit	Dvan (davlan)	tabïšɣan	tavïšɣan	таушқан	ҡуян	қоян	хозан	ат „Horse“
Dragon		lüi/lü (Chinese)	luu (Chinese)	лу балық	луу	лув	килескі „Lizard“	қой „Ram“
Snake	Dilom (čilom)	yïlan	yïlan	йылан	илан	жылан	чылан	мечин „Monkey“
Horse	Ima (Imen)		yunt, yund	йылқы	илҡы	жылқы	чылғы	ит „Dog“
Ram	Teku, Teke	qony	qoin	қой	ҡой	қой	хой	қақай „Boar“ (Mongolian)
Monkey		bičin	bičin	биҗин	мишин	маймыл, мешін	кіжі „Human/Man“	чычқан „Mouse“
Rooster	Toh (čux)	takïɣu	takïɣu	тауқ	тауыҡ	тауық	таңах	тақаа „Rooster“ (Mongolian)
Dog	Eth	it	it	ит	эт	ит	турна „Crane“	инек „Cow“
Boar	Dohs (čočka)	laɣzïn (?)	toŋuz	тоңуз	доңгыз	қара кейік	öскі „Ram“	пар „Tiger“
