= Palace of Omurtag =

Archeological site in Bulgaria

Coordinates: 43°11′07″N 26°53′54″E

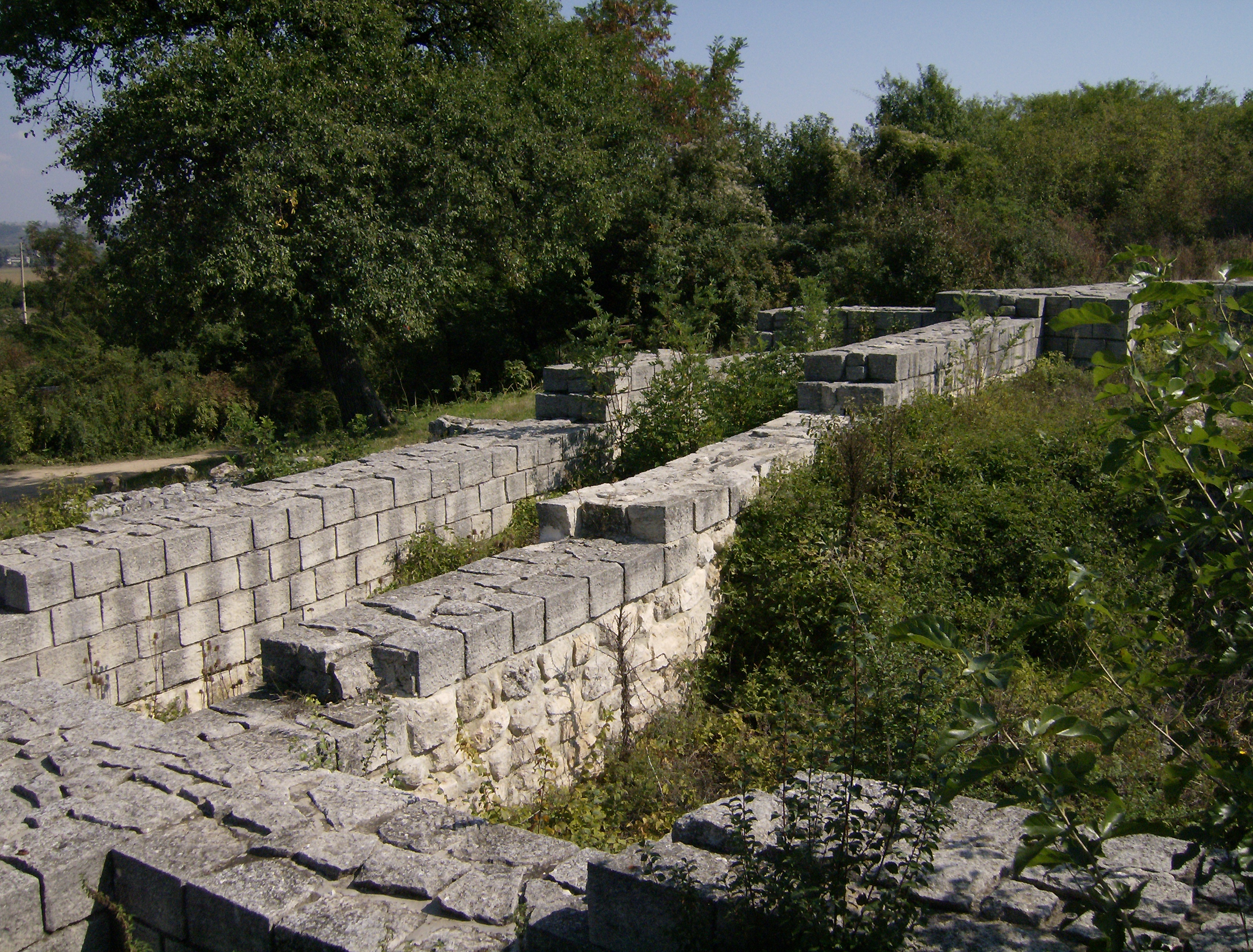
Excavated ruins at the Palace of Omurtag

The Palace of Omurtag or Aul (Aulē) of Omurtag (Bulgarian: Аул на Омуртаг, Aul na Omurtag) is an archaeological site in northeastern Bulgaria dating to Late Antiquity and the Early Middle Ages located near the village of Han Krum in Shumen Province.

The site has been pinpointed as the location of a fort and palace of Omurtag, ruler (kanasybigi) of the First Bulgarian Empire in 815–831, as mentioned in the Chatalar Inscription of 822. Earlier structures in the vicinity of the fortress have been identified as the Arian episcopal see of a Gothic bishop.

== Gothic episcopal see ==
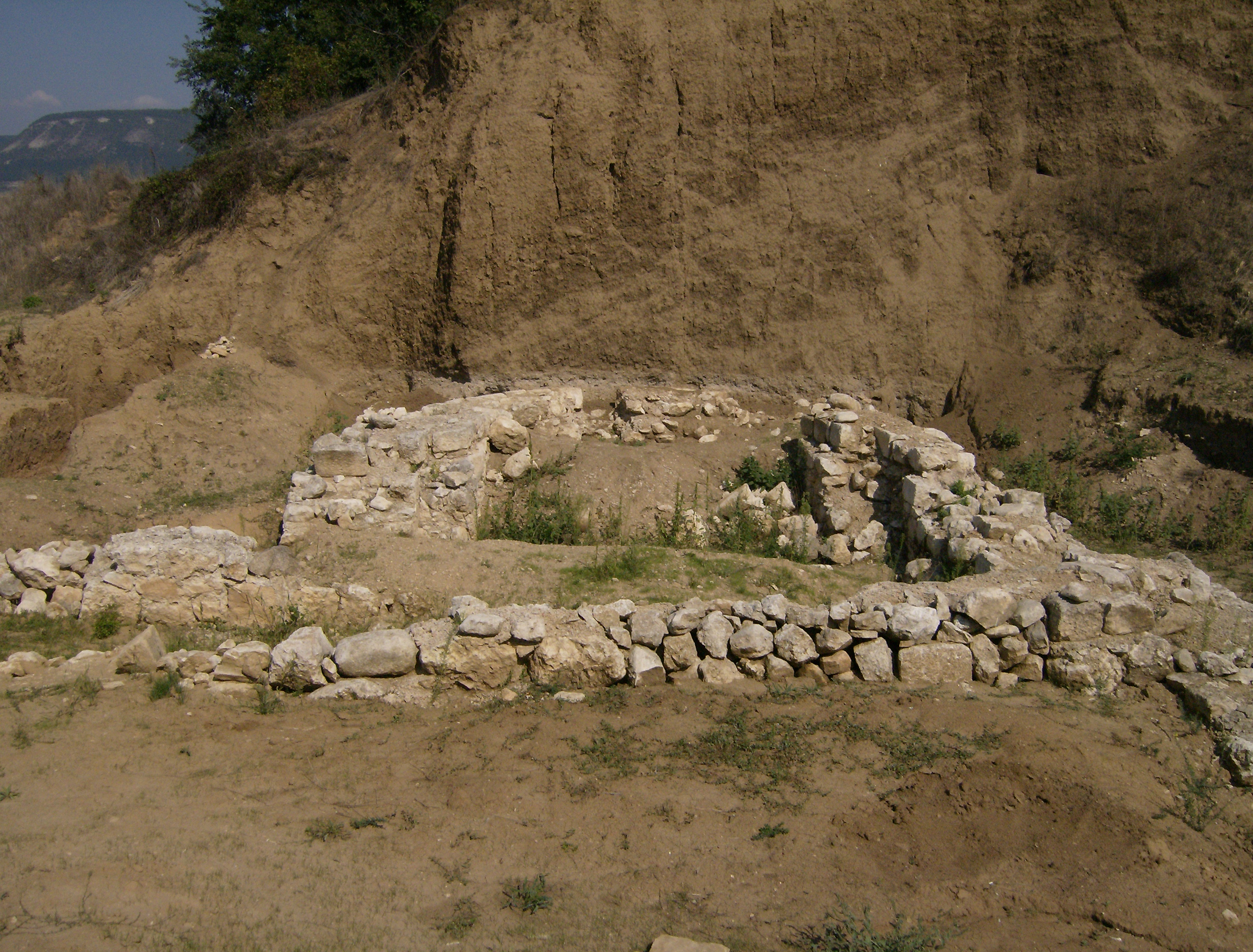
Ruins of the Arian Gothic basilica

The earliest ruins at the Palace of Omurtag site include four churches, two of which built on top of each other; a bath; and fortified walls, all dating to Late Antiquity (roughly 250–650 CE). Three of the churches and the bath lie outside the medieval fortification, while one of the churches and the traces of ancient walls have been excavated within its limits. Archaeologists and scholars link the ancient ruins to the settlement of Arian Gothic foederati in the area, and specifically to the 4th-century Gothic bishop Ulfilas (Wulfila). He was known to have moved to modern northern Bulgaria with his followers, and he translated the Bible into the Gothic language in Nicopolis ad Istrum. It is thought that the four Gothic churches were destroyed during successive Hunnic raids.

A small church unearthed in 1976 has been identified by excavation consultant Todor Balabanov as being a personal church of a high-ranking Goth, possibly Ulfilas. The scarcely preserved layer of Christian frescoes in the church is thought to be the oldest in Bulgaria. Next to this church was built a larger basilica regarded as an Arian episcopal see. The basilica, a nearly square building measuring 29.7 by 26 metres (97 ft × 85 ft), features three naves and a two-winged apse. On top of the basilica's ruins lay an octagonal building, with an apse in the northern part. Balabanov claims this is a mausoleum and likens it to the Mausoleum of Theodoric in Ravenna.

In the 2000s, researchers unearthed several Gothic graves. Artifacts included medical kits, a chain mail, and characteristic Germanic jewellery, including belt buckles and fibulae (brooches) decorated with gold, gemstones and zoomorphic motifs. In one of the graves, researchers found the remains of a woman with the artificial cranial deformation typical for noble persons among the Goths, Sarmatians and Bulgars.

== Bulgarian fort and palace ==
=== History and excavation ===
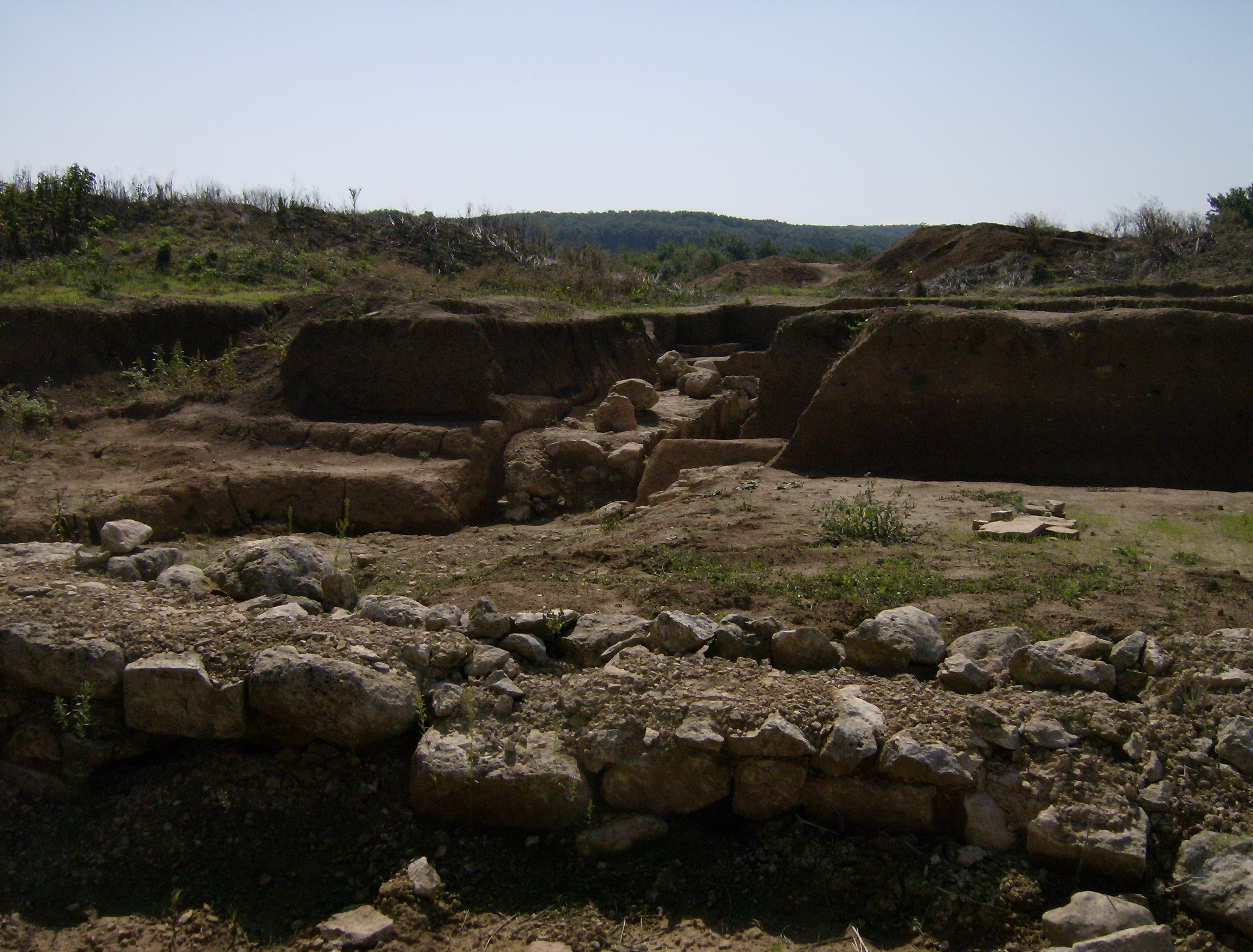
Excavated Bulgarian fortifications

The Chatalar inscription, a Bulgarian epigraph written on a column in medieval Greek, was unearthed in 1905 in the village of Han Krum (then known as Chatalar). The inscription's text indicates that kanasybigi Omurtag built an aulē with four columns topped by two lion sculptures near the Ticha River. Earlier scholars linked that passage with Preslav, the city that would succeed Omurtag's capital Pliska as the ruling centre of the Bulgarian Empire in the end of the 9th century. In modern times, however, Omurtag's aulē has been conclusively proven to be the site at Han Krum, which is much closer to where the epigraph was excavated. While it remains unclear whether the word aulē should be interpreted as the Greek αύλή ("palace, court") or the steppe nomadic aul, a fortified ruling centre, the ruins at Han Krum suitably match the medieval description.

Archaeological research has established that the medieval site at Han Krum was inhabited for more than 150 years, from 822 until the late 10th century, when the fort was razed. This was not the permanent end of its habitation, as new buildings were constructed on top of the ruins. Excavations of the Palace of Omurtag began in 1957, though they were never fully completed. Since 2000, the site has been extensively excavated by Bulgarian and German archaeologists.

=== Architecture ===
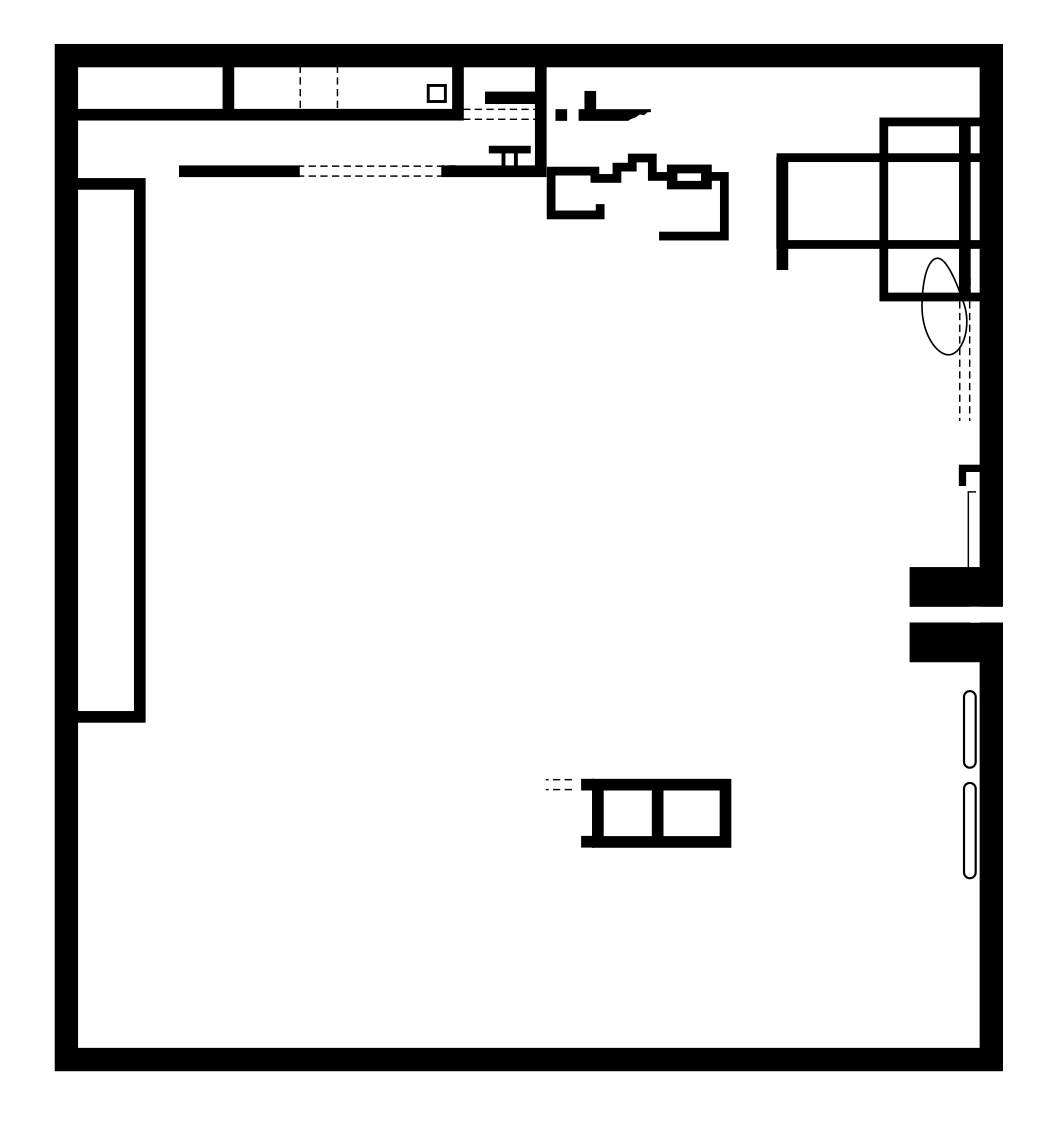
Plan of the Palace of Omurtag

The main feature of the archaeological site is the early-9th-century Bulgarian fortified rampart with Omurtag's palace within its limits. While much smaller than the fortifications of nearby Pliska, the fort at Han Krum resembles closely the defensive walls of the capital. The fortress, known to the locals as Hisar Kale (from Turkish, both words meaning "castle, fortress"), measures 405 m × 515 m (1,329 ft × 1,690 ft) and has an area of 0.2084 square kilometres (0.0805 sq mi). Several structures of the same age lay inside the fort; these included an inner fortification 92.5 m × 113.6 m (303 ft × 373 ft) in size and stone buildings of varying complexity, such as a three-roomed bath. The inner fort had its main entrance located in the eastern part. The buildings within the enclosure are thought to have served as a noble dwelling, i.e. a palace, though it is archaeologically uncertain whether they date to Omurtag's reign or to a later period. Balabanov theorizes that the fort accommodated a garrison commander and barracks.

Fragments of a lion sculpture that was originally 1 m (3.3 ft) in height have been discovered inside the fort, prompting researchers to identify it with one of the two lions mentioned in the Chatalar Inscription. There are indications that a pagan sanctuary, where animal sacrifice was practiced, was also located at the site. Buried carcasses of rabbits and dogs, medieval vessels, and a plastered stone with rims and furrows allowing blood to flow to a pit all testify to that use.

A fifth church at Han Krum, discovered by archaeologist Kremena Stoeva in 2009, is thought to date to the 10th century, the time after the Christianization of Bulgaria. It has three naves and three apses. It has been conclusively dated to that period based on the surrounding pottery, as well as its architecture.

== Sources ==
- Curta, Florin; Roman Kovalev (2008). The other Europe in the Middle Ages: Avars, Bulgars, Khazars, and Cumans. BRILL. pp. 193–196. ISBN 978-90-04-16389-8.
- Henning, Joachim (2007). Post-Roman Towns, Trade and Settlement in Europe and Byzantium. Vol. 2, Byzantium, Pliska, and the Balkans. Walter de Gruyter. pp. 433–436. ISBN 978-3-11-018358-0.
