= Omurtag's Tarnovo inscription =

Bulgarian Greek-language inscription

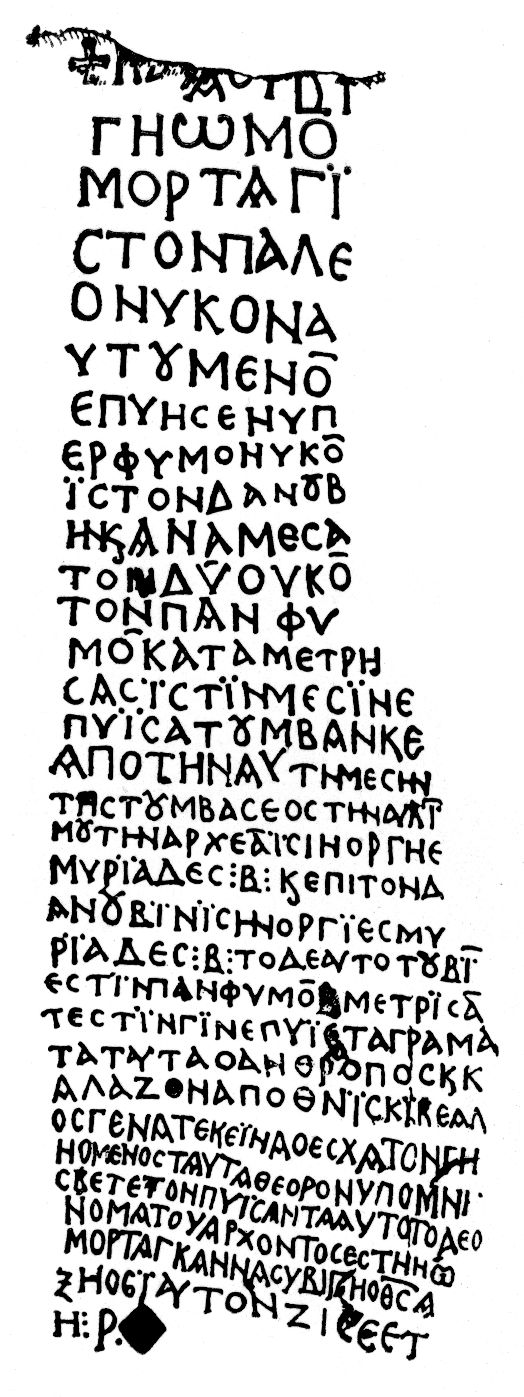
The Omurtag's Tarnovo Inscription.

The Omurtag's Tarnovo inscription is an inscription in the Greek language, engraved on a column of dark syenite, found in the SS. Forty Martyrs Church in Tarnovo, Bulgaria. The inscription was found in 1858 when Hristo Daskalov, from Tryavna, managed to visit the church (which was converted to a mosque at that time) and to make a replica of the inscription.

Along with the Chatalar Inscription, the Tarnovo inscription testifies for the active construction during the reign of Kanasubigi Omurtag (r. 814–831 CE). It is assumed that the inscription was made in 822. Historians are uncertain about the original location of the inscription (probably Pliska) and the location of the "new home on the Danube", for which the inscription was created. Contenders include Silistra, the village of Malak Preslavets, or the island of Păcuiul lui Soare (now in Romania).

== Content ==
=== Original ===
+ Κα[ν]α συβιγη Ωμο<μο>ρταγ ις τον παλεον υκον αυτου μενο(ν) επυησεν υπερφυμον υκο(ν) ις τον Δανουβην κ(ε) αναμεσα τον δυο υκο(ν) τον πανφυμο(ν) καταμετρησας ις τιν μεσην επυισα τουμβαν κε απο τιν αυτη(ν) μεσην της τουμβας εος την αυλι(ν) μου την αρχεα(ν) ισιν οργηε μυριαδες β' κ(ε) επι τον Δανουβιν ισην οργιες μυριαδες β'. το δε αυτο τουβι(ν) εστιν πανφυμο(ν) κ(ε) μετρισα(ν)τες τιν γιν επυισα τα γραματα ταυτα. ο ανθροπος κ(ε) καλα ζον αποθνισκι κε αλος γενατε κε ινα ο εσχατον γηνομενος ταυτα θεορον υπομνησκετε τον πυισαντα αυτο. το δε ονομα του αρχοντος εστην Ωμορταγ καν(ν)α συβιγη· ο Θ(εο)ς αξηοσι αυτον ζισε ετη ρ'.

=== Translation ===
"Kana subigi Omurtag, living in his old home, made a glorious home on the Danube and in the middle between the two most glorious homes, after he measured [the distance], he made a tumulus. From the very centre of the tumulus to my old palace there are 20,000 fathoms (ὀργυιά) and to the Danube there are 20,000 fathoms. The tumulus itself is most glorious and after they measured the land I made that inscription. Even if a man lives well, he dies and another one comes into existence. Let the one who comes later upon seeing this inscription remember the one who had made it. And the name is Omurtag, Kana subigi. Let God make him live 100 years."

== See also ==
- Kanasubigi
- Chatalar Inscription
