= Păcuiul lui Soare =

Coordinates: 44°7′53.6″N 27°28′13.8″E

Păcuiul lui Soare is an island on the Danube in southeastern Romania, known for its Bulgarian and Byzantine fortress, built in the 8th century and abandoned by the 15th century.

The island belongs to the Ostrov commune in Constanța County. The village of Ostrov is located on the southern bank of the Danube, in the historical region of Northern Dobruja. The island's name in Romanian means "Soare's Island", using an archaic word for "island". Soare itself (meaning "Sun" in Romanian) is a Romanian name.

Modern researchers suppose that the ruins from the beginning of the 8th century belong to the "Glorious Palace" of the Khans of the First Bulgarian Empire on the Danube and the main base of the Bulgarian Danube fleet. Many Protobulgarian marks have been found engraved in the masonry, resembling that of the imperial capital Pliska. The text from the Holy 40 Martyrs Column found in Tarnovo indicates that the Great Khan Omurtag (?–831) built, perhaps over Byzantine ruins, the medieval port and palace complex.

Archaeologist Petre Diaconu states that the fortress was built between 972 and 976 by the troops of Emperor John I Tzimiskes.

In the 1950s, about 25% of the fortress was visible, and in 2011, 10-15% of the fortress was still visible, due to erosion.

== Gallery ==
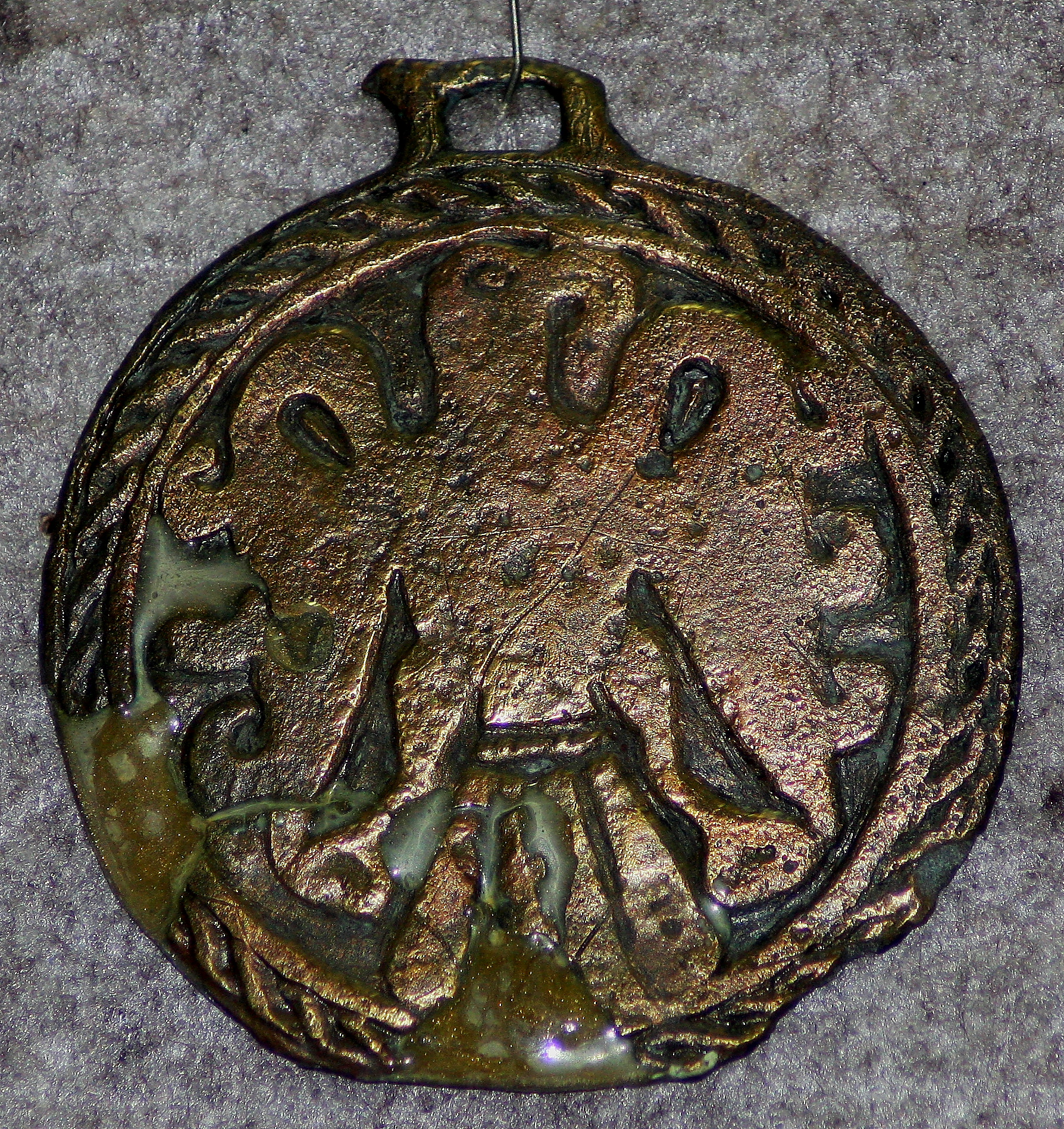
A medieval medallion discovered on Păcuiul lui Soare

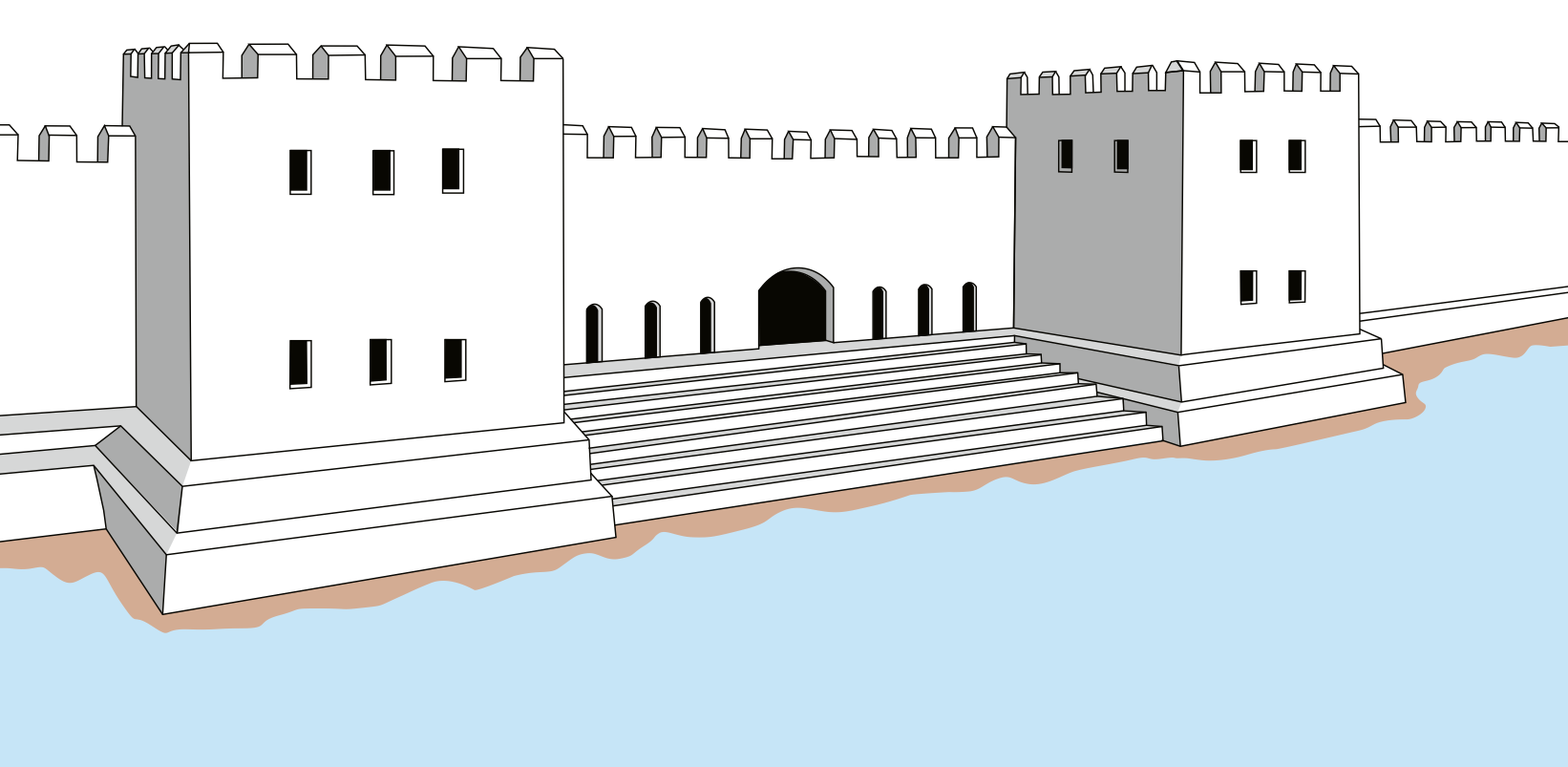
Wharf of the fortress-reconstruction

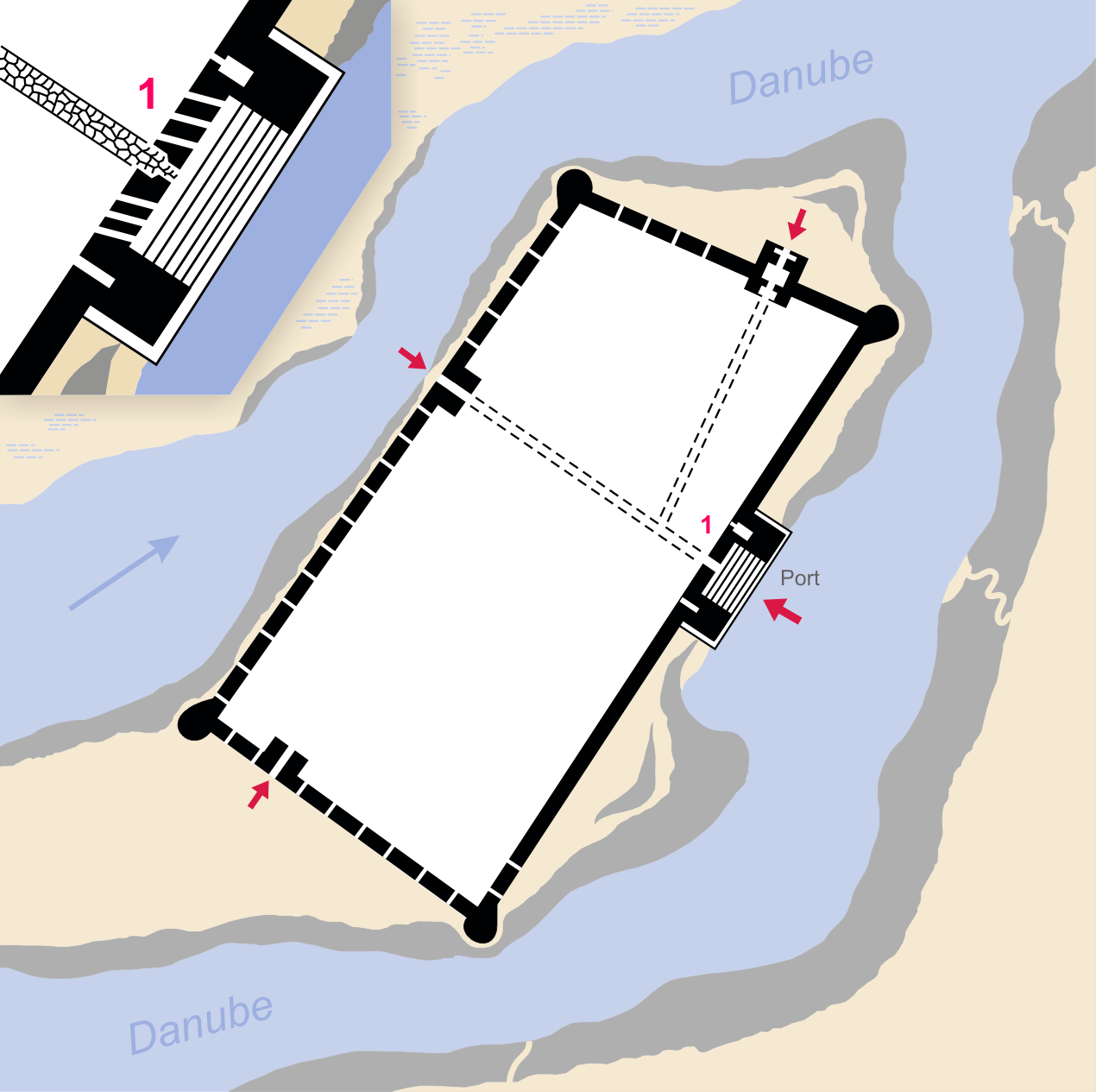
Plan of the Bulgarian fortress
