= Han Krum (village) =

Han Krum Хан Крум
- Village
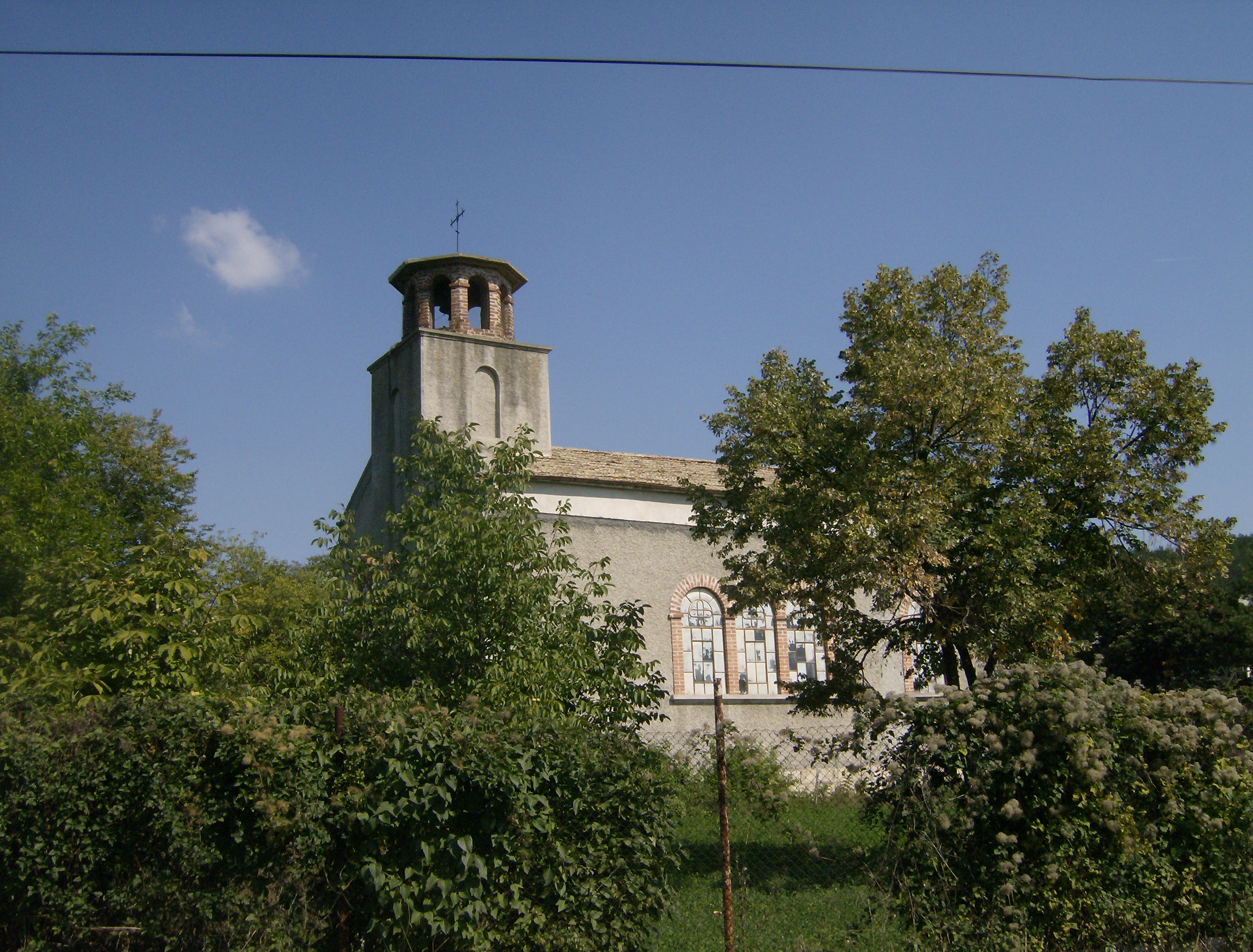

- Location of Han Krum
- Coordinates: 43°12′N 26°53′E
- Country: Bulgaria
- Provinces (Oblast): Shumen Province

Government
  - Mayor: Stoyan Batov (BDS Radicals)

Area
  - Total: 5.763 km^{2} (2.225 sq mi)
- Elevation: 98 m (322 ft)

Population (2007-01-01)
  - Total: 332
  - Density: 57.6/km^{2} (149/sq mi)
- Time zone: UTC+2 (EET)
  - Summer (DST): UTC+3 (EEST)
- Postal Code: 9863

Han Krum (Bulgarian: Хан Крум) is a village in the municipality of Preslav, Shumen Province, north-eastern Bulgaria. As of 2022 it has 332 inhabitants.

Up to 1899 the village was called Chatalar and was then renamed to Tsar Krum and in 1977 to Khan Krum, after Krum who ruled Bulgaria between 803 and 814. According to some historians the Gothic episcopal see of Ulfilas was located on the site of the village. There are remains of churches dated to 4th and 5th centuries.

The old Bulgarian Palace of Omurtag, also known as Aul of Omurtag, was discovered in the surroundings of the village. The palace is dated to the constructions of Khan Omurtag (814-831) based on the Chatalar Inscription.

A rock monastery is situated close to the village based on a natural cave which was later expanded.

== Sources ==
- Тодор Балабанов. Отново за готите и епископския център от IV-V в. до с. Хан Крум, Шуменско. - Във: Великотърновският университет "Св. Св. Кирил и Методий" и българската археология - 1. Велико Търново, УИ "Св. св. Кирил и Методий" - Велико Търново, 2010.
