= Bulgar language =

Extinct Oghur Turkic language

Bulgar
- Region: From Central Asia to the Pontic–Caspian steppe, the Volga and the Danube and Southern Italy (Molise, Campania)
- Ethnicity: Bulgars
- Extinct: By the 9th century on the Danube and by the 14th century in the Volga region
- Language family: Turkic: Oghuric; Bulgar
- Dialects: Danubian Bulgar; Volga Bulgar

Language codes
- ISO 639-3: xbo
- Glottolog: bolg1250

Bulgar (also known as Bulghar, Bolgar, or Bolghar) is the extinct Oghur Turkic language spoken by the Bulgars.

The name is derived from the Bulgars, a tribal association that established the Bulgar state known as Old Great Bulgaria in the mid-7th century, giving rise to the First Bulgarian Empire by the 680s. While the language initially went extinct in Danubian Bulgaria (in favour of Old Church Slavonic), it persisted in Volga Bulgaria, but even there it was eventually replaced by the modern Chuvash language. Other than Chuvash, Bulgar is the only language to be definitively classified as an Oghur Turkic language.

The inclusion of other languages such as Hunnish, Khazar and Sabir within Oghur Turkic remains speculative owing to the paucity of historical records. Some scholars suggest that Hunnish had strong ties with Bulgar and to modern Chuvash and refer to this extended grouping as separate Hunno-Bulgar languages. However, such speculations are not based on proper linguistic evidence, since the language of the Huns is almost unknown except for a few attested words, which are Indo-European in origin, and personal names. Thus, scholars generally consider Hunnish as unclassifiable.

== Affiliation ==
=== Medieval scholars observations ===
As was stated by Al-Istakhri (c. 10 century CE), "The language of the Khazars is different than the language of the Turks and the Persians, nor does a tongue of (any) group of humanity have anything in common with it and the language of the Bulgars is like the language of the Khazars, but the Burtas have another language."

Ibn Hawqal, who travelled during the years 943 to 969 AD, wrote that "the Bulgar language resembles that of the Khazars".

Al-Biruni (973 – 1050), while discussing the Volga Bulgars and Sawars (Sabirs), noted their language was a "mixture of Turkic and Khazar."

=== Mainstream linguistic classification ===
Mainstream scholarship places Bulgar among the "Lir" branch of Turkic languages referred to as Oghur Turkic, Lir-Turkic or, indeed, "Bulgar Turkic", as opposed to the "Shaz"-type of Common Turkic. The "Lir" branch is characterized by sound correspondences such as Oghuric /r/ versus Common Turkic (or Shaz-Turkic) /z/ and Oghuric /l/ versus Common Turkic (Shaz-Turkic) /ʃ/.

The only surviving language from this linguistic group is Chuvash.

=== Omeljan Pritsak hypothesis ===
Historian and linguist Omeljan Pritsak proposes that the language of the Bulgars was from the family of the extinct Hunnic languages, as he calls the Oghur languages. The slavic linguist Antoaneta Granberg from Göteborg University is the only scholar who follows the Pritsak's classifiacation, although her views differ significantly from the contemporary Bulgarian scholars. According her research on Bulgar remnants in Old Church Slavonic, situation is further complicated by the extensive migration of nomadic communities of Hunnic and Oghuric peoples from East to West. This migration brought them into contact with a variety of different lands, neighbours, cultures, and languages, including China and Rome. Thus, linguistic individuation of the Hunno-Bulgaric language family has yet to be conclusively established. A Hunno-Bulgar language is believed to have formed on the North-Western borders of China in the 3rd–5th centuries BC.

=== Iranian hypothesis ===
On the other hand, some modern Bulgarian scholars, who are not linguists, tried without much success to link the Bulgar language to the Iranic language group instead (more specifically, the Pamir languages are frequently mentioned), noting the presence of Iranian words in the modern Bulgarian language. According to Raymond Detrez, who is a specialist in Bulgarian history and language, such views are based on anti-Turkish sentiments that were prevalent during the 1980s, and the presence of Iranian words in the modern Bulgarian is a result of Ottoman Turkish linguistic influence. Indeed, other Bulgarian historians, especially older ones, only point out certain signs of Iranian influence in the Turkic base or indeed support the Turkic theory.

== Danubian Bulgar ==
The language of the Danube Bulgars (or Danubian Bulgar) is recorded in a small number of inscriptions, which are found in Pliska, the first capital of First Bulgarian Empire, and in the rock churches near the town of Murfatlar, in present-day Romania. Some of these inscriptions are written in the Greek characters, others in the Kuban alphabet which is a variant of Orkhon script. Most of these appear to have been of a private character (oaths, dedications, inscriptions on grave stones) and some were court inventories. Although attempts at decipherment have been made, none of them has gained wide acceptance. These inscriptions in Danubian Bulgar are found along with other, official ones written in Greek; which was used as the official state language of the First Bulgarian Empire until the end of the ninth century, when it was replaced by the Old Church Slavonic (also called Old Bulgarian).

The language of the Danubian Bulgars is also known from a small number of loanwords in the Old Bulgarian language, as well as terms occurring in Bulgar Greek-language inscriptions, contemporary Byzantine texts, and later Slavonic Old Bulgarian texts. Most of these words designate titles and other concepts concerning the affairs of state, including the official 12-year cyclic calendar (as used in the Nominalia of the Bulgarian khans). The language became extinct in Danubian Bulgaria in the ninth century as the Bulgar nobility became gradually Slavicized after the Old Bulgarian tongue was declared as official in 893.

Terms borrowed from Danube Bulgar by Old Church Slavonic
	Old Church Slavonic	Chuvash	Hungarian	Common Turkic
token, trace	БЕЛЕГ (beleg), БИЛЕГ (bileg)	палӑк (palăk)	bélyeg	*belgü
bracelet	БЕЛЬЧҮГ (belĭčug)	–	–	*bileçüg
pillow	ДОХЬТОРЬ (doxĭtorĭ)	ҫытар (śïtar)	–	*yogtu
image, icon	КАПЬ (kapĭ)	кап (kap)	kép	*kēp
honour	САНЬ (sanĭ), САМЬ (samĭ)	сум (sum)	szám	*sān

=== Phonology ===
Unlike Volga Bulgarian and Chuvash, d'ization is seen in the /j/ sounds at the beginning of words. Talât Tekin argues that this sound corresponds to the initial gy sound in Hungarian and is pronounced close to it.

Comparison of initial /j/
	Danube Bulgar / Old Church Slavonic	Volga Bulgar	Chuvash	Common Turkic
snake	ДИЛОМЬ (dilomĭ)	–	ҫӗлен (śílen)	*yï̄lan
pillow	ДОХЬТОРЬ (doxĭtorĭ)	–	ҫытар (śytar)	*yogdu (Mongolian зогдор)
horse	ΔΥΑΝ (dwan)	–	–	*yunt
An ethnicity	ΔΟΥΑΡΗⲤ (dovaris)	يوارى (yuwāri)	–	–
seven	ЧИТ (čit)	جىَاتِ (čyeti)	ҫиччӗ (śiččĕ)	*yẹti

== Volga Bulgar ==
The language spoken by the population of Volga Bulgaria is known as Volga-Bulgar. There are a number of surviving inscriptions in Volga-Bulgar, some of which are written with Arabic letters, alongside the continuing use of Orkhon script. These are all largely decipherable. That language persisted until the 13th or the 14th century. In that region, it may have ultimately given rise to the Chuvash language, which is most closely related to it and which is classified as the only surviving member of a separate "Oghur-Turkic" (or Lir-Turkic) branch of the Turkic languages, to which Bulgar is also considered to have belonged (see above). Still, the precise position of Chuvash within the Oghur family of languages is a matter of dispute among linguists. Since the comparative material attributable to the extinct members of Oghuric (Khazar and Bulgar) is scant, little is known about any precise interrelation of these languages and it is a matter of dispute whether Chuvash, the only "Lir"-type language with sufficient extant linguistic material, might be the daughter language of any of these or just a sister branch.

Numbers and Vocabulary in Volga Bulgar
	Volga Bulgar – البلغَاڔِى	Chuvash – Чӑвашла	Proto-Turkic		Volga Bulgar – البلغَاڔِى	Chuvash – Чӑвашла	Proto-Turkic
one	بیر (bīr)	пӗр (pĕr)	*bīr	monument	بَلُو (belüv)	палӑк (palăk)	*belig
two	اَكِ (eki)	иккӗ (ikkĕ)	*ẹki	water	شِو (šïv)	шыв (šyv)	*sub
three	وج (v^{e}č)	виççӗ (viśśĕ)	*üč	son	اَول (av^{ï}l)	ывӑл (yvăl)	*ogul
four	تُوات (tüvet)	тăваттă (tăvattă)	*tȫrt	daughter	هِير (hīr)	хӗр (hĕr)	*kï̄ŕ
five	بيال (b^{i}yel)	пиллӗк (pillĕk)	*bẹ̄ĺ(k)	day	كُوَان (küven or kön)	кун (kun)	*kün
six	اَلطِ (altï)	улттӑ (ulttă)	*altï	week	ايرنى (ērne)	эрне (erne)	(from Persian آدینه (âdine))
seven	جیَاتِ (čyeti)	ҫиччӗ (śiččĕ)	*yẹti	month	اَيخ (ay^{ï}x)	уйӑх (ujăh)	*āń(k)
eight	سَكِر (sekir)	саккӑр (sakkăr)	*sekiŕ	year	جال (čal)	ҫул (śul)	*yāĺ
nine	طُخِر (tuxïr)	тӑххӑр (tăhhăr)	*tokuŕ	history	تَارِيخ (tārix)	истори (istori)	(from Arabic تَارِيخ (tārīḵ))
ten	وان (van)	вуннӑ (vunnă)	*ōn	to become	بَل (bal)	пул (pul)	*bōl-
twenty	جِيِرم (čiyir^{i}m)	ҫирӗм (śirĕm)	*yẹgirmi	to do, make	طَن (ta-n)	ту (tu)	-
thirty	وطر (v^{u}t^{u}r)	вӑтӑр (vătăr)	*otuŕ	to go	بَر (bar)	пыр (pyr)	*bar-
forty	حرح (x^{ï}r^{ï}x)	хӗрӗх (hĕrĕh)	*kïrk	to love	سَو (sev)	сав (sav)	*seb-
fifty	الو (el^{lü}v), اَلُّ (ellü)	аллӑ (allă)	*ellig	to die	وَل (vel)	вил (vil)	*öl-
hundred	جُور (čǖr)	ҫӗр (śĕr)	*yǖŕ	to migrate	كُوَج (küveč or köč)	куҫ (kuś)	*köč-

Cases in Volga Bulgar
Case	Volga Bulgar	Examples in words
Genitive	-∅ or -(ı)n	اَغَان (ağā-n), يغقوُتن (yaquut-ın)
Accusative	-ne/na	مَسجِدسَمنَ (mesčidsem-ne)
Dative-locative	-a/e and -ne/na	اِشنَ (iš-ne), بَجنَ (bač-na), جَالَ (čāl-a)
Ablative	-ran, -ren; -tan, -ten	دنيَارَان (d^{ö}nyā-ran)
Third person possessive	-i, -ı; -si, -sı	هِيرِ (hīr-i), اِلغِجِسِ (ılğıčı-sı)

Definition of verbs in Volga Bulgar
Tenses and moods	Volga Bulgar	Examples in words
Past tense	-ti/tı, -ri/rı	وَلتِ (vel-ti)
Past tense 2	-ruvı/rüvi (<*-dugı), -tuvı/tüvi (<*-tugı)	كُوَجروُي (küveč-rüvi), بلطُوى (bal-tuvı)
Adjective form of verb	-an/en	طَنَان (tan-an), سَوَان (sev-en)
Adverb form of verb	-sa/se	بَرسَ (bar-sa)
Third person imperative	-tur/tür	طَنْطُرْ (tan-tur)

== See also ==
- Buyla inscription
