= Kanasubigi =

Title of early Bulgar rulers

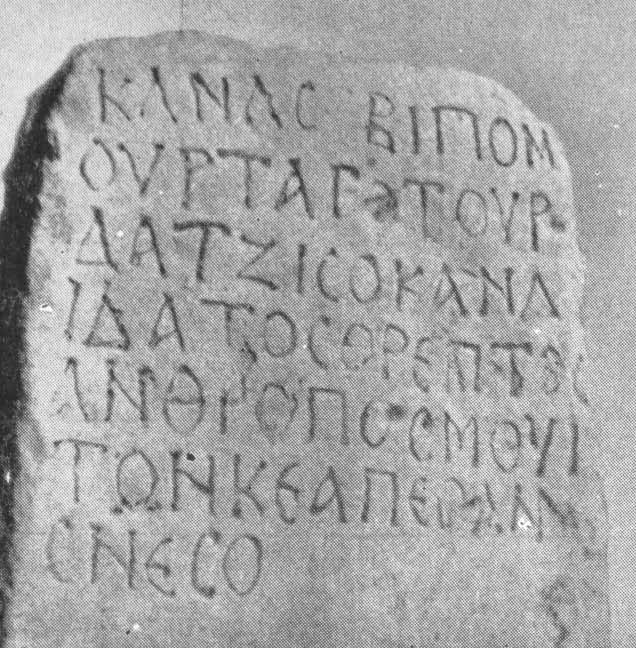
Inscriptions of Kan Omurtag of Bulgaria

Kanasubigi or Khanasubigi (Greek: ΚΑΝΑΣΥΒΙΓΙ), possibly read as Kanas Ubigi or Kana Subigi, was a Turkic title of the early Bulgar rulers of the First Bulgarian Empire. Omurtag (814–831) and his son Malamir (831–836) are mentioned in inscriptions as Kanasubigi.

Historians presume that it includes the title khan in its archaic form kana, suggesting that the latter title was indeed used in Bulgaria. Starting from the compound, non-ruler titles that were attested among Bulgar noble class such as "kavkhan", "tarkhan", and "boritarkhan", scholars derive the title khan for the early Bulgarian rulers. Examples of the use of the title khan by the Bulgars are provided also during the diplomatic mission to Charlemagne in 811. It was led by the then Bulgarian prince – Omurtag, the younger brother of Krum, in his capacity as „khan’s beloved younger brother” (khani sev`ingi or khani sev(inč) ingi). He introduced himself also as a "cani zautzi", that means „khan’s envoy”. Also, the name of one of the Bulgars' ruler Pagan occurs in Patriarch Nicephorus's so-called breviarium as Καμπαγάνος (Kampaganos), likely an erroneous rendition of the phrase "Khan Pagan". Among the proposed translations for the phrase kanasubigi as a whole are lord of the army, from the reconstructed Turkic phrase *sü begi, paralleling the attested Old Turkic sü baši, and, more recently, "(ruler) from God", from the Indo-European: *su-baga (an equivalent of the Greek phrase ὁ ἐκ Θεοῦ ἄρχων, ho ek Theou archon, which is common in Bulgar inscriptions). Another presumption is that the title means the great khan. The title "khagan" was also attributed to pagan Bulgar rulers in the Middle ages. These Turkic titulatures persisted until the Bulgars adopted Christianity.
