= Omurtag of Bulgaria =

Omurtag
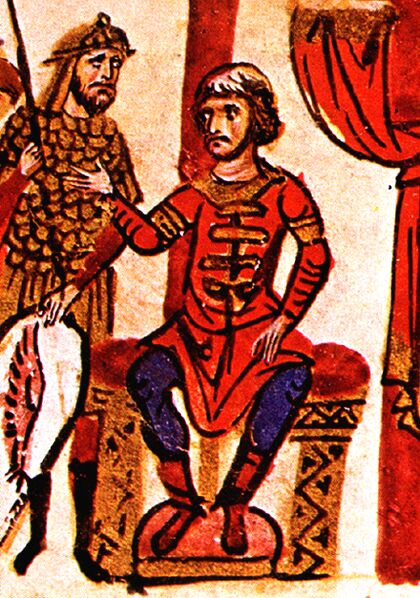

Ruler of Bulgaria
- Reign: 814–831
- Predecessor: Krum
- Successor: Malamir
- Died: 831
- Issue: Enravota; Zvinitsa; Malamir
- House: Krum's dynasty
- Father: Krum

Omurtag, or Omortag (died 831), also known as Murtag or Murtagon (Bulgarian: Омуртаг; Greek: Μορτάγων and Ομουρτάγ), was Khan (Kanasubigi) of Bulgaria from 814 to 831. He is known as "the Builder".

In the very beginning of his reign he signed a 30-year peace treaty with the neighboring Byzantine Empire which remained in force to the end of his life. Omurtag successfully coped with the aggressive policy of the Frankish Empire to take Bulgaria's north-western lands and suppressed the unrest among several Slavic tribes. He made administrative reforms which increased the power and the authority of the central government. His reign was marked with a strong development of Bulgarian architecture with a number of significant construction projects.

== Rise to the throne ==
After the death of Khan Krum there was a short period of political instability in the country. Some sources mention that Bulgaria was ruled by three nobles - Dukum (Δούκουμος; may be identical with Omurtag), Ditzeng ( Δίτζενγος; from Bulgar Di-jevğu/jabğu? according to Peter B. Golden), it could also rather be a title of Tsokos, according to H. Grégoire, compare ičirgü-boulias; and Tsog (Τζóκος?; compare Bulgar Coğ, ǰoɣ 'funeral feast'). It's been theorized that any of these names may also be synonyms with one another - who were recorded as persecutors of the Christians in the Byzantine sources. Several theories exist about the events in that period. According to them, those three nobles were either Krum's generals with a major role in the government but without assuming the throne; or regents to the infant Omurtag. The historians usually accept as a compromise the view of Professor Vasil Gyuzelev that Omurtag succeeded his father after short disturbances in the government.

== Foreign policy ==
=== First years of Omurtag ===
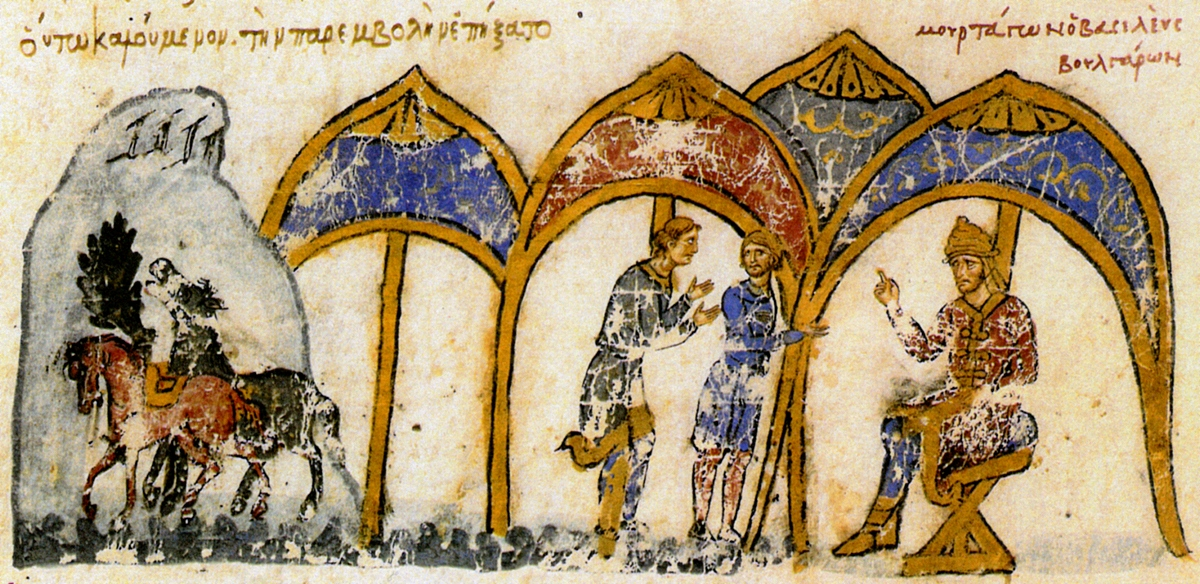
The Bulgarian ruler Omurtag sends delegation to the Byzantine emperor.

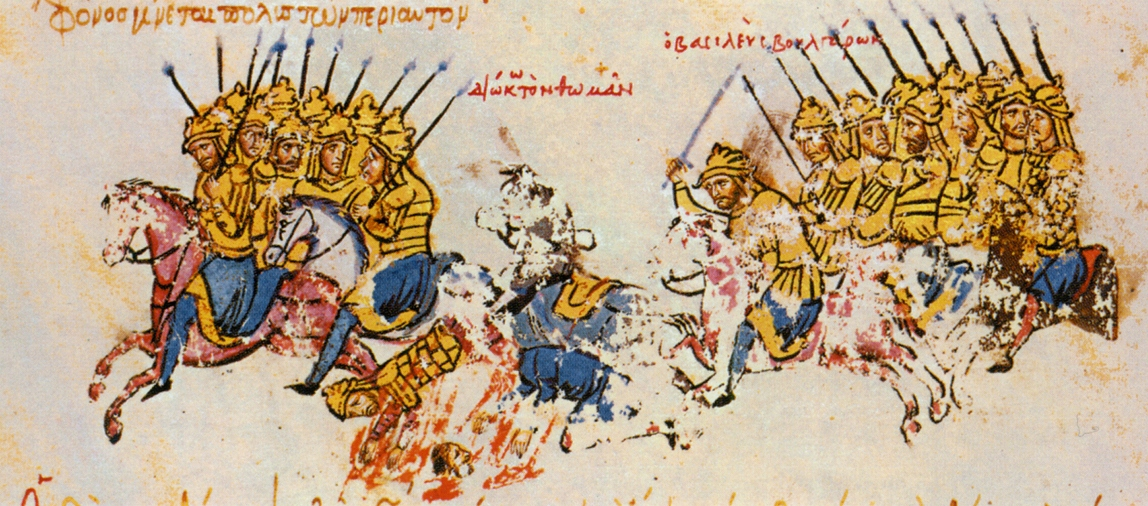
Omurtag pursues Thomas the Slav.

After the abrupt death of Khan Krum there were many Bulgarian troops in Thrace defending different strategic locations. The Byzantine Emperor Leo V the Armenian made use of the short crisis in the summer of 814 and led his troops against the Bulgarians. In the ensuing battle near the town of Burtodizos (probably the modern Babaeski) the Byzantines were victorious - Omurtag escaped the battlefield on his swift horse. However, the battle was not a decisive blow for the Bulgarians although it certainly had some effect .

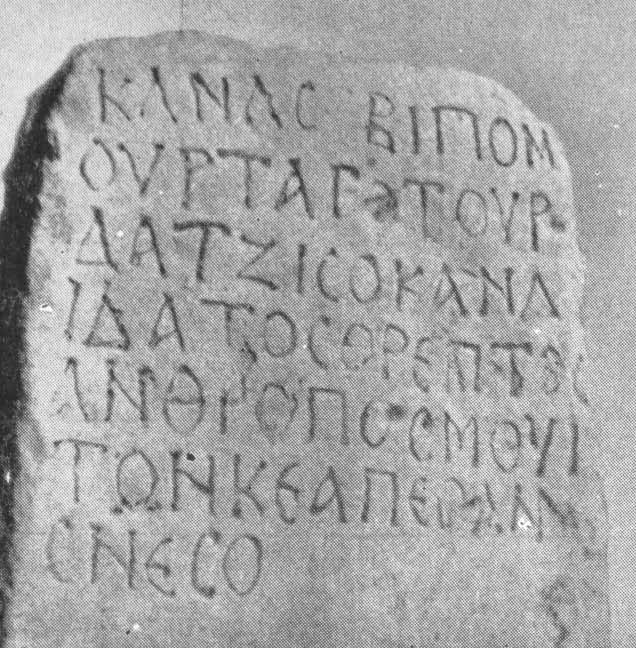
Greek Inscription bearing the words "kanas bigiom ourtag" (Kanas(u)bigi Omurtag) in the first two lines. Pliska, Bulgaria.

Besides that assault the Byzantines took other precautions against the Bulgarians. In the beginning of 814 they sent emissaries to the Frankish ruler Louis the Pious to make an alliance against Bulgaria. It is unknown whether they reached an agreement but most probably the Frankish Emperor did not agree to any tangible actions. However, when the news for a possible alliance between the two empires reached Pliska, the Bulgarians decided to conclude a peace. Moreover, they needed to consolidate their authority in the newly conquered lands. The appearance of the Frankish state and the new stirring of the tribes in the steppes necessitated that the rear should be secured before further campaigning against the Byzantine Empire. Those considerations gave reason for Omurtag to conclude a 30-year peace treaty with the Byzantines in 815, which was partly inscribed on a surviving column found near the village of Seltsi, Shumen Province. According to that inscription the treaty specified:

- the border in Thrace. It began on the Black Sea coast near Debelt, passed along the earth ditch Erkesiya, continued to the Makri Livada (in modern Haskovo Province) on the Maritsa river and from there to the Rhodope Mountains but without including Plovdiv within Bulgaria's borders.
- the issue with the Slavs which remained in Byzantium. The Bulgarians proposed to exchange the Byzantine captives for the Slavic population of Thrace.
- the exchange of the other prisoners of war.

The two rulers had sworn to uphold the conditions of the treaty by each other's rites, which scandalized the Byzantine court. The treaty was very favourable for Bulgaria because the country needed peace. The army was exhausted, the capital Pliska was still in ruins after the invasion of Nicephorus I in 811 and the Byzantine Empire was no longer a serious threat for the Bulgarians. The treaty was honoured by both sides and was renewed after the accession of the new Byzantine Emperor Michael II to the throne in 820. In 821 Thomas the Slav rebelled against the Byzantine Emperor and laid siege to Constantinople to seize the Imperial throne for himself. Khan Omurtag sent an army to help Michael II put down the rebellion which attacked the rebels at the Battle of Kedouktos (winter 822 or spring 823).

=== Relations with the Frankish Empire ===
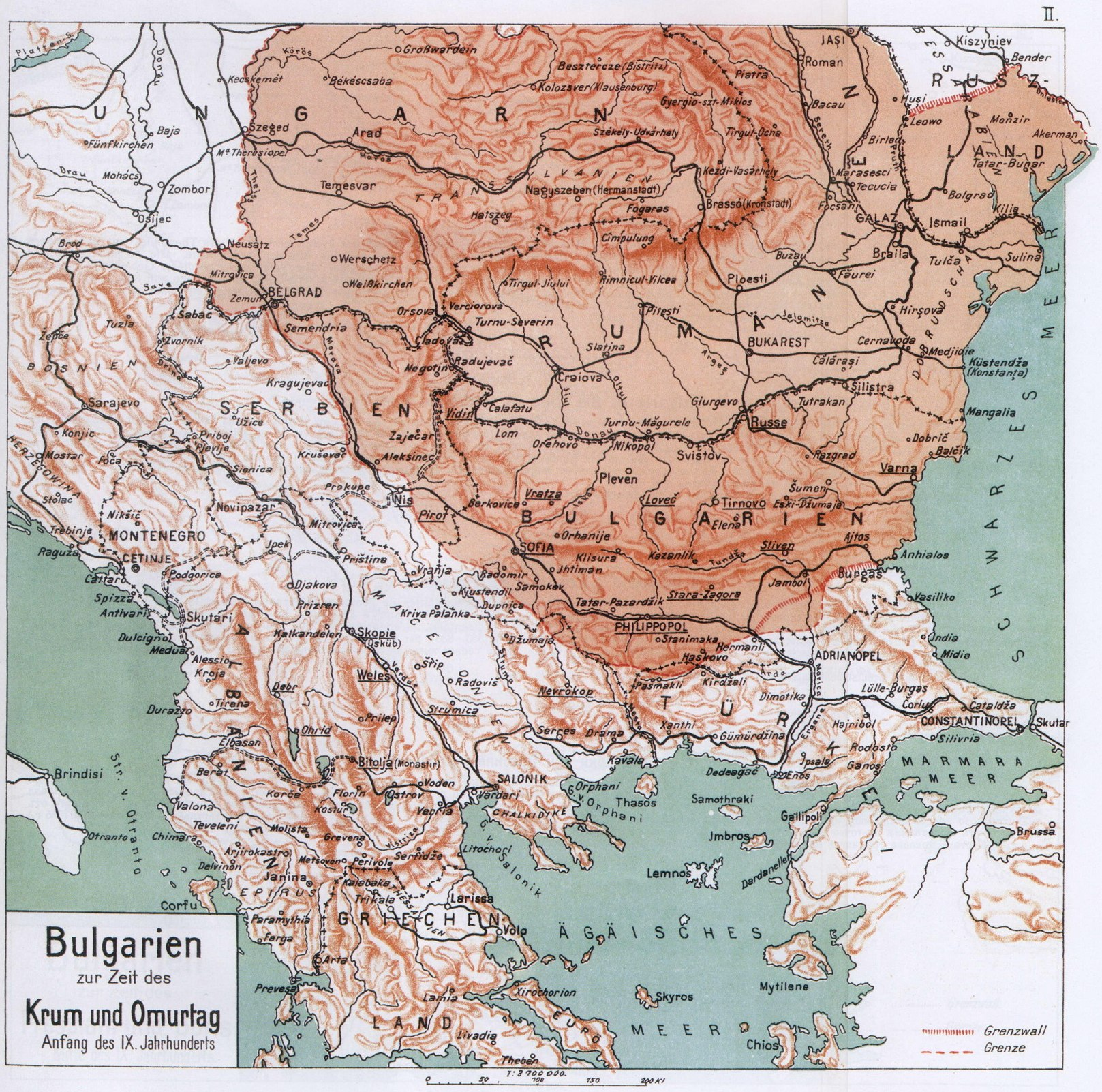
Bulgarian Empire during the reign of Omurtag

In 818 the Slavic tribes of the Timočani, Abodrites, and Braničevci (who inhabited the lands along the middle Danube, former Avar domains) rebelled against the increasingly centralized Bulgarian suzerainty in the west and sought the support of the Frankish Emperor Louis the Pious. Between 824 and 826 Omurtag approached the Frankish court with an attempt to seek a diplomatic resolution of the problem. Failing to gain Frankish co-operation, Omurtag issued an ultimatum in 826 and in 827 sent a fleet along the Danube and the Drava, which restored Bulgarian control over portions of southeastern Pannonia. The Franks were defeated in several minor fights. The Bulgarian victory was to a large extent because the Franks did not have claims for Bulgarian territories. After that short-term conflict the relations between the two countries improved and Omurtag replaced the local Slavic chiefs with his deputies. Similar events took place again in 829 with the same result. Those events were described in a memorial inscription for the zera-tarkhan Onegavon who drowned in the Tisza river. Furthermore, there was a large buffer zone between the Danube and the Tisza called Kazárország (inhabited by certain "Cozar" people) which separated the two states. The problems in that case were the attempts of several Slavic tribes to gain more autonomy which was at variance to the Bulgarian policy of centralization and incorporation of the Slavs.

Another memorial inscription, for kopan Okorsis who drowned in the Dneper, testifies to military activities along the north-eastern border dating as early as 824. However, it is not certain whom the Bulgarians fought. It is usually agreed that it was the Magyars, but recently the opinion of Professor Ivan Bozhilov that the war was against the Khazars has become increasingly popular. Although there is no direct evidence for the outcome of the war, it can be assumed that it ended with a Bulgarian victory due to the swift and energetic precautions taken by Omurtag.

== Internal policy ==
The long peace was a favourable time for an active internal policy for the further consolidation of the forming Bulgarian Nation, removal of many internal threats to improve stability, and intensive building.

=== Administration ===
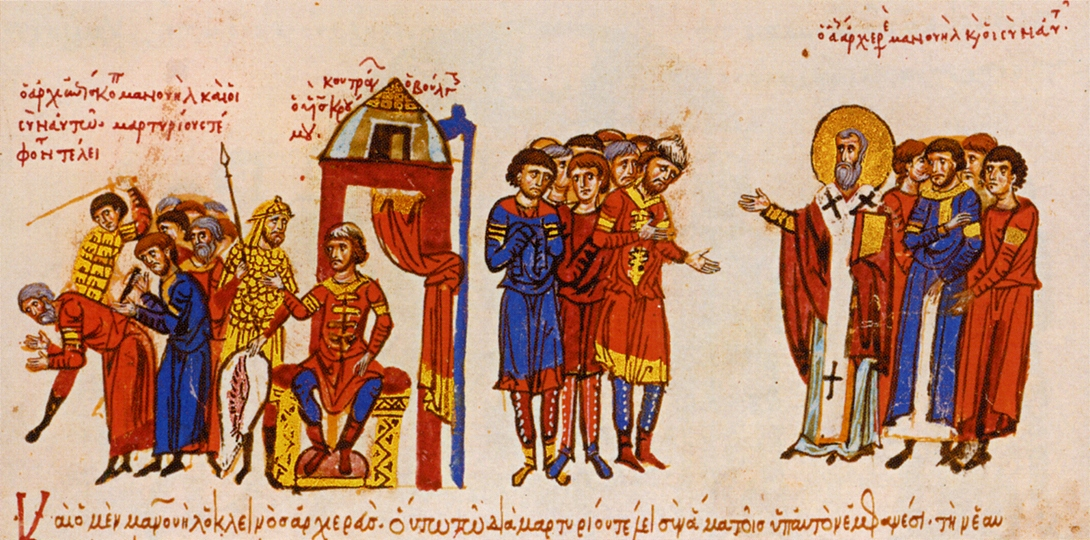
Omurtag orders the murder of Christians

After the unsuccessful attempts of several Slavic chiefs to secede from Bulgaria, Omurtag conclusively eliminated the autonomy of the Slavic tribes in the vast country. He made an administrative reform and divided the state into large provinces called comitati (singular comitat) whose governors were directly appointed by the Kanasubigi and had both military and civil authority. The comitati were further divided into smaller regions called zhupi (singular zhupa). The area around the capital had a special status. The Army was integrated and became unified; it no longer relied on separate Slav infantry and Bulgar cavalry. The importance of Kanasubigi's first ministers, the kavkhan and the ichirgu-boil grew. As a result, from the reforms Bulgaria was consolidated and further centralized.

=== Building activity ===
...Even if a man lives well, he dies and another one comes into existence. Let the one who comes later upon seeing this inscription remember the one who had made it. And the name is Omurtag, Kanasubigi.

— from Omurtag's Tarnovo Inscription

At home Omurtag undertook large-scale construction, intended to both restore his capital Pliska, which had been destroyed by the Byzantines in 811, and to foster the development of a number of regional centers, palaces, and fortifications. His construction activities contributed greatly to the development of the Pliska-Preslav culture. Many sources (e.g., the Chatalar and Tarnovo inscriptions) and memorial inscriptions are preserved, which testify to the reconstruction of Pliska, the building of a new palace with a large throne room, and a temple of Tangra. There was an alley of stone columns with the names of the conquered towns in Thrace. A number of palaces and fortresses were built along the Danube, as well as the Khan's residences in Tarnovo and Chatalar (present-day Han Krum near Shumen. The construction of those projects required a strong economy, which Bulgaria obviously possessed.

=== Persecution of the Christians ===
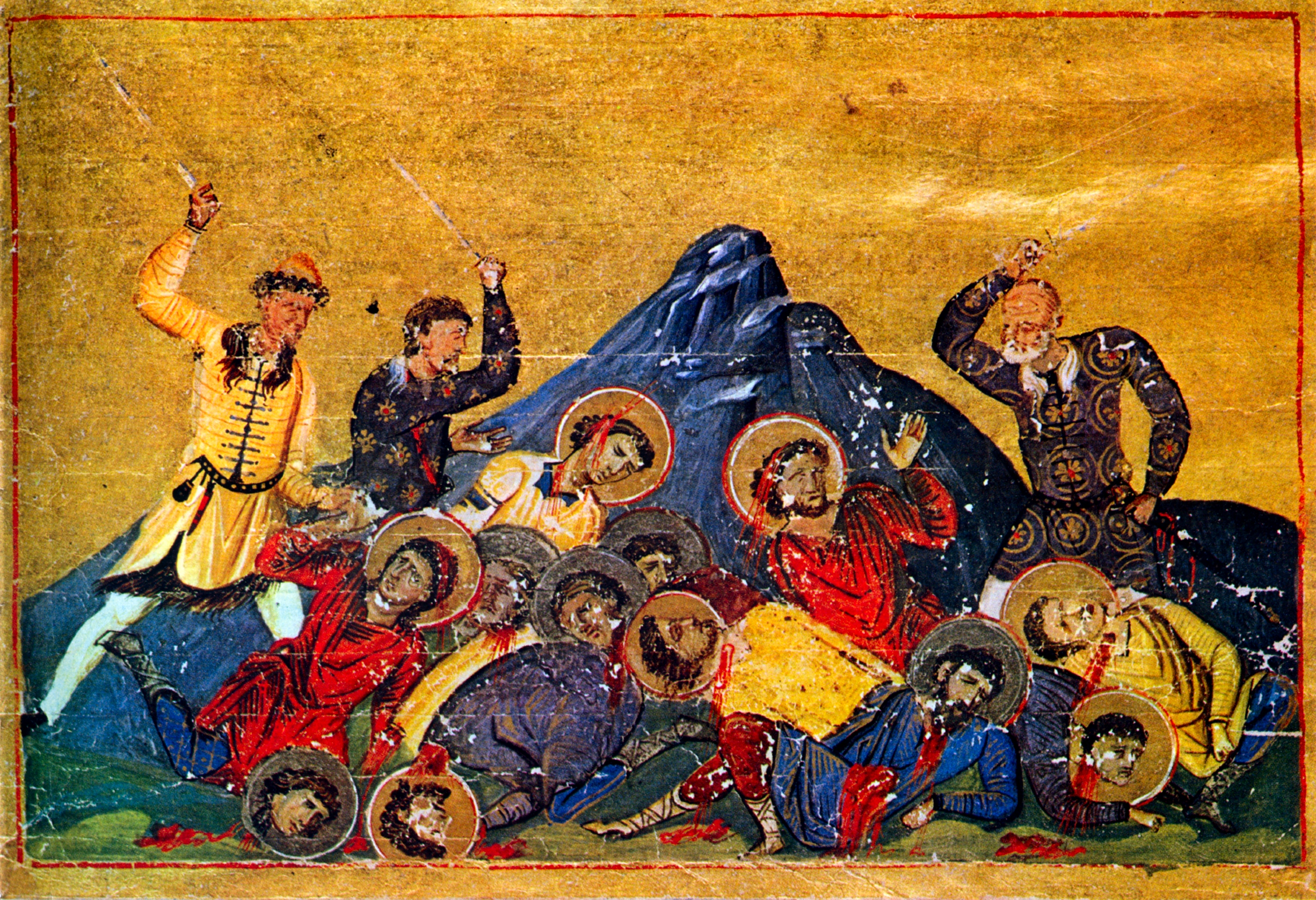
Bulgarian soldiers slaughter Christians, from the Menologion of Basil II, 10th century.

Omurtag pursued a policy of repression against Christians, particularly the Byzantine prisoners of war settled by his father Krum in Bulgaria (mostly north of the Danube). The Menologion of Basil II glorifies Emperor Basil II, showing him as a warrior defending Orthodox Christendom against the Bulgarian Empire, whose attacks on Christians are graphically illustrated. Even figures like the archangels were depicted in military guise by the painters. The persecution may have been motivated in part by the Byzantine invasion of 811 or with the beginning of Christian proselytizing by members of the substantial captive population. In connection with these policies, Omurtag disinherited his eldest son Enravota (Voin or Boyan), who had shown himself sympathetic to Christianity. Inferences about Omurtag's policy towards the Slavs based on his naming Slavic tribes among his enemies in one inscription or on the alleged Slavic names of his three sons are overly speculative.

The 17th-century Volga Bulgar compilation Ja'far Tarikh (a work of disputed authenticity) represents Amurtag or Yomyrčak (i.e., Omurtag) as the son of Korym (i.e., Krum).

== Honour ==
Omurtag Pass on Livingston Island in the South Shetland Islands, Antarctica is named after Omurtag of Bulgaria.

== See also ==
- Palace of Omurtag
- History of Bulgaria
- Bulgars

== Footnotes ==
Preceded by Krum	Khan of Bulgaria; 814–831	Succeeded by Malamir
