= Konda =

Konda may refer to:

- Kondia or Konda, 18th century Mansi principality, Russia
- Konda (river) in the Khanty-Mansi Autonomous Okrug, Russia
- Konda (Vitim), river in Buryatia, Russia
- Konda, South Konawe, a kecamatan in Southeast Sulawesi, Indonesia.
- Konda, Angola, municipality in Cuanza Sul Province, Angola
- Konda, either of two towns in Ogooué-Lolo Province, Gabon
- Konda, village in Njikwa, Cameroon
- the Konda language (Papuan) of Indonesia
- the Konda language (Dravidian) of India, a member of the Dravidian languages
- Konda, one of the Scheduled Tribes in India
- KONDA Research and Consultancy is a Turkish public opinion research and consultancy company established in 1986.
- Konda Bimbaša (fl. 1804–06), Ottoman Greek mercenary turned Serbian rebel
- A song by Miles Davis on his Directions album
- Konda (film), 2022 Indian Telugu-language political crime thriller film
- The Konda dialect of Eastern Mansi language

== See also ==
- Conda (disambiguation)
