= Mostich Hill =

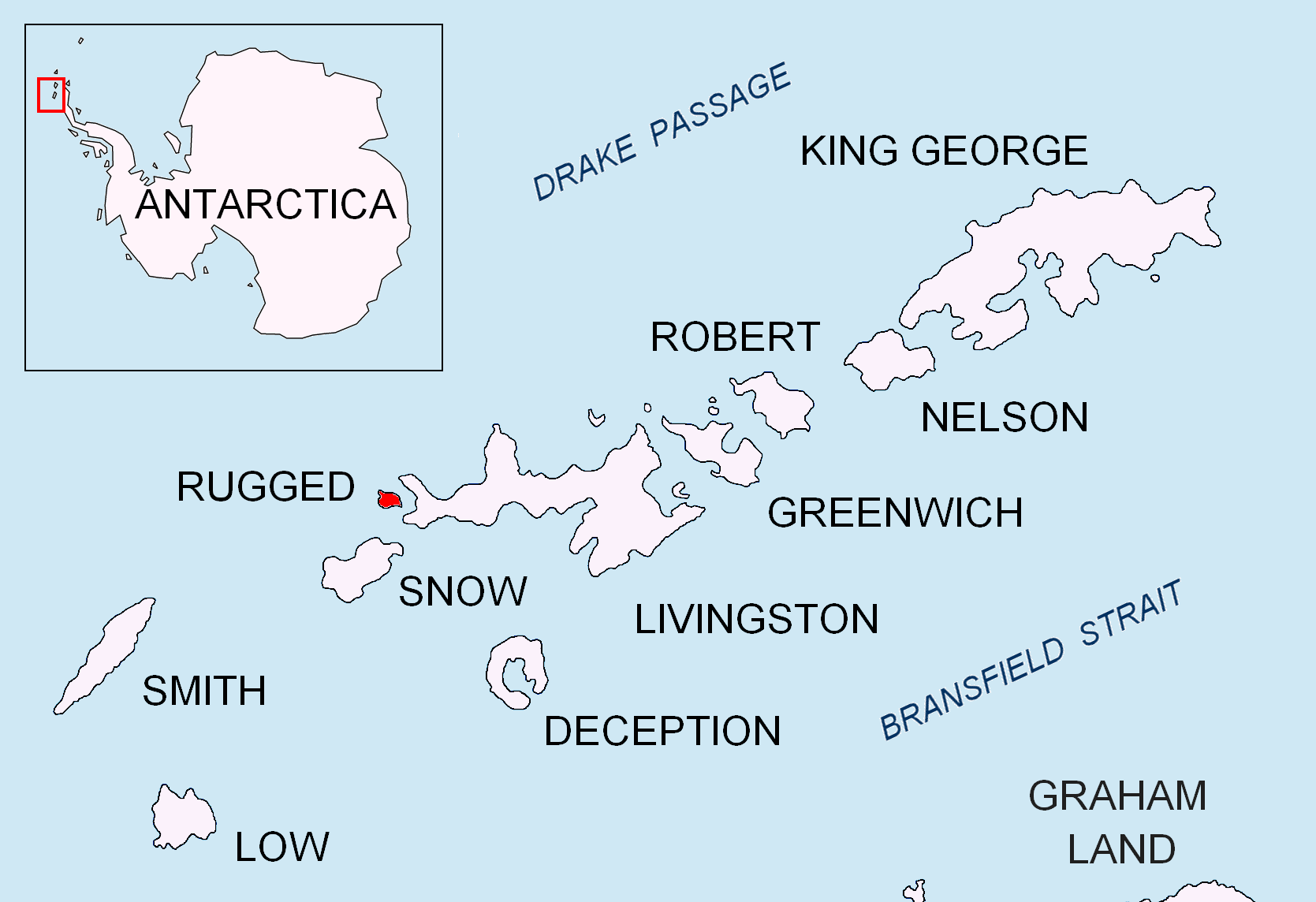
Location of Rugged Island in the South Shetland Islands

Topographic map of Livingston Island and Smith Island

Mostich Hill (Bulgarian: хълм Мостич, ‘Halm Mostich’ \'h&lm 'mos-tich\) is a rocky hill rising to 130 m in the southwestern part of Rugged Island off the west coast of Byers Peninsula of Livingston Island in the South Shetland Islands, Antarctica. Situated 780 m northeast of Benson Point, 3.16 km south-southeast of Cape Sheffield, and 3.78 km west of Radev Point.

The hill is named after Mostich, Ichirgu-boil (chief boyar) of Czar Simeon the Great and Peter I of Bulgaria (10th Century AD).

== Location ==
Mostich Hill is located at 62°38′24.7″S 61°16′31.4″W. Spanish mapping in 1992 and Bulgarian in 2009.

== Maps ==
- Península Byers, Isla Livingston. Mapa topográfico a escala 1:25000. Madrid: Servicio Geográfico del Ejército, 1992.
- L.L. Ivanov. Antarctica: Livingston Island and Greenwich, Robert, Snow and Smith Islands. Scale 1:120000 topographic map. Troyan: Manfred Wörner Foundation, 2009. ISBN 978-954-92032-6-4
