= Moramo Waterfalls =

Moramo Waterfalls is a cascade waterfall located in Kendari, South Konawe Regency, Southeast Sulawesi, Indonesia. GPS coordinate 3° 58' 2.96" S 122° 35' 40.92" E.

== See also ==
- List of waterfalls
