= Tsar =

Monarchical title in some Slavic countries

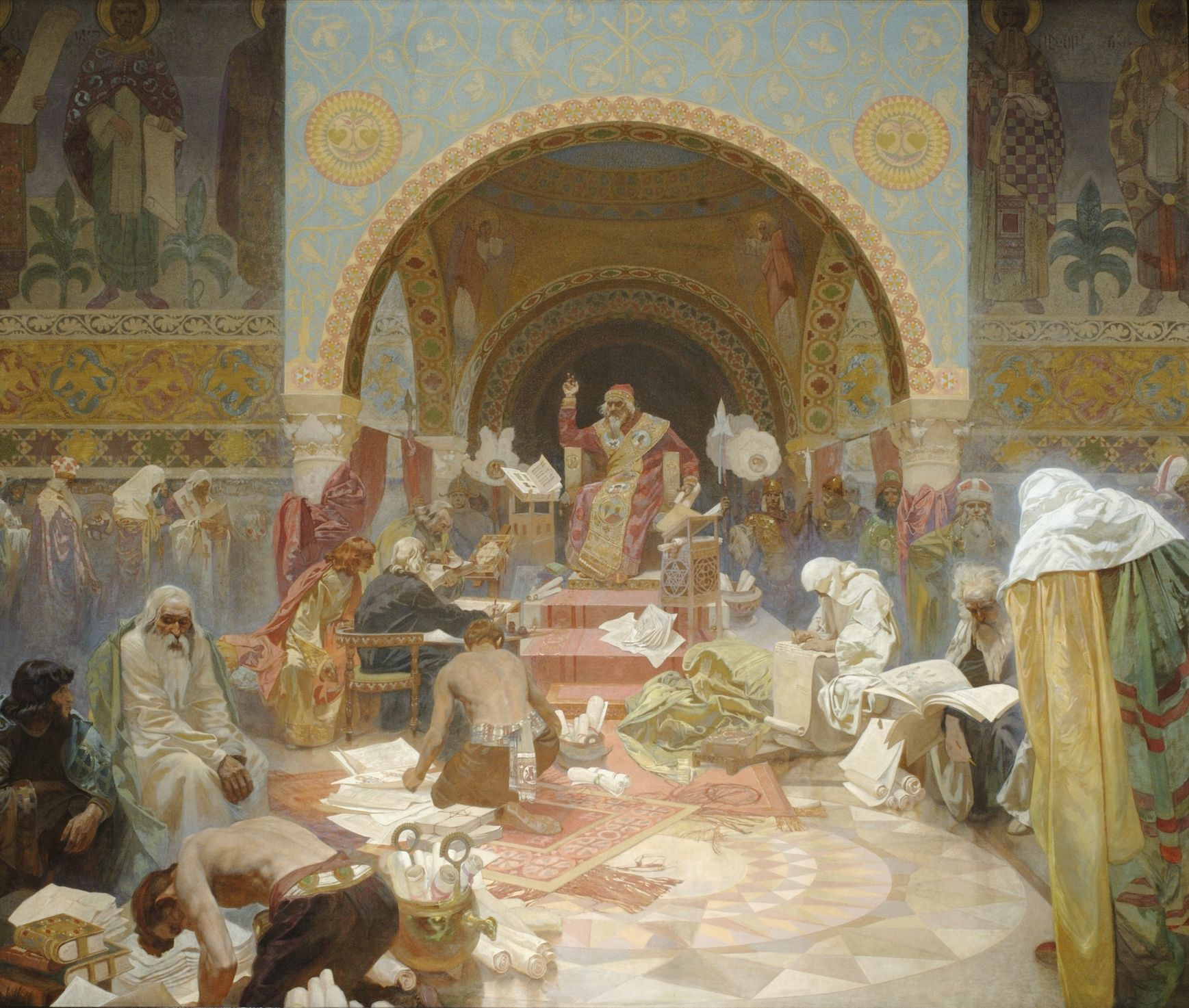
Simeon I of Bulgaria, the first Bulgarian tsar and the first to bear the title. Painting by Alphonse Mucha, 1923.

Crowning of Stefan Dušan as Serbian tsar. Painting by Paja Jovanović, 1900.

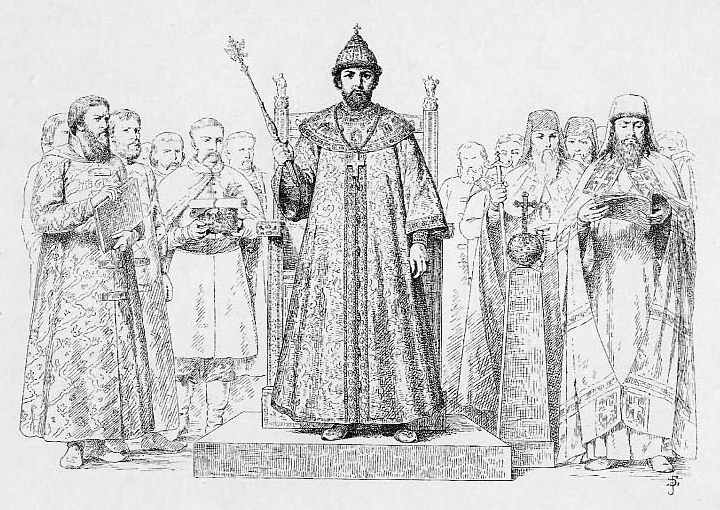
Russian tsar Alexei Mikhailovich. Drawing by Vasily Vereshchagin, 1896.

Tsar, also spelled czar, tzar, or csar (Note: Bulgarian: цар, romanized: car, IPA: [t͡sar]; Belarusian: цар, romanized: car, IPA: [t͡sar]; Macedonian: цар, romanized: car, IPA: [t͡sar]; Russian: царь, romanized: carj, IPA: [t͡sarʲ]; Serbian: цар, car, [t͡sâr]) (/zɑːr, (t)sɑːr/), is a Slavic title derived from the Latin word caesar. It was intended to mean "emperor" in the European medieval sense of the term—a ruler with the same rank as a Roman emperor, holding it by the approval of another emperor or a supreme ecclesiastical official—but was usually considered by Western Europeans to be equivalent to "king".

Tsar and its variants were the official titles in the First Bulgarian Empire (681–1018), the Second Bulgarian Empire (1185–1396), the Kingdom of Bulgaria (1908–1946), the Serbian Empire (1346–1371), and the Tsardom of Russia (1547–1721). The first monarch to adopt the title of tsar was Simeon I of Bulgaria. Simeon II, the last tsar of Bulgaria, is the last person (and only living person as of 2026) to have held this title.

== Etymology ==
The title tsar is derived from the Latin title caesar, used for the Roman emperors. It entered the Slavic languages through the Gothic term kaisar and was used as an equivalent of the Greek term basileus, which referred to Byzantine emperors and the kings of the Bible.

The spelling "czar" is first recorded in Sigismund von Herberstein's Notes on Muscovite Affairs (1549), transliterated using German phonology. English and French changed the spelling from ⟨cz⟩ to ⟨ts⟩ in the 19th century to better reflect the pronunciation.

== Bulgaria ==
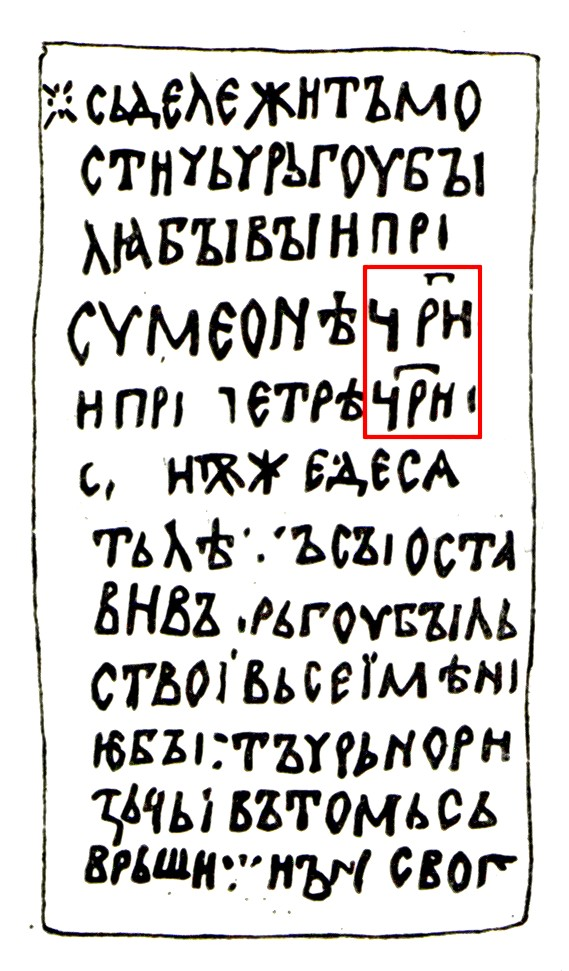
Mostich's epitaph uses the title tsar (outlined): "Here lies Mostich who was ichirgu-boil during the reigns of Tsar Simeon and Tsar Peter. At the age of eighty he forsook the rank of ichirgu boila and all of his possessions and became a monk. And so ended his life." (Museum of Preslav)

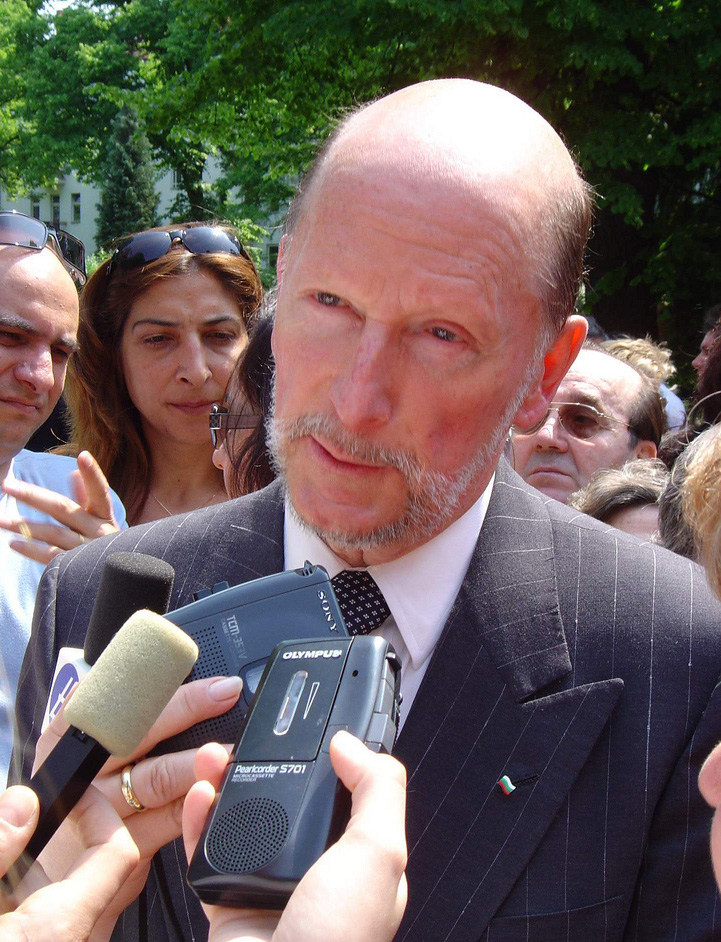
Simeon Saxe-Coburg-Gotha is the only living person to have borne the title of "tsar" (as Simeon II of Bulgaria).

In 705, Emperor Justinian II named Tervel of Bulgaria "caesar" (Greek: καῖσαρ), the first foreigner to receive this title, but his descendants continued to use the Bulgar title "Kanasubigi". The sainted Boris I is sometimes retrospectively referred to as tsar, because at his time Bulgaria was converted to Christianity. However, the title "tsar" (and its Byzantine Greek equivalent basileus) was actually adopted and used for the first time by his son Simeon I, following a makeshift imperial coronation performed by the Patriarch of Constantinople in 913. After an attempt by the Byzantine Empire to revoke this major diplomatic concession and a decade of intensive warfare, the imperial title of the Bulgarian ruler was recognized by the Byzantine government in 924 and again at the formal conclusion of peace in 927. Since in Byzantine political theory there was place for only two emperors, Eastern and Western (as in the Late Roman Empire), the Bulgarian ruler was crowned basileus as "a spiritual son" of the Byzantine basileus.

It has been hypothesized that Simeon's title was also recognized by a papal mission to Bulgaria in or shortly after 925, as a concession in exchange for a settlement in the Bulgarian-Croatian conflict or a possible attempt to return Bulgaria to union with Rome. Thus, in the later diplomatic correspondence conducted in 1199–1204 between the Bulgarian ruler Kaloyan and Pope Innocent III, Kaloyan—whose self-assumed Latin title was "Imperator Bulgarorum et Blachorum"—claims that the imperial crowns of Simeon I, his son Peter I, and Samuel were somehow derived from the papacy. The pope, however, only speaks of reges (kings) of Bulgaria in his replies, and eventually grants only that lesser title to Kaloyan, who nevertheless proceeds to thank the pope for the "imperial title" conferred upon him.

After Bulgaria's liberation from the Ottomans in 1878, its new monarchs were at first autonomous prince (knyaz). With the declaration of full independence, Ferdinand I of Bulgaria adopted the traditional title "tsar" in 1908 and it was used until the abolition of the monarchy in 1946. However, these titles were not generally perceived as equivalents of "emperor" any longer. In the Bulgarian ,as in the Greek vernacular, the meaning of the title had shifted (although Paisius' Slavonic-Bulgarian History (1760–1762) had still distinguished between the two concepts).

== Serbia ==
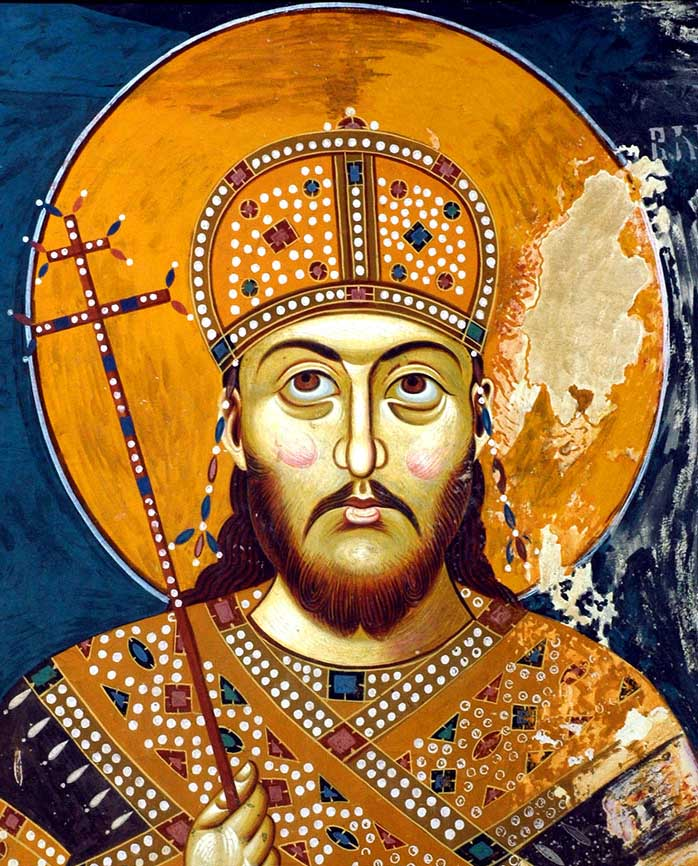
Tsar Dušan of Serbia

The title of tsar (Serbian car) was used officially by two monarchs, the previous monarchical title being that of king (kralj). In 1345, Stefan Dušan began to style himself "Emperor of Serbs and Greeks" (the Greek renderings read "basileus and autokrator of Serbs and Romans"), and was crowned as such in Skopje on Easter (April 16) 1346 by the newly elevated Serbian patriarch, alongside the Bulgarian patriarch and archbishop of Ohrid. On the same occasion, he had his wife Helena of Bulgaria crowned as empress and his son associated in power as king. When Dušan died in 1355, his son Stefan Uroš V became the next emperor. The new emperor's uncle Simeon Uroš (Siniša) contested the succession and claimed the same titles as a dynast in Thessaly. After his death around 1370, he was succeeded in his claims by his son John Uroš, who retired to a monastery in about 1373.

== Russia ==
The title tsar was used once by church officials of Kievan Rus' in the naming of Yaroslav the Wise, the grand prince of Kiev (r. 1019–1054). This may have related to Yaroslav's war against Byzantium and to his efforts to distance himself from Constantinople. However, other princes during the period of Kievan Rus' never styled themselves as tsars. The first Russian ruler to openly break with the khan of the Golden Horde, Mikhail of Tver (r. 1285–1318), assumed the title basileus ton Ros, as well as tsar. The title of tsar was used to denote a fullness of a sovereign's power and was reserved to the Holy Roman emperor and the Byzantine emperor, and later the khan of the Golden Horde. In literature, it was also used in a wider sense to indicate an illustrious ruler. Unlike its usage in Bulgarian and Serbian, where the title of tsar was used to challenge the power of the basileus, it only had a religious or moral value when attributed to a Russian prince throughout most of the medieval period.

The grand princes of Moscow began using the title in foreign relations. Following his assertion of independence from the khan in 1476, Ivan III (r. 1462–1505) adopted the title of sovereign of all Russia, and he later also started to use the title of tsar regularly in diplomatic relations with the West. From about 1480, he is designated as imperator in his Latin correspondence, as keyser in his correspondence with the Swedish regent, and as kejser in his correspondence with the Danish king, Teutonic Knights, and the Hanseatic League. Ivan's son Vasily III continued using these titles. Sigismund von Herberstein (1486–1566) observed that the titles of kaiser and imperator were attempts to render the Russian term tsar into German and Latin, respectively. The title-inflation related to Russia's growing ambitions to become an Orthodox "third Rome", after the fall of Constantinople in 1453. The monarch in Moscow was recognized as an emperor by Holy Roman Emperor Maximilian I in 1514. (Note: "Kayser vnnd Herscher aller Rewssen und Groszfürste zu Wolodimer" in the German text of Maximilian's letter; "Imperator et Dominator universorum Rhutenorum et Magnus Princeps Valadomerorum" in the Latin copy. Vasily III responded by referring to Maximilian as "Maximiliano Dei gratia Electo Romanorum Caesare", i.e., "Roman Caesar". Maximilian's letter was of great importance to Ivan the Terrible and to Peter the Great, when they wished to back up their titles of "tsar" and "emperor", respectively. Both monarchs demonstrated the letter to foreign ambassadors; Peter even referred to it when he proclaimed himself Emperor.)

However, the first Russian ruler to be formally crowned as tsar of all Russia was Ivan IV ("the Terrible"), in 1547. Some foreign ambassadors—namely, Herberstein (in 1516 and 1525), Daniel Printz a Buchau (in 1576 and 1578) and Just Juel (in 1709)—indicated that the word "tsar" should not be translated as "emperor", because it is applied by Russians to David, Solomon, and other Biblical kings, who are simple reges. (Note: Based on these accounts, the Popes repeatedly suggested to confer on the Russian monarchs the title of rex ("king"), if they would only ally themselves with the Pope. Such a proposal was made for the last time in 1550, i.e., three years after Ivan IV had crowned himself tsar. As early as 1489, Ivan III declined the papal offer, declaring that his regal authority did not require anyone's confirmation.) On the other hand, Jacques Margeret, a bodyguard of False Demetrius I (r. 1605–1606), argues that the title of "tsar" is more honorable for Muscovites than "kaiser" or "king" exactly because it was God and not some earthly potentate who ordained to apply it to David, Solomon, and other kings of Israel. Samuel Collins, a court physician to Tsar Alexis in 1659–66, styled the latter "Great Emperor", commenting that "as for the word Czar, it has so near relation to Cesar... that it may well be granted to signifie Emperour. The Russians would have in to be an higher Title than King, and yet they call David Czar, and our kings, Kirrols, probably from Carolus Quintus, whose history they have among them".

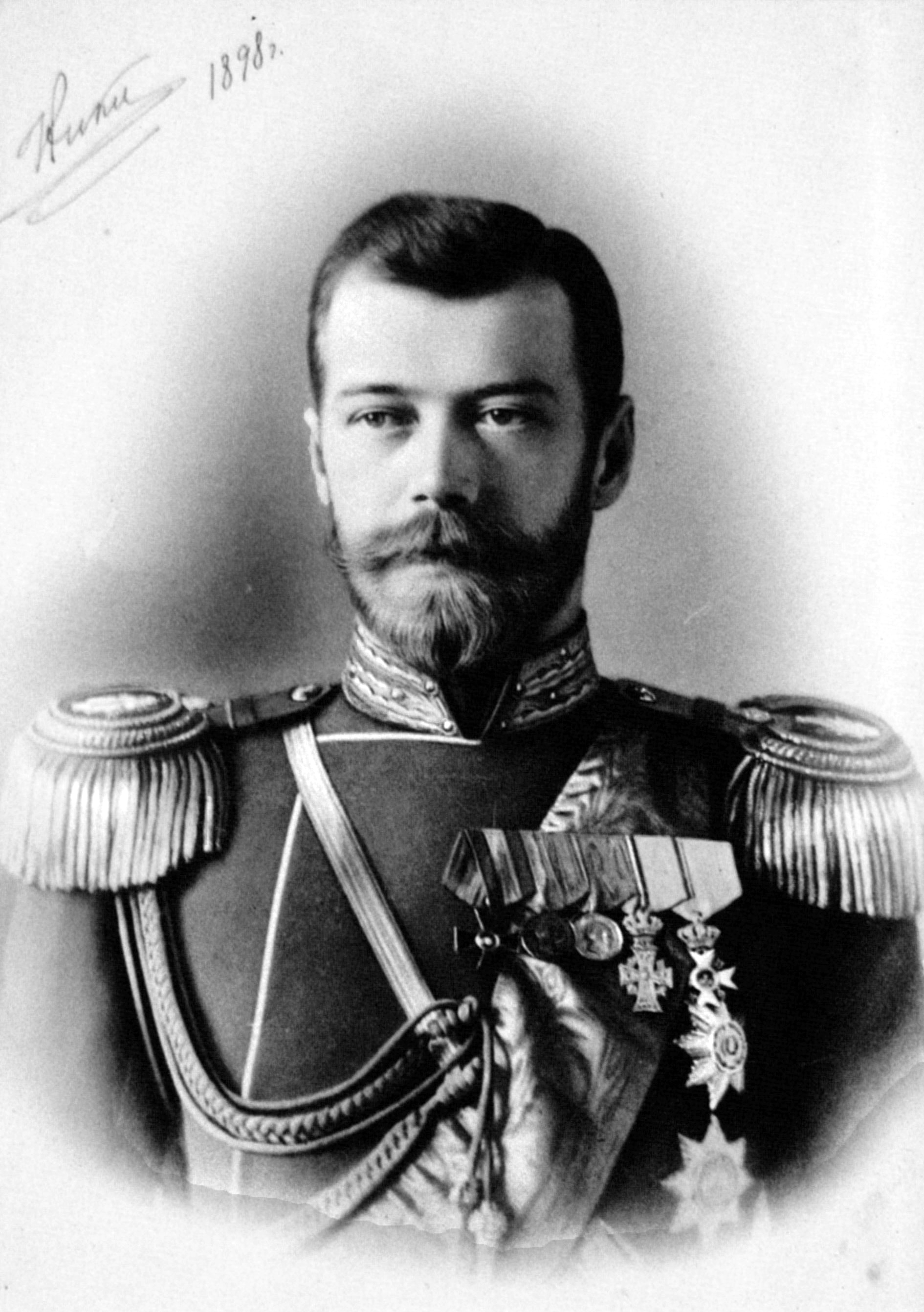
Nicholas II, the last Emperor of Russia.

In 1721 Peter the Great formally adopted the title of Emperor, but the title tsar remained in common usage, and also officially as part of various titles signifying rule over various states absorbed by the Russian monarchy (such as the former Tatar khanates and the Georgian Orthodox kingdom). In the 18th century, tsar was increasingly viewed as inferior to "emperor" or as highlighting the oriental side of the rank. Upon annexing Crimea in 1783, Catherine the Great adopted the hellenicized title "tsaritsa of Tauric Chersonesos", rather than "tsaritsa of the Crimea". By 1815, when Russia annexed a large part of Poland, the title had clearly come to be interpreted in Russia as the equivalent of Polish król ("king"), and the Russian emperor assumed the title "tsar of Poland".

Among the indigenous peoples of Siberia and the Muslims of the Volga region, Central Asia and the Caucasus, the autocracy of the Russian Empire often became identified with the image of the "White Tsar" (Russian: Белый царь).

By 1894, when Nicholas II ascended the throne, the full title of the Russian rulers was

"By the grace of God Almighty, the Emperor and Supreme Autocrat of all the Russias, Tsar of Moscow, Kiev, Vladimir, Novgorod, Kazan, Astrakhan, Poland, Siberia, Tauric Chersonese, and Georgia, Lord of Pskov, Grand Duke of Smolensk, Lithuania, Volhynia, Podolia and Finland, Prince of Estonia, Livonia, Courland and Semigalia, Samogitia, Białystok, Karelia, Tver, Yugra, Perm, Vyatka, Bulgaria, and other territories; Lord and Grand Duke of Nizhny Novgorod, Chernigov; Ruler of Ryazan, Polotsk, Rostov, Yaroslavl, Beloozero, Udoria, Obdoria, Kondia, Vitebsk, Mstislav, and all northern territories; Ruler of Iveria, Kartalinia, and the Kabardinian lands and Armenian territories; hereditary Ruler and Lord of the Cherkess and Mountain Princes and others; Lord of Turkestan, Heir of Norway, Duke of Schleswig-Holstein, Stormarn, Dithmarschen, Oldenburg".

== Montenegro ==
The title of tsar was only used one time in Montenegro, by Šćepan Mali, translated as "Stephen the Little". He was rumored to be former Russian emperor Peter III. He ruled the country of Montenegro as absolute monarch, and reigned as the tsar of Montenegro from 1768 until his death in 1773.

== Metaphorical uses ==
Like many lofty titles, such as mogul, tsar or czar has been used in English as a metaphor for positions of high authority since 1866 (referring to U.S. President Andrew Johnson), with a connotation of dictatorial powers and style, fitting since "autocrat" was an official title of the Russian emperor (informally referred to as 'the tsar'). Similarly, Speaker of the House Thomas Brackett Reed was called "Czar Reed" for his dictatorial control of the House of Representatives in the 1880s and 1890s.

In the United States and in the United Kingdom, the title "czar" is a colloquial term for certain high-level civil servants, such as the "drug czar" for the director of the Office of National Drug Control Policy (not to be confused with a drug baron), "terrorism czar" for a presidential advisor on terrorism policy, "cybersecurity czar" for the highest-ranking Department of Homeland Security official on computer security and information security policy, and "war czar" to oversee the wars in Iraq and Afghanistan. More specifically, a czar in the US government typically refers to a sub-cabinet-level advisor within the executive branch. One of the earliest known usages of the term was for Judge Kenesaw Mountain Landis, who was named commissioner of baseball, with broad powers to clean up the sport after it had been sullied by the Black Sox scandal of 1919.

== See also ==
- Succession of the Roman Empire
- List of Bulgarian monarchs
- List of Russian monarchs
- List of Serbian monarchs
- List of U.S. executive branch czars
- Tsarevets (fortress)
- Tsarina
- Tsarevich
- Tsesarevich
