= Conda =

Conda may refer to:

- Conda, Angola, a town and municipality in Angola
- Conda Canton, in Bolivia
- Conda, Idaho, a place in the United States
- Conda (package manager), a piece of software

== People with the name ==
- Cesar Conda, American lobbyist
- Aleksander Čonda, Slovenian motorcyclist

== See also ==
- Arena Condá, a stadium in Brazil
- Konda (disambiguation)
