= Mostich =

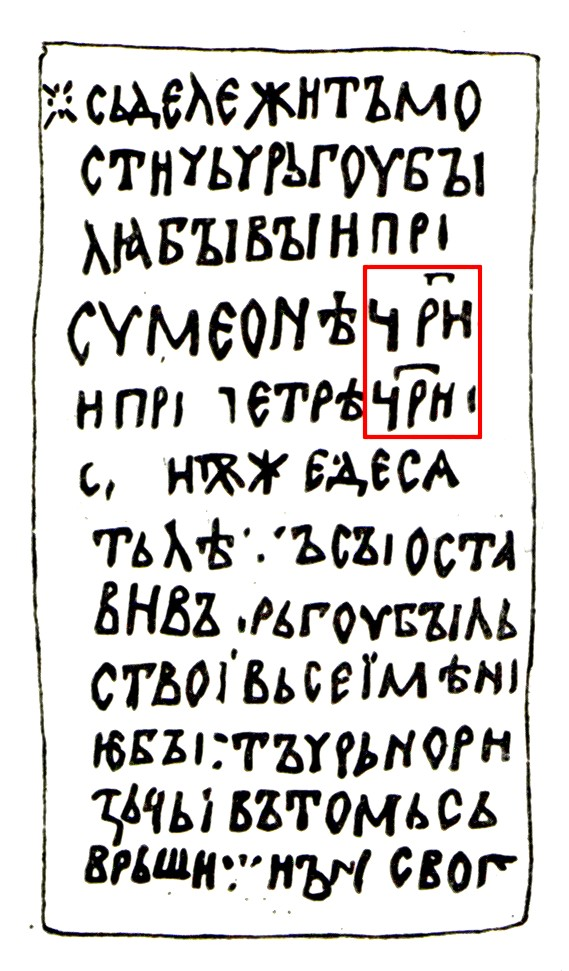
Redrawing of the epitaph of Mostich, with the first ever reference to the title "Tsar" highlighted.

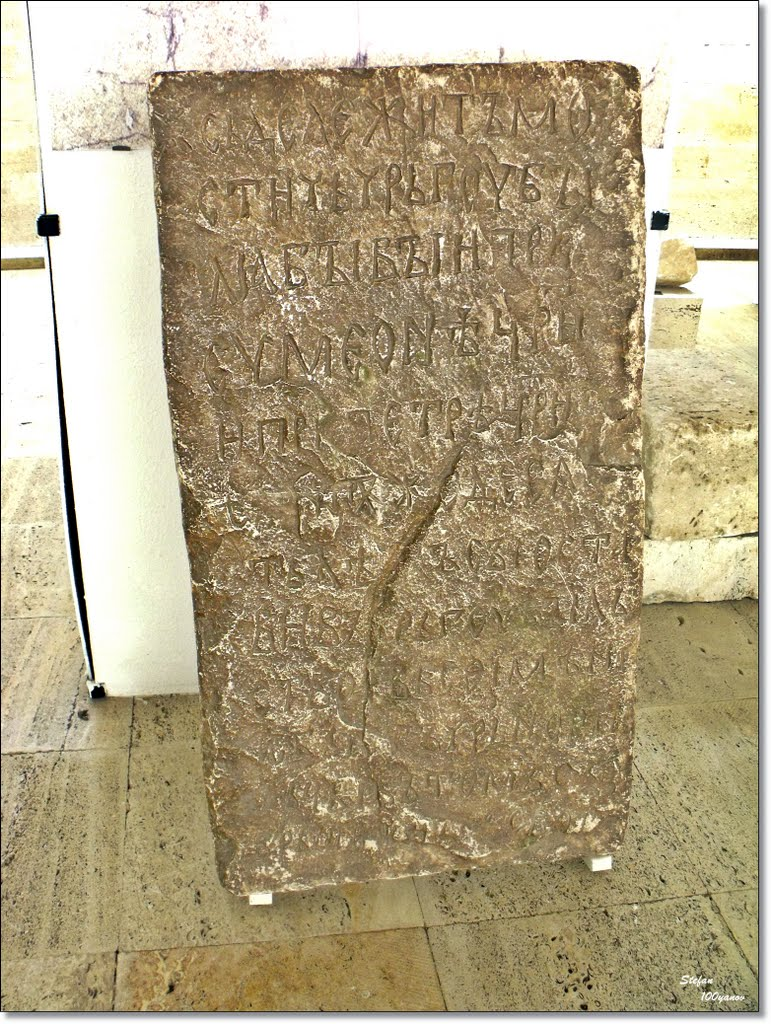
The tomb stone of Mostich

Mostich (Bulgarian: Мостич, Old Bulgarian: МОСТИЧЬ) was a high-ranking official in the 10th-century First Bulgarian Empire, during the rule of Simeon I and Peter I.

== Title ==
He bore the title of Ichirgu-boil and was most likely the commander of the state capital Preslav's garrison. It is only one of two mentions of that particular type of boil in the sources, the other one being the Presian inscription.

== Mostich epitaph inscription ==
Mostich is known from the 10th-century Old Bulgarian inscription on his tombstone, found in a church (now known as "Mostich's Church") in the Selishte area of Preslav, then the inner city of the Bulgarian capital. The tombstone was discovered in 1952 by Professor Stancho Vaklinov and is preserved in the National Archaeological Museum.

The inscription is Mostich's epitaph, indicating that he was buried in the church: his remains were also found, revealing that he was relatively short (165–170 cm). The text is notable for being one of the earliest sources mentioning the title "Цѣсарь" ("Tsesar").

It reads as follows:

Church Slavonic:
сьде лежитъ мо-
стичь чрьгоубъɪ-
ля бъɪвъɪи при
сумеонѣ ц︢ри
и при петрѣ ц︢ри
ос(м)иѭ же десѧ-
ть лѣтъ съɪ оста-
вивъ чрьгоубъɪлъ-
ство ї вьсе їмѣн-
иѥ бъɪстъ чрьнори-
зьць ї въ томь съ-
връши жизнь своѭ.

[Here lies Mostich, who was ichirgu-boil in the time of Tsar Simeon and Tsar Peter. At age of 80, leaving his post and property behind, he became a monk and so finished his life.]

— Original text after Stanchev et etc. 1955, translation after Petkov 2008

== Legacy ==
Mostich Hill on Rugged Island in the South Shetland Islands, Antarctica is named after Mostich.
