= Boyar =

Feudal aristocratic rank

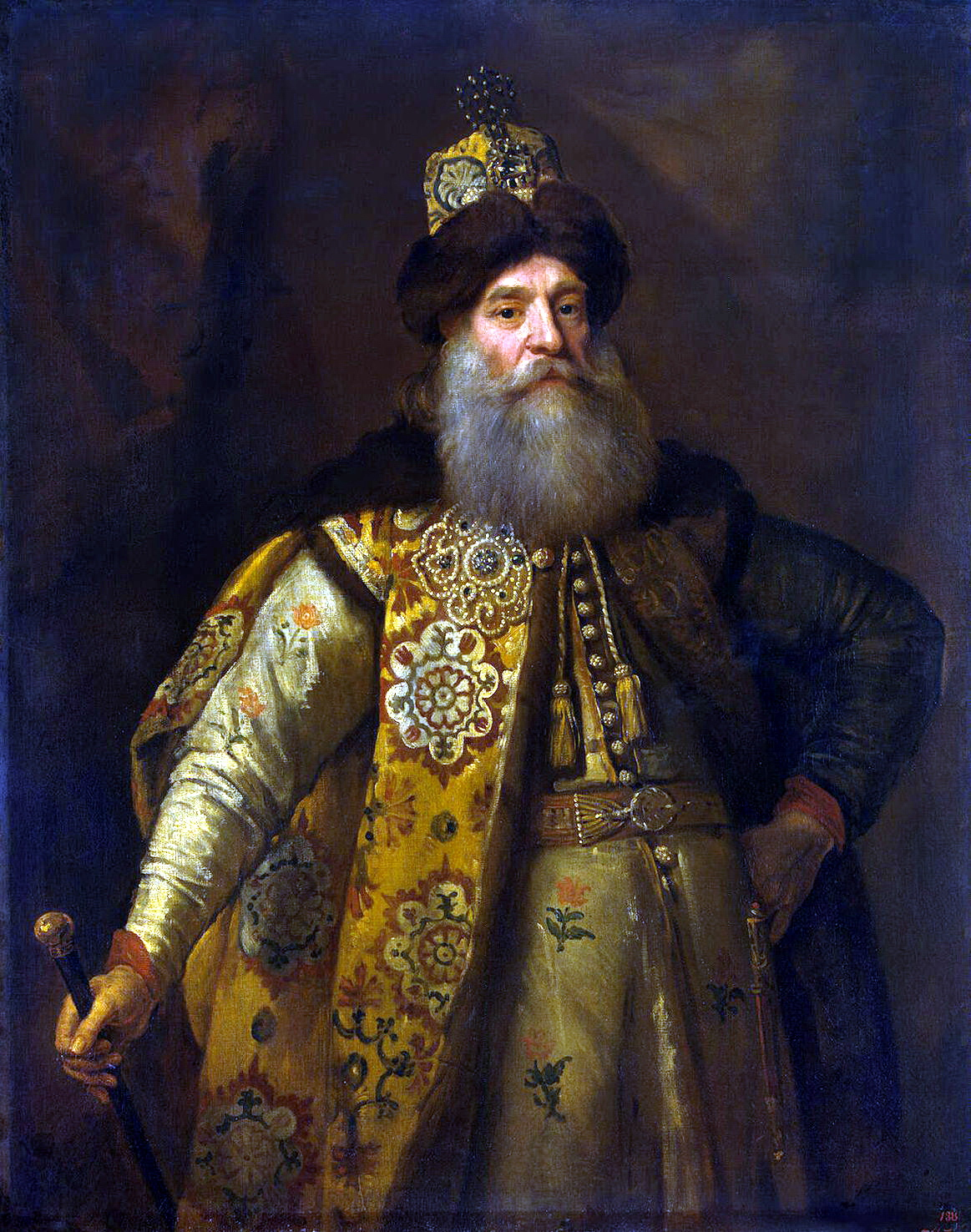
Portrait of Russian boyar Pyotr Potemkin by Godfrey Kneller

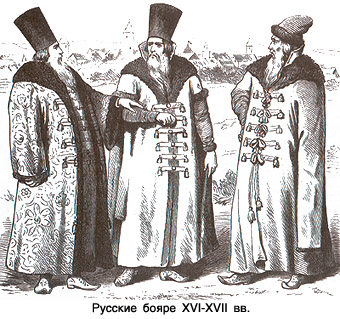
Russian boyars in the 16th–17th centuries

A boyar or bolyar (Note: Russian: боярин, romanized: bojárin; IPA: [bɐˈjærʲɪn]; Ukrainian: боя́рин, romanized: bojáryn; IPA: [bɔˈjaren]; Belarusian: бая́рын, romanized: bajáryn; IPA: [baˈjarɨn]; Bulgarian: боля́рин, romanized: boljárin; IPA: [boˈlʲa̟rin]; Macedonian: болјар, romanized: boljar; IPA: [ˈbɔʎar]; Serbian: бољарин / boljarin; IPA: [boʎarin]; Romanian: boier; IPA: [boˈjer]; Latvian: bajār; IPA: [bajɑːrs]; Estonian: bojaar; IPA: [ˈb̥ojɑːr]; German: Bojar; IPA: [boˈjaːɐ̯]) was a member of the highest rank of the feudal nobility in many Eastern European states, including Bulgaria, Kievan Rus' (and later Russia), Moldavia and Wallachia (and later Romania), Lithuania and among Baltic Germans. Comparable to Dukes/Grand Dukes, Boyars were second only to the ruling princes, grand princes or tsars from the 10th to the 17th centuries.

== Etymology ==
Variants of the word include Bulgarian: боляр, romanized: bolyar or болярин, bolyarin; Russian: боярин, romanized: boyarin, IPA: [bɐˈjærʲɪn], pl. бояре; Romanian: boier, IPA: [boˈjer]; and Greek: βογιάρος, romanized: vogiáros. Russian also has the form барин, barin, which is a shortening of boyarin.

The title boila is the predecessor or old form of the title Bolyar (the Bulgarian word for Boyar). Boila was a title held by some of the Bulgar aristocrats (mostly of regional governors and noble warriors) in the First Bulgarian Empire (681–1018). The plural form of boila, bolyare, is attested in Bulgar inscriptions and rendered as boilades or boliades in the Greek of Byzantine documents.

Multiple different etymologies of the word have been suggested by scholars. Bolyarin (болꙗринъ) is older form of the word, which, according to Max Vasmer, was borrowed into Old Church Slavonic from the Danubian Bulgar language, a Turkic language. Josef Markwart suggested the reconstructed original Turkic form *boyla äri (the second word from Turkic *ēr 'man'), which Vasmer rejects on phonetic grounds. Others have derived the word from Old Turkic bai 'noble, rich' (cf. bey) and -är ("man"), with the form bolyarin emerging under the influence of the Slavic word bolii (болии 'greater'), but Vasmer considered this hypothesis unconvincing.

== Bolyars in Bulgaria ==
The oldest Slavic form of boyar—bolyarin, pl. bolyari (Bulgarian: болярин, pl. боляри)—dates from the 10th century, and it is found in Bulgaria, also popular as old Bulgar title boila, which denoted a high aristocratic status among the Bulgars. It was probably built from Turkic bol- meaning many and yarin, yarki- meaning bright, enlightened. In support of this hypothesis is the 10th-century diplomatic protocol of the Byzantine Emperor Constantine VII, where the Bulgarian nobles are called boliades, while the 9th-century Bulgar sources call them boila.

A member of the nobility during the First Bulgarian Empire was called a boila, while in the Second Bulgarian Empire, the corresponding title became bolyar or bolyarin. Bolyar, as well as its predecessor, boila, was a hereditary title. The Bulgarian bolyars were divided into veliki ("great") and malki ("minor").

Presently in Bulgaria, the word bolyari is used as a nickname for the inhabitants of Veliko Tarnovo—once the capital of the Second Bulgarian Empire.

== Boyars in Serbia ==
In medieval Serbia, the rank of the boyars (Боjари, bojari) was equivalent to the rank of the baron; meaning "free warrior" (or "free man" in general), it was the first rank after the non-free peasants or serfs. The etymology of the term comes from the word battle (бој, boj). The boyars of Serbia were literally "men for the battle" or the warrior class, in contrast to the peasants. They could own land but were obliged to defend it and fight for the king. With the rule of the Ottoman Empire after 1450, the Ottoman as well as the Austro-Hungarian terms exchanged the Serbian one. Today, it is an archaic term representing the aristocracy (племство, plemstvo).

== Boyars in Rus' ==
From the 9th to 13th century, boyars wielded considerable power through their military support of the Rus's princes. Power and prestige of many of them, however, soon came to depend almost completely on service to the state, family history of service and, to a lesser extent, land ownership. Boyars of Kievan Rus were visually very similar to knights, but after the Mongol invasion, their cultural links were mostly lost.

The boyars occupied the highest state offices and, through a council (duma), advised the grand duke. They received extensive grants of land and, as members of the Boyars' Duma, were the major legislators of Kievan Rus'.

After the Mongol invasion in the 13th century, the boyars from western and southern parts of Kievan Rus' (modern Belarus and Ukraine) were incorporated into Lithuanian and Polish nobility (szlachta). In the 16th and 17th centuries, many of those Rus boyars who failed to get the status of a nobleman actively participated in the formation of the Cossack army.

Boyars in Novgorod and Pskov formed a sort of republic, where the power of princes (knyaz) was strongly limited until the conquest by Moscow. Boyars kept their influence in the Russian principalities of Vladimir, Tver and Moscow. Only after the centralization of power by Moscow was the power of the boyars diminished.

=== Tsardom of Russia ===
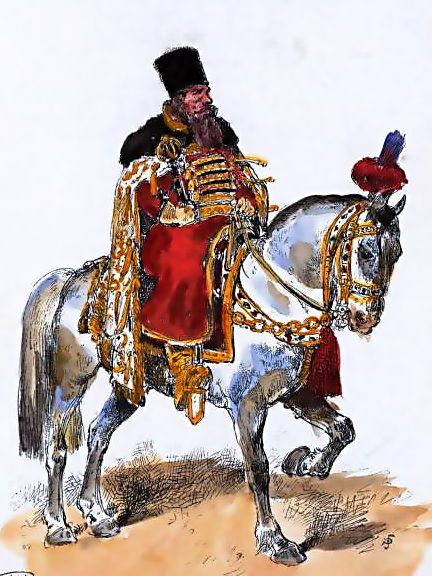
A mounted Russian boyar from the 17th century

During the 14th and 15th centuries, the boyars of Moscow had considerable influence that continued from the Muscovy period. However, starting with the reign of Ivan III, the boyars were starting to lose that influence to the authoritative tsars in Muscovy. Because of Ivan III's expansionist policies, administrative changes were needed in order to ease the burden of governing Muscovy. Small principalities knew their loyal subjects by name, but after the consolidation of territories under Ivan, familial loyalty and friendship with the boyar's subjects turned those same subjects into administrative lists. The face of provincial rule disappeared.

Boyar membership, until the 16th century, did not necessarily require one to be Russian, or even Orthodox, as historians note that many boyars came from places like Lithuania or the Nogais, and some remained Muslims for a generation after the Mongols were ousted. What is interesting about the boyars is their implied duties. Because boyars were not constitutionally instituted, much of their powers and duties came from agreements signed between princes. Agreements, such as one between Ivan III and Mikhail Borisovich in 1484 showed how allegiances needed to be earned and secured, rather than implied and enforced.

Instead of the grand prince personally overseeing his lands, he had to rely on his captains and close advisors to oversee day-to-day operations. Instead of the great voice the boyars had previously in their advisory roles, they now had less bargaining power and mobility. They answered questions posed by the grand prince, and Ivan III even made sure to get their approval on special events, such as his marriage to Zoe Paleologa, or the attack on Novgorod. This was to ensure the boyars and their military power remained loyal to the tsar.

The grand duke also made sure that peasants could not leave the princes' lands, or from one place to another, in the mid-1400s, effectively establishing serfdom. The boyars gained rewards and gifts as well. Some boyars were sent to regions as governors, and could “feed off” the locals in this way. Still, by the end of the 15th century, boyar membership had declined, and merit rather than family background decided who became a boyar. When Ivan IV became the tsar, more radical changes were implemented to limit boyar influence.

Ivan IV became the grand prince of all Muscovy in 1533 at the age of three, but various boyar factions tried to compete for control of the regency. When Ivan IV came to power in 1547, much more of the boyars' independent political power became obsolete. The independence and autonomy experienced by the princes of the regions in Muscovy was abolished under Ivan IV by the end of the sixteenth century, making them "the prince's sons", or just simple boyars serving the Grand Prince. Ivan IV divided Muscovy into two parts in 1565, and in the private part, the terror began.

The boyars attempted to band together and resist, but instead of constitutionally establishing their role in government, Ivan IV ruthlessly crushed the boyar opposition with the use of the oprichnina terror purges. Land grants were also given to subjects that provided military service, and soon this type of land grant became the more common compared to inherited land among the boyars. Ivan IV consolidated his power, centralized royal power, and made every effort possible to curb the influence of the princes.

After Ivan IV, a time of troubles began when his son Fedor died without an heir, ending the Rurik dynasty. The boyar Boris Godunov tried to proclaim himself tsar, but several boyar factions refused to recognize him. The chaos continued after the first False Dmitriy gained the throne, and civil war erupted. When the Romanovs took over, the seventeenth century became one filled with administrative reform. A comprehensive legal code was introduced, and a merging of the boyars into the elite bureaucracy was beginning to form.

By the end of the Time of Troubles, the boyars had lost nearly all independent power. Instead of going to Moscow to gain more power, the boyars felt defeated, and felt compelled to go to Moscow to maintain a united and strong Russia. Second, the boyars lost their independent principalities, where they maintained all their power, and instead governed districts and regions under the grand prince of the time. Boyars also lost their advisory influence over the grand prince with tools such as the duma, and instead the grand prince no longer felt compelled to listen to the demands of the boyars. The tsar no longer feared losing their military support, and unification of Muscovy became paramount in importance. With Peter the Great, the final nail in the coffin happened for the boyars' power, and they would never recover from his administrative reforms.

Peter the Great, who took power in 1697, took it upon himself to westernize Russia, and catch it up with the modern world. After the revolt of the streltsy regiments in 1698, Peter the Great returned to Russia, forcing government officials and those that were financially able to have clean shaven faces and wear Western clothing. Peter also reformed the judicial system, and created a senate with members appointed by him, replacing the old council of boyars that originally advised the tsar. This move he made was one of many that dismantled the powers and status the boyars previously possessed.

Peter was driving out the conservative and religious faction of the boyars out of the courts, and instead using both foreign and Russian officials to fill the administrative system. Several boyars, as well as other nobility, spoke out against these reforms, including historian Mikhail Shcherbatov, who stated that the reforms Peter made helped destroy Russian tradition, and created people that tried to "worm their way up, by flattering and humoring the monarch and the grandees in every way." Still, the reforms continued, as by this point, the tsar possessed too much power, and Russia became an absolute monarchy more and more with each ruler.

=== Galicia ===
The Galician nobility originally were called boyars. With the annexation of Galicia by the Kingdom of Poland as the result of the Galicia-Volhynia wars, local boyars were equated since 1430 in rights along with Polish nobility (szlachta). A great number of boyars fled to the lands of Great Duchy of Lithuania in Volhynia and Podolia.

== Boyars in Moldavia and Wallachia ==
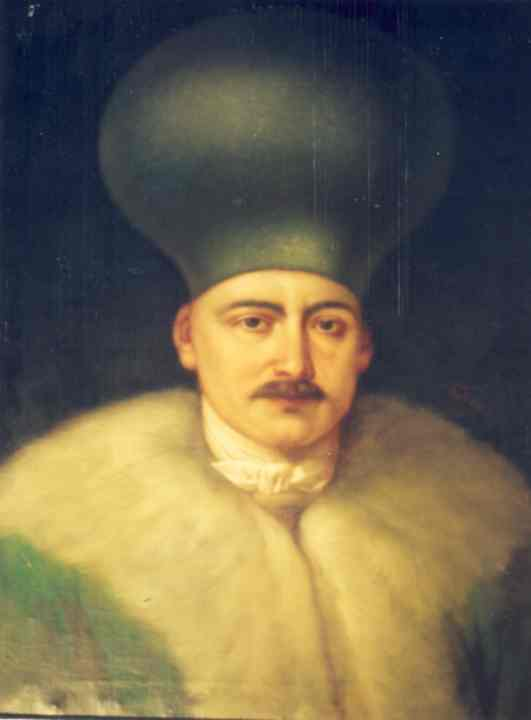
Wallachian vornic Șerban Grădișteanu wearing an işlic, an indication of his boyar rank

In the Carpathian regions inhabited by present day Romanians, the boyar (boier) class emerged from the chiefs (named cneaz ("leader") or jude ("judge") in the areas north of the Danube, and celnic south of the river) of rural communities in the early Middle Ages, who made their judicial and administrative attributions hereditary and gradually expanded them upon other communities. They were approved by the Ottoman Empire, which had suzerainty over the area. After the appearance of more advanced political structures in the area, their privileged status had to be confirmed by the central power, which used this prerogative to include in the boyar class individuals that distinguished themselves in the military or civilian functions they performed, by allocating them lands from the princely domains.

Historian Djuvara explained the hypotheses concerning the origin of the Romanians, such as advancing the theory that the vast majority of the nobility in the medieval states that made up the territory of modern-day Romania was of Cuman origin and not Romanian: "Romanians were called the black Cumans".

=== The boyar condition ===
The Romanian social hierarchy was composed of boyar, mazil (turkish: mazul), răzeș (yeoman, freedman) and rumân (serf). Being a boyar implied three things: being a land-owner, having serfs, and having a military and/or administrative function. A boyar could have a state function and/or a court function. These functions were called dregătorie or boierie. Only the prince had the power to assign a boierie. Landowners with serfs but no function were categorized as mazil but were still considered to be of noble origin (din os boieresc, literally "of boyar bone"). Small landowners who possessed a domain without distinction (devălmășie) were called moșneni, răzeși, while the serfs (indentured servants) were called rumâni.

=== Origin ===
Although functions could only be accorded by the prince and were not hereditary, land possession was hereditary. The prince could give land to somebody but could not take it from its possessor except for serious reasons such as treason. Therefore, there were two kinds of boyars: those whose families, as chiefs of the ancient rural communities, had held land before the formation of the feudal states, such that the prince merely confirmed their preexisting status as landowners; and those who acquired their domain from a princely donation or who had inherited it from an ancestor who acquired it through such a donation (cf. the distinction between Uradel and Briefadel in the Holy Roman Empire and in its feudal successor regimes). During the Phanariot régime, there were also boyars who had no land at all, but only a function. This way, the number of boyars could be increased, by selling functions to those who could afford them.

=== Hierarchy ===
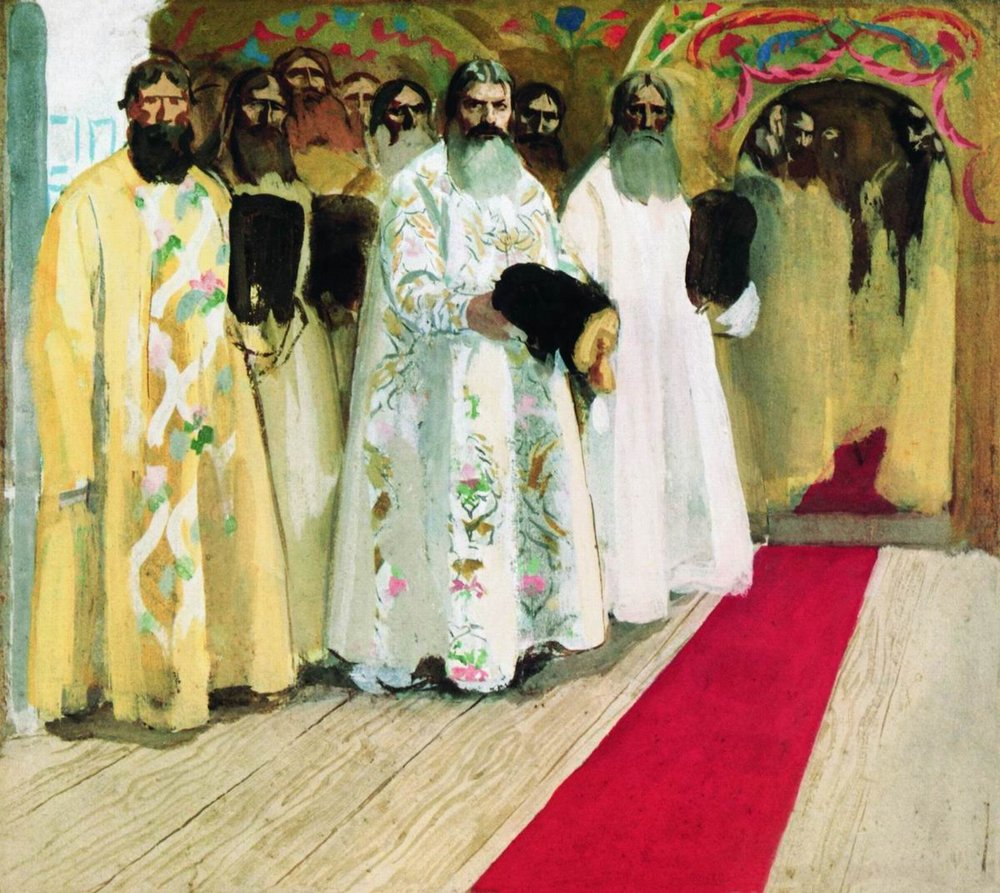
Boyars with gorlatnaya hats in a painting by Andrei Ryabushkin. The higher hats indicated higher social status.

The close alliance between the boyar condition and the military-administrative functions led to a confusion, aggravated by the Phanariots: these functions began to be considered as noble titles, like in the Occident. In fact, this was not at all the case. Traditionally, the boyars were organized in three states: boyars of the first, second, and third states. For example, there was a first or a grand postelnic, a second postelnic, and a third postelnic, each one with his different obligations and rights.

The difference of condition was visible even in the vestimentation or physical aspect. Only the boyars of the first state had the right, for example, to grow a beard, the rest being entitled only to a mustache. Within the class of the boyars of the first state, there was the subclass of the "grand boyars". Those were great landowners who also had some very high functions, such as the function of great vornic. Above those grand boyars was only the prince.

=== The prince ===
Usually a prince was a boyar before his election or appointment as prince, but this was not an absolute condition. Initially, only princely descendants could be elected princes. During the Phanariot epoch, however, any man could be a prince if appointed by the sultan, and rich enough to buy this appointment from the grand vizier. During the Ottoman suzerainty, and especially during the Phanariot régime, the title of Prince became an administrative function within the imperial Ottoman hierarchy, and thus the ultimate form of boyardness. The title of Prince of Wallachia or Moldavia was equivalent in dignity to that of a Pasha with two horse-tails.

== Cultural references ==
Norwegian composer Johan Halvorsen wrote a march entitled "Bojarenes inntogsmarsj" ("Entry March of the Boyars"), known in Norway as the signal tune for the radio programme Ønskekonserten. Edvard Grieg arranged it for solo piano. August Strindberg requests that this piece be played during his play The Dance of Death, Part One.

== See also ==
- Magnate
- Okolnichy
- Russian nobility
- Freiherr - similar Allodial title in Germanic Europe
- Russian rank titles during the sixteenth and seventeenth centuries
