= Konda (river) =

River in Russia

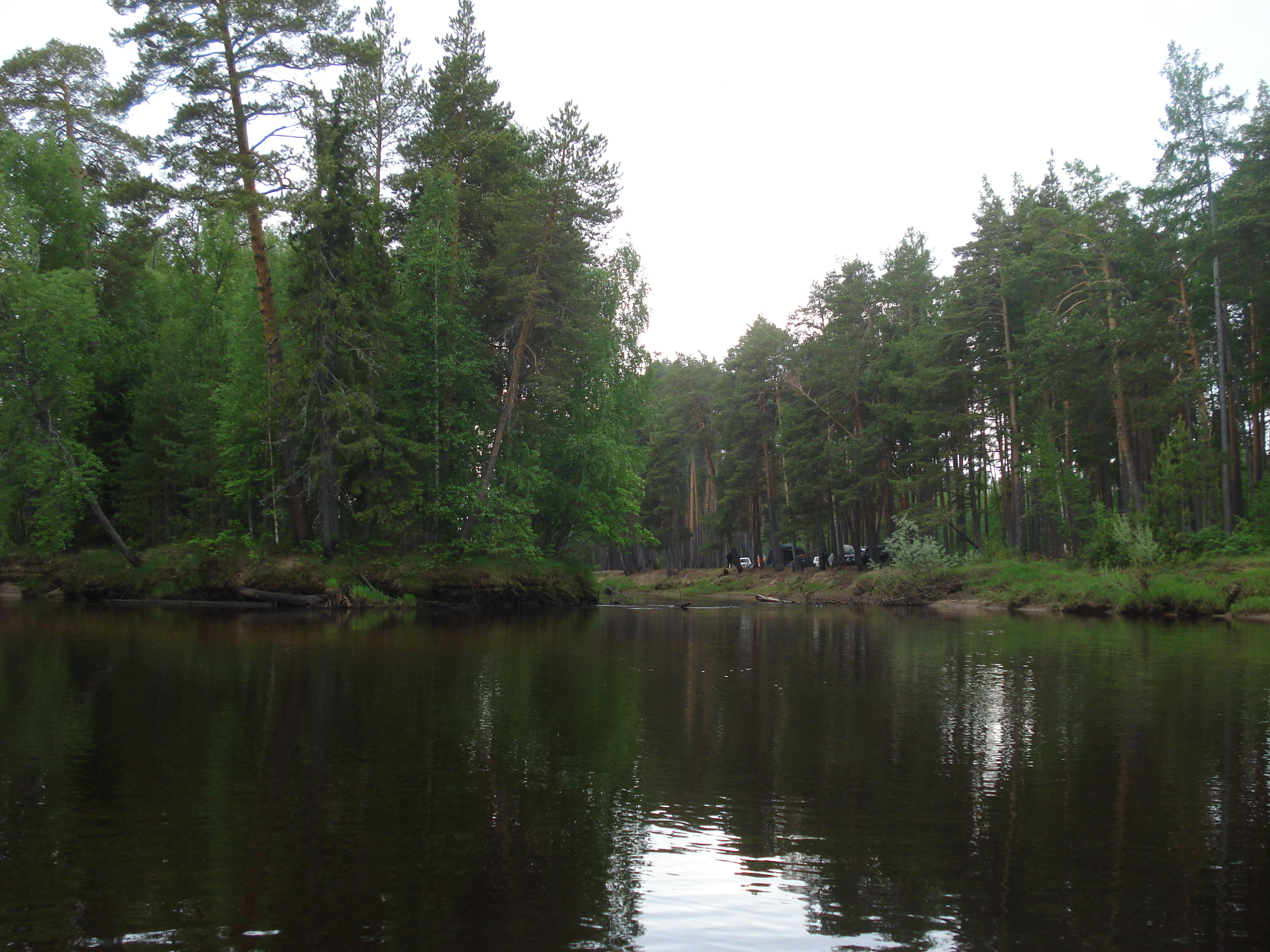

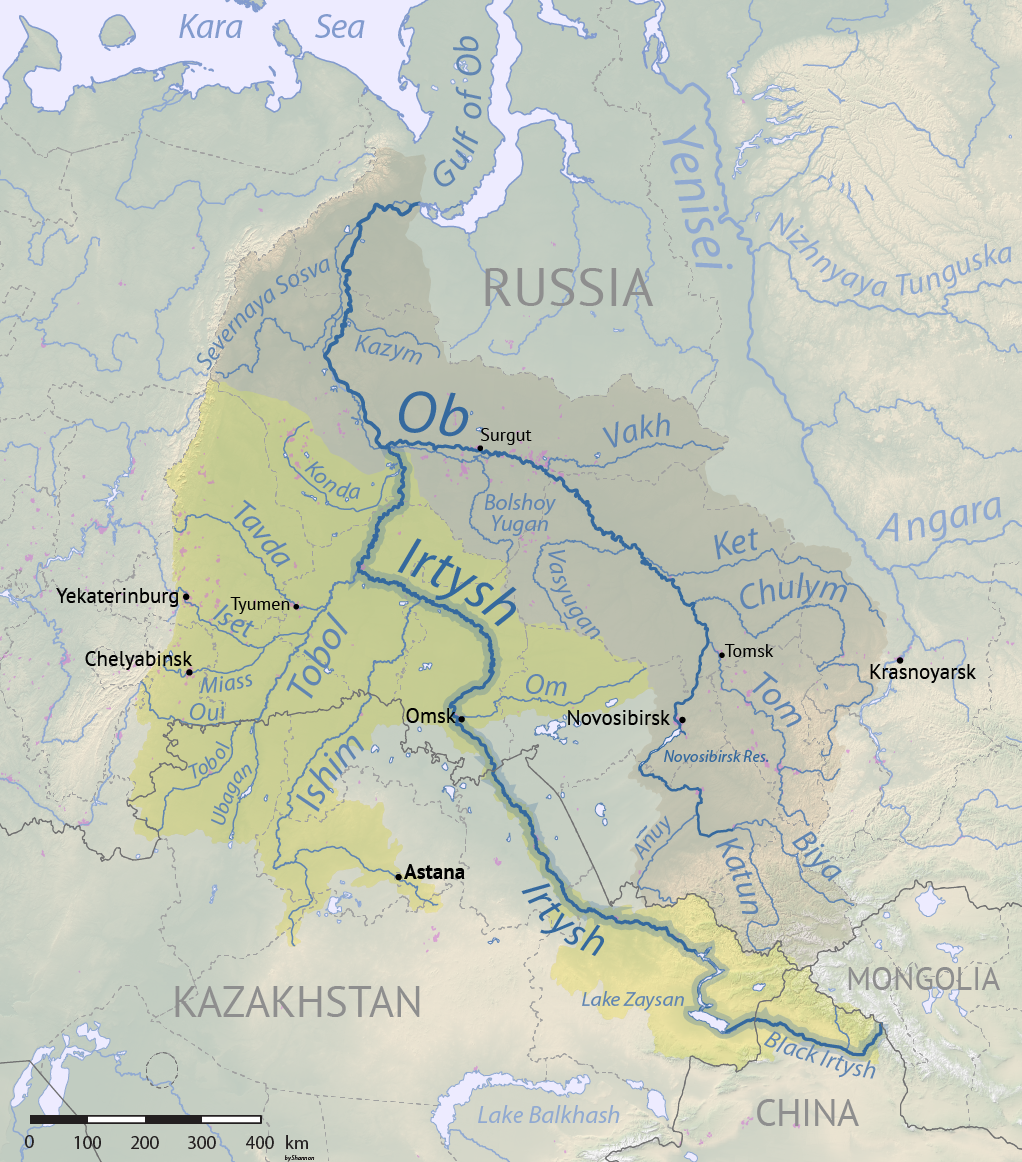
- The Konda in the Irtysh basin

Location
- Country: Russia
- Region: Khanty-Mansi Autonomous Okrug

Physical characteristics
- Source: West Siberian Plain
  - location: Sovetsky District
  - coordinates: 61°26′49″N 64°29′53″E
  - elevation: 123 m (404 ft)
- Mouth: Irtysh
  - location: Tiuli, Khanty-Mansiysky District
  - coordinates: 60°42′23″N 69°40′13″E
  - elevation: 20 m (66 ft)
- Length: 1,097 km (682 mi)
- Basin size: 72,800 km^{2} (28,100 sq mi)

Basin features
- Progression: Irtysh→ Ob→ Kara Sea
- Tributaries
  - left: Mulymya, Bolshoy Tap, Yukonda, Kama
  - right: Yevra, Kuma

The Konda (Russian: Конда) is a river in the Khanty–Mansia region of Russia. The town of Uray and the Shaimskoye oil field are along the Konda.

It is a left tributary of the Irtysh. It is 1,097 kilometres (682 mi) long with a drainage basin of 72,800 square kilometres (28,100 mi^{2}). The river has its sources on the western edge of the West Siberian Plain. The average discharge 164 kilometres (102 mi) from its mouth is 231 cubic metres per second (8,200 cu ft/s), with a maximum of 1,220 cubic metres per second (43,000 cu ft/s) and a minimum of 36.1 cubic metres per second (1,270 cu ft/s). The river is frozen over from late October to late April.

Great Soviet Encyclopedia ways that tts main tributaries are from the left: Мулымья Mulymya, Большой Тап Bolshoy Tap, Юконда Yukonda and Кама Kama, and from the right: Евра Yevra and Кума Kuma.

The Konda region, or Kondia, is one of the many provinces mentioned in the full official title of Russian tsars.
