= Pelym =

Pelym (Russian: Пелым) is the name of several inhabited localities in Russia.

Urban localities

- Pelym, Ivdel, Sverdlovsk Oblast, a work settlement under the administrative jurisdiction of the city of Ivdel, Sverdlovsk Oblast

Rural localities

- Pelym, Perm Krai, a selo in Kochyovsky District of Perm Krai
- Pelym, Garinsky District, Sverdlovsk Oblast, formerly an important city, now a village in Garinsky District, Sverdlovsk Oblast
