= Golden Woman =

Idol statue goddess

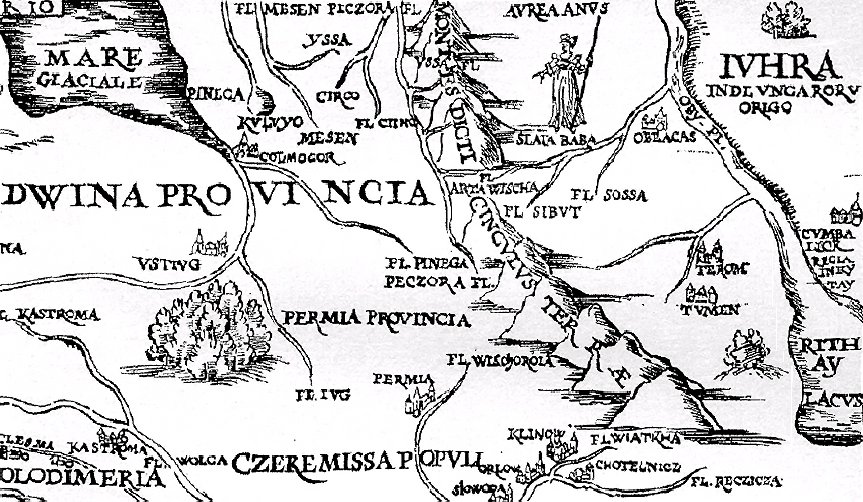
A fragment of the map of Moscovia by Sigismund von Herberstein marking the Golden Woman (Slata Baba)

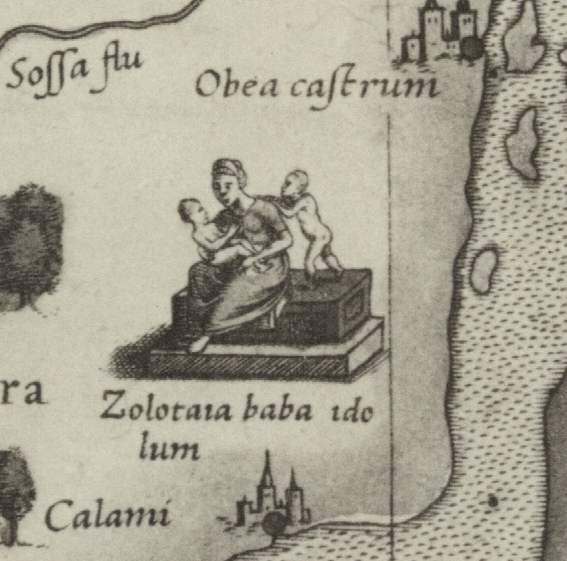
Zolotaia Baba Idolum from Gerard Mercator's 1569 world map

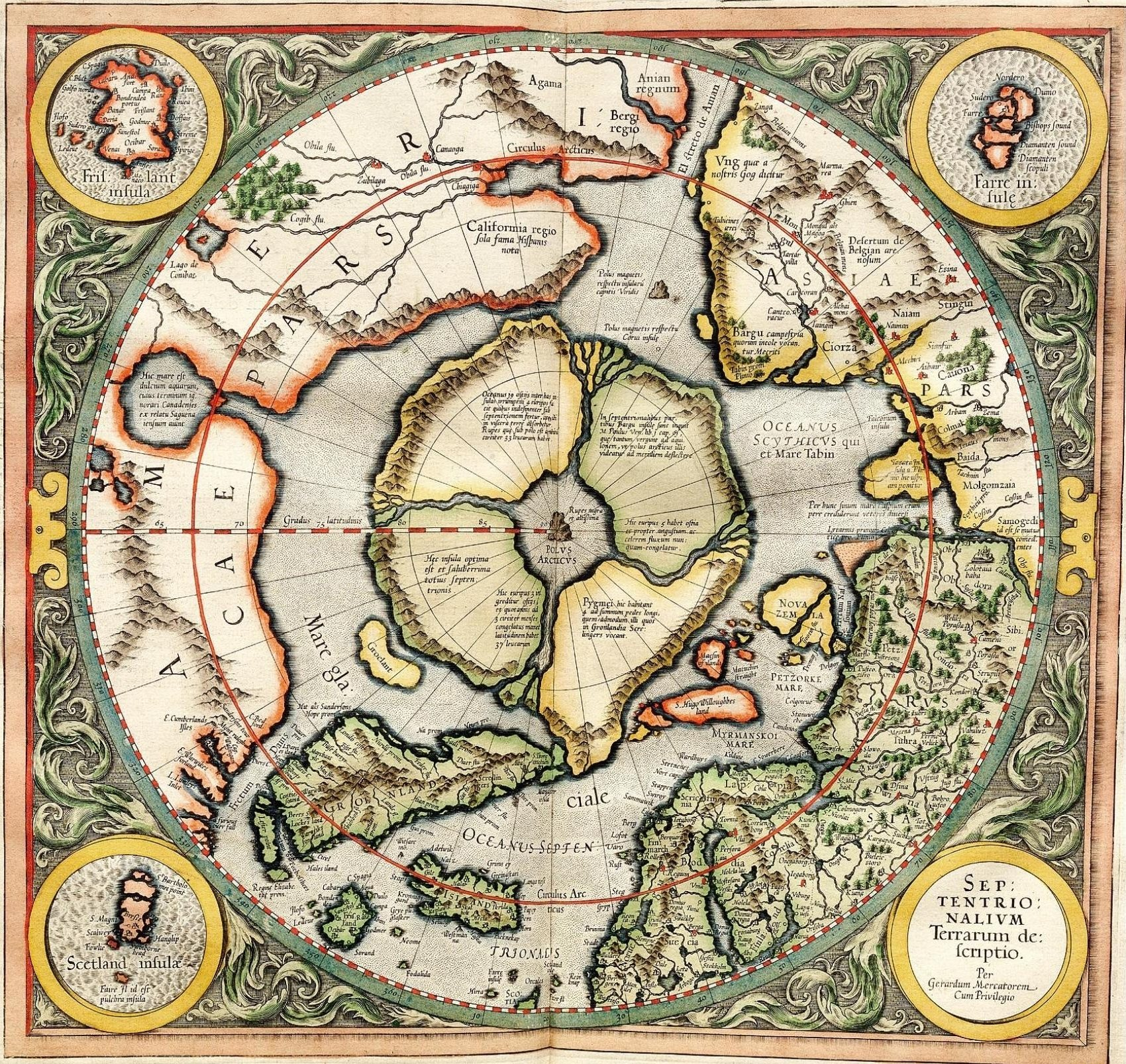
Mercator's 1595 map of the Arctic, including Zolotaia Baba on the right

The Golden Woman, Golden Hag, or Golden Lady (Russian: Золотая баба, romanized: Zolotaya baba; archaic name: Злата баба, Zlata baba; Latin: aurea anus, aurea vetula), is a legendary idol, an alleged item of worship of the indigenous peoples of northeastern Europe and northwestern Siberia. Early references about it are contradictory, both in its geographical location and in description.

Maciej Miechowita in his Tractatus de duabus Sarmatis Europiana et Asiana et de contentis in eis (1517) described it as follows:

Accipiat quinto, quod post terram Viatka nuncupatam in Scythiam penetrando iacet magnum idolum Zlota baba, quod interpretatum sonat aurea anus seu vetula, quod gentes vicinae colunt et venerantur, nec aliquis in proximo gradiens aut feras agitando et in venatione sectando vacuus et sine oblatione pertransit, quinimo si munus nobile deest, pellem aut saltem de veste extractum pilum in offertorium idolo proicit et inclinando se cum reverentia pertransit.

Translated:

"Let it be received fifth [on the list], that beyond the land called Viatka, entering into Scythia, there stands a great idol called Zlota baba, which translated means 'golden old woman' or 'golden crone', which the neighboring peoples worship and venerate. No one passing nearby, whether hunting wild animals or pursuing game, goes by empty-handed or without making an offering. Indeed, if a noble gift is lacking, the person throws even a skin or at least a hair pulled from their clothing as an offering to the idol, and passes by with a bow and reverence."

Giles Fletcher in his Of the Russe Common Wealth (1591) writes that some maps and descriptions of countries, e.g., one by Herberstein, mention a "Slata Baba, or the golden hagge", an idol in the shape of an old woman who serves as an oracle for indigenous priests. However Fletcher sees this as a myth. He further writes that in Obdoria, near the mouth of Ob River there is a rock of shape resembling a ragged woman bearing a child in her hands, and Obdorian Samoyeds use it in their pagan sorcery.

== See also ==
- Yugra
