= Boila =

Noble title

Boila (Greek: βοιλα; Old Turkic: 𐰉𐰆𐰖𐰞𐰀, romanized: Boyla) was a title worn by some of the Bulgar and Göktürk aristocrats (mostly of regional governors and noble warriors) in the early First Bulgarian Empire (681-1018) and Second Turkic Khaganate (682-744). For the linguists, the title "Boila" is the predecessor or an old form of the title "Bolyar". The Boil(a)s were two types: internal ("great") and external ("small"). The internal Boil(a)s were governors of the Comitates (administrative regions). Most of the popular linguists believe that "Boila" has Old Turkic origin and the meaning of the word can be translated as "noble".

The title appears on the 7th/8th century Buyla inscription, with the Greek spelling ΒΟΥΗΛΑ (buila).

== See also ==
- Ichirgu-boila
- Bolyar
- Buyla inscription
