= Cesar Conda =

American political consultants

Cesar Conda is a former lobbyist, and was the domestic policy chief adviser to Vice President Dick Cheney, and Marco Rubio's chief of staff from 2011 to 2014.

Conda has worked to promote conservative policies, and was instrumental in devising the Bush-era tax cuts.

== Career history ==
Conda is a founding Principal and Executive Committee Member of Navigators Global LLC. After serving as an adviser for the 1996 Dole-Kemp presidential campaign, he was an assistant to Vice President Dick Cheney for Domestic Policy from 2001 to 2003. Following that role, he served as a Senior Economic Policy Adviser on the 2008 Mitt Romney presidential campaign as well as a Policy Adviser to Marco Rubio during his 2010 Senate Campaign.

Conda has also served as a Legislative Director to Sen. Spencer Abraham (R-Mich.) and an Economic Analyst for the U.S. Chamber of Commerce as well as a Minority Staff Director of the Senate Small Business Committee under Sen. Bob Kasten (R-Wis).
