= Pelym, Perm Krai =

Pelym Пелым
- Selo
- Location within Perm Krai Location within Russia
- Coordinates: 59°43′N 54°22′E
- Country: Russia
- Region: Perm Krai
- District: Kochyovsky District
- Time zone: UTC+5:00

Pelym (Russian: Пелым) is a rural locality (a selo) and the administrative center of Pelymskoye Rural Settlement, Kochyovsky District, Perm Krai, Russia. The population was 720 as of 2010. There are 11 streets.

== Geography ==
Pelym is located 16 km north of Kochyovo (the district's administrative centre) by road. Kuzmino is the nearest rural locality.
