= Konda, South Konawe =

Konda
- Kecamatan
- Interactive map of Konda
- Country: Indonesia
- Province: Southeast Sulawesi
- Regency: South Konawe

Population (2020)
  - Total: 22,016
- Time zone: UTC+8 (WITA)
- Postal code: 93874

Konda is a kecamatan in South Konawe, Southeast Sulawesi, Indonesia. Konda is located 55 kilometres north of Andoolo, the capital of South Konawe Regency, and 15 kilometres from Kendari. Its capital is located in kelurahan Konda.
