= South Konawe Regency =

Regency in Southeast Sulawesi, Indonesia

South Konawe Regency Kabupaten Konawe Selatan
- Regency
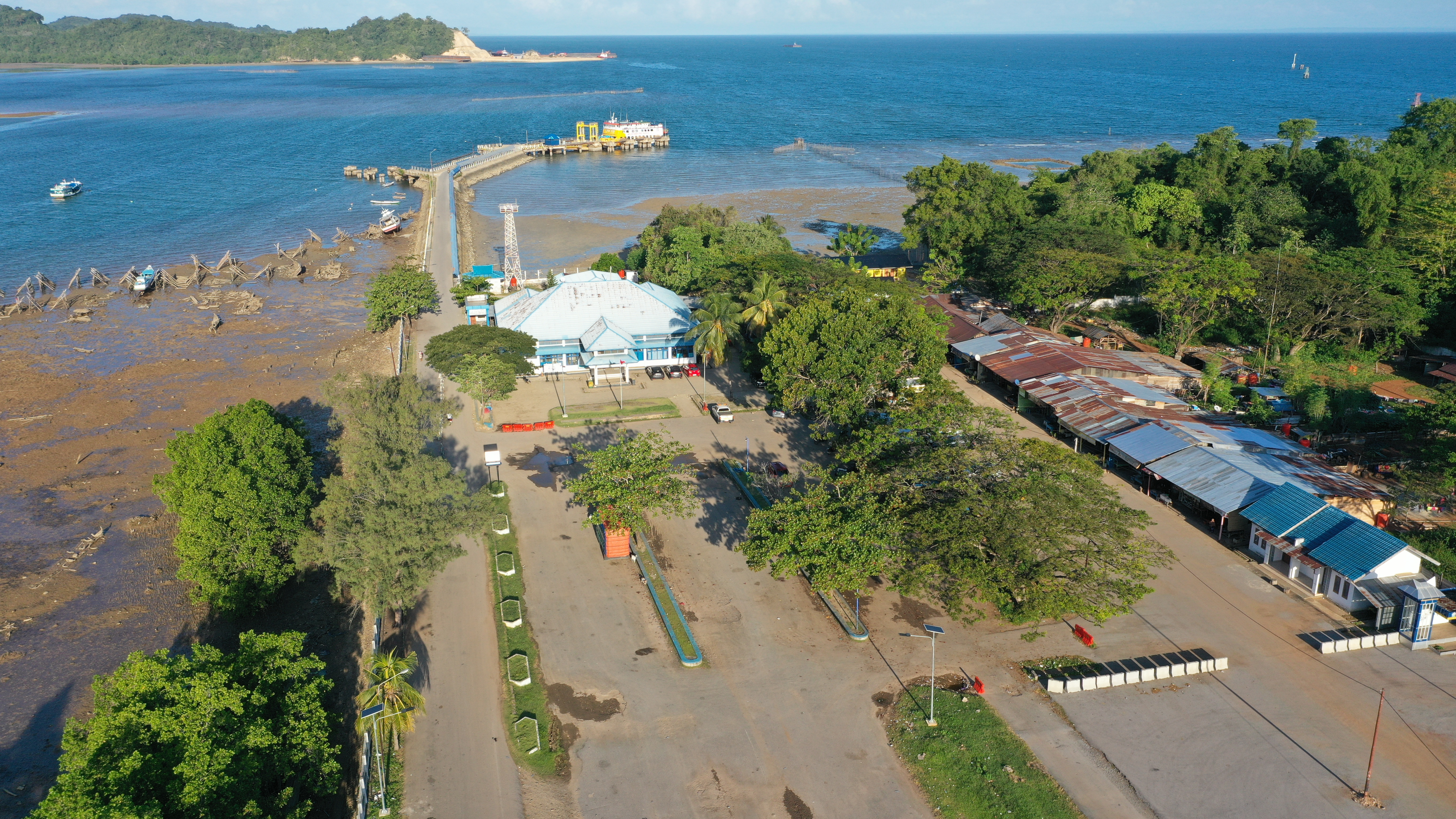
- Port of Torobulu

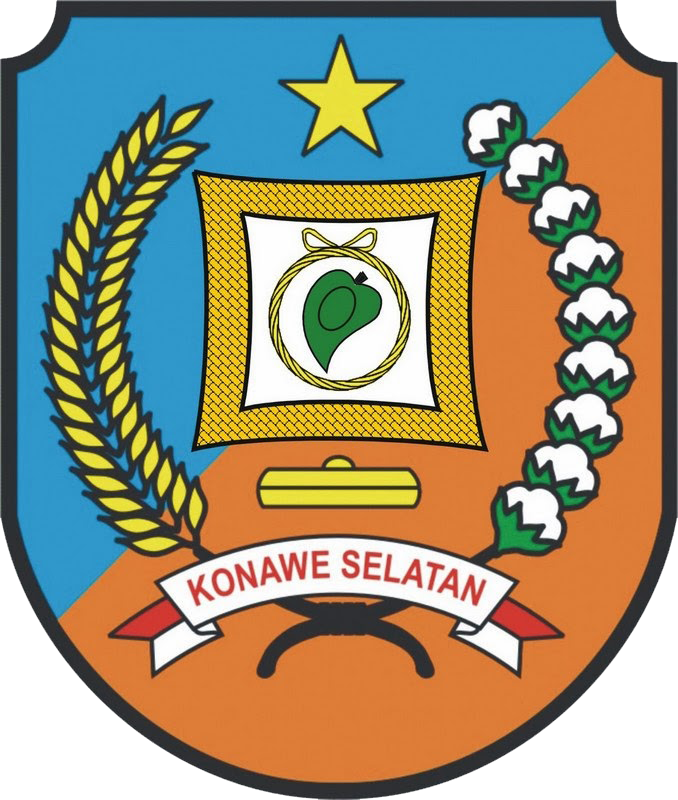
- Coat of arms

- Location within Southeast Sulawesi

- Location in Sulawesi and Indonesia South Konawe Regency (Indonesia)
- Coordinates: 3.4114°S 122.0200°E
- Country: Indonesia
- Province: Southeast Sulawesi
- Capital: Andoolo

Government
  - Regent: Irham Kalenggo
  - Vice Regent: Wahyu Ade Pratama Imran

Area
  - Total: 4,289.07 km^{2} (1,656.02 sq mi)

Population (mid 2025 estimate)
  - Total: 334,620
  - Density: 78.017/km^{2} (202.06/sq mi)
- Time zone: UTC+8 (ICST)
- Area code: (+62) 401
- Website: konaweselatankab.go.id

South Konawe Regency (Kabupaten Konawe Selatan) is a regency of Southeast Sulawesi Province, Indonesia. The regency was created on 25 February 2003 from what had been the southern districts of Konawe Regency. It covers an area of 4,289.07 km^{2} and had a population of 264,587 at the 2010 Census and of 308,524 at the 2020 Census; the official estimate as of mid 2025 was 334,620 (comprising 171,030 males and 163,590 females). The administrative centre is in the town of Andoolo.

== Administrative districts ==
At the time of the 2010 Census, the South Konawe Regency was divided into twenty-two districts (kecamatan), but subsequently three additional districts were created in 2014 by the division of existing districts - Andoolo Barat, Kolono Timur and Sabulakoa. The current 25 districts are tabulated below with their areas and their populations at the 2010 Census and 2020 Census, together with the official estimates for mid 2024. The table also includes the locations of the district administrative centres, the number of administrative villages in each district (totaling 336 rural desa and 15 urban kelurahan), and its postal code.

Kode Wilayah	Name of District (kecamatan)	Area in km^{2}	Pop'n Census 2010	Pop'n Census 2020	Pop'n Estimate mid 2024	Admin centre	No. of villages	Post code
74.05.01	Tinanggea	335.32	21,320	24,971	26,720	Tinanggea	24 ^{(a)}	93886
74.05.12	Lalembu	216.93	15,603	16,057	16,643	Atari Indah	18 ^{(b)}	93885
74.05.03	Andoolo	98.51	16,316	10,563	11,421	Andoolo	10 ^{(c)}	93810 - 93819
74.05.17	Buke	151.27	13,236	14,558	15,469	Buke	16	93812 - 93819
74.05.25	Andoolo Barat (West Andoolo)	72.43	^{(d)}	8,751	9,242	Anese	10	93813 - 93819
74.05.04	Palangga	159.15	12,287	14,792	15,865	Palangga	15 ^{(e)}	93882
74.05.14	Palangga Selatan (South Palangga)	108.33	6,139	7,392	8,243	Lakara	10 ^{(f)}	93884
74.05.20	Baito	186.38	7,562	9,004	9,952	Baito	8	93883
74.05.06	Lainea	234.04	8,870	10,038	10,781	Lainea	12	93881
74.05.19	Laeya	275.52	19,005	21,458	23,172	Punggaluku	17 ^{(g)}	93880
74.05.09	Kolono ^{(h)}	297.76	13,602	11,397	12,350	Kolono	21 ^{(i)}	93895
74.05.23	Kolono Timur (East Kolono)	119.46	^{(j)}	5,360	5,971	Tumbi-tumbu Jaya	10	93894
74.05.11	Laonti ^{(k)}	375.13	9,444	10,309	11,981	Ulusawah	19	93892
74.05.10	Moramo ^{(l)}	256.69	12,976	15,634	16,535	Lapuko	20 ^{(m)}	93891
74.05.16	Moramo Utara ^{(n)} (North Moramo)	165.24	7,174	8,867	10,323	Lalowaru	10 ^{(p)}	93890
74.05.07	Konda	121.87	18,131	21,724	23,542	Konda	18 ^{(q)}	93874
74.05.18	Wolasi	157.59	4,730	5,656	6,050	Aoma	6	93878
74.05.08	Ranomeeto	95.75	16,223	21,049	21,756	Ranomeeto	12 ^{(r)}	93870
74.05.22	Ranomeeto Barat (West Ranomeeto)	62.55	6,517	7,986	8,823	Lameuru	9	93871
74.05.05	Landono	125.43	11,470	8,392	9,725	Landono	13 ^{(s)}	93873
74.05.15	Mowila	128.36	11,188	13,700	14,444	Mowila	20	93879
74.05.24	Sabulakoa	53.84	^{(t)}	5,436	5,549	Sabulakoa	8	93872
74.05.02	Angata	283.60	14,905	16,811	18,568	Motaha	24	93875
74.05.13	Benua	124.64	9,734	10,897	11,340	Horodopi	12	93877
784.05.21	Basala	83.28	8,155	7,722	7,924	Basala	9	93876
	Totals	4,289.07	264,587	308,524	332,389	Andoolo	351	

Notes: (a) includes the 2 kelurahan of Tinanggea and Ngapaah. (b) includes the kelurahan of Atari Indah. (c) including the 2 kelurahan of Alangga and Potoro.
(d) the 2010 population of Andoolo Barat District is included in the figure for Andoolo District, from which it was cut out in 2014.
(e) includes the kelurahan of Palangga. (f) includes the kelurahan of Amondo. (g) includes the two kelurahan of Ambalodangge and Puunggaluku.
(h) includes the offshore island of Pulau Tawatawaro. (i) includes the kelurahan of Kolono.
(j) the 2010 population of Kolono Timur District is included in the figure for Kolono District, from which it was cut out in 2014.
(k) includes 20 offshore islands. (l) includes 3 offshore islands. (m) includes the kelurahan of Lapuko. (n) includes the offshore islands of Pulau Lara and Pulau Moramo.
(p) includes the kelurahan of Lalowaru. (q) includes the kelurahan of Konda. (r) includes the kelurahan of Ranomeeto. (s) includes the kelurahan of Landono.
(t) the 2010 population of Sabulakoa District is included in the figure for Landono District, from which it was cut out in 2014.

== Climate ==
South Konawe has a tropical rainforest climate (Af) with moderate rainfall from August to November and heavy rainfall from December to July. The following climate data is for the town of Andoolo, the seat of the regency.

Climate data for Andoolo
Month	Jan	Feb	Mar	Apr	May	Jun	Jul	Aug	Sep	Oct	Nov	Dec	Year
Mean daily maximum °C (°F)	30.9 (87.6)	30.8 (87.4)	30.8 (87.4)	30.7 (87.3)	30.1 (86.2)	29.3 (84.7)	29.0 (84.2)	29.7 (85.5)	30.7 (87.3)	31.9 (89.4)	32.0 (89.6)	31.2 (88.2)	30.6 (87.1)
Daily mean °C (°F)	26.9 (80.4)	26.9 (80.4)	26.8 (80.2)	26.9 (80.4)	26.6 (79.9)	25.9 (78.6)	25.4 (77.7)	25.6 (78.1)	26.2 (79.2)	27.1 (80.8)	27.6 (81.7)	27.1 (80.8)	26.6 (79.9)
Mean daily minimum °C (°F)	23.0 (73.4)	23.0 (73.4)	22.9 (73.2)	23.1 (73.6)	23.1 (73.6)	22.5 (72.5)	21.8 (71.2)	21.6 (70.9)	21.8 (71.2)	22.3 (72.1)	23.2 (73.8)	23.1 (73.6)	22.6 (72.7)
Average rainfall mm (inches)	199 (7.8)	198 (7.8)	220 (8.7)	199 (7.8)	240 (9.4)	220 (8.7)	152 (6.0)	103 (4.1)	94 (3.7)	70 (2.8)	119 (4.7)	173 (6.8)	1,987 (78.3)
Source: Climate-Data.org
