= Ichirgu-boila =

Commander in the First Bulgarian Empire

The Ichirgu-boila or Chargobilya (Greek: ητζιργου βοιλα; Old Bulgarian: чрьгѹбꙑлꙗ, Bulgarian: Ичиргу боила) was a high-ranking official in the First Bulgarian Empire. The holder of the post was the commander of the garrison of the capital and was the third most important person in the state after the ruler and the Kavkhan. In peace-time the ichirgu-boila had diplomatic functions. According to some data the ichirgu-boila personally commanded a squad of 400 heavy cavalrymen.

== Origin ==
According to Veselin Besheliev the word "ichirgu" was of Turkic-Altay origin and meant "internal".

One funeral inscription found during excavation works in Preslav talks about the ichirgu-boila Mostich who served under the Emperors Simeon I the Great (893-927) and Peter I (927-969). An unknown ichirgu-boila is mentioned in the Philippi Inscription dating from the reign of Khan Presian I.
