= Kondia =

Mansi principality

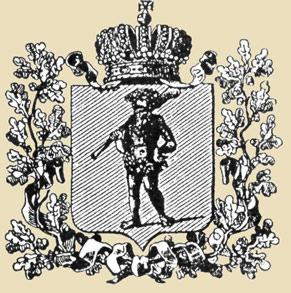
The coat of arms of Kondia

Kondia or Konda Principality (Russian: Кондинское княжество) was the name of a Mansi principality until the late 16th century.

The center of Konda was the settlement of Kartauzh (Russian: Картауж). The Konda Principality became part of the Pelym Principality as a fiefdom. Pelym resisted the conquests by the Moscow Principality for a long time and finally lost its independence only in the winter of 1593/94.

The Russian monarch himself possessed the title of "Sovereign and Grand Prince of Kondia", as included in the full official title.

The documentary information about Kondia is scarce.

== See also ==
- Konda (disambiguation)
- Kondinsky District
