= List of oldest church buildings =

This article lists some but by no means all of the oldest known church buildings in the world. In most instances, buildings listed here were reconstructed numerous times and only fragments of the original buildings have survived. These surviving freestanding buildings were purposely constructed for use by congregations (or used at an early date). The dates are the approximate dates when they were built and/or reconstructed and/or first used by Christian congregations for worship.

The term church may be used in the sense of "Christian denomination" or in the singular as the Christian Church as a whole. The "church" (Greek ekklēsía, 'assembly') is traced to Pentecost and the beginning of the Christian mission in the first century and was not used in reference to a building.

According to the historical Catholic Encyclopedia (published from 1907), the Cenacle, the site of the Last Supper in Jerusalem, was the "first Christian church". The Dura-Europos church in Syria is the oldest surviving church building in the world, while the archaeological remains of both the Aqaba Church and the Megiddo church have been considered to be the world's oldest known purpose-built church, erected in the Roman Empire's administrative Diocese of the East in the 3rd century. Several authors have cited the Etchmiadzin Cathedral (Armenia's mother church) as the oldest cathedral.

St. Thaddeus Monastery or Qara Kelisa (meaning 'black church') in Chaldoran County, Iran is also noted by UNESCO World Heritage Centre as relating to 66 AD: "According to Armenian tradition such a location was chosen because saint Thaddeus built the earliest church—parts of which are still believed to be in place as the base of the old section—upon the ruins of the temple." In 66 AD, he as one of the Apostles and Princess Sandukht (the daughter of the King or daughter of Abbot Simeon) and other Thaddeus' devotees were tortured and executed by Armenia's King Sanatrouk or Sanadruk.

== Early Christianity to late antiquity ==
Church buildings of the 1st to 4th centuries (AD 30‍–‍400), either excavated archaeologically or substantially preserved.

=== Africa ===
Building	Image	Location	Country	Oldest part	Denomination	Notes
Monastery of Saint Anthony		Eastern Desert	Egypt	356	Coptic Orthodox	Partially destroyed in the 11th century and rebuilt; very little of the original structure remains.
Monastery of Paromeos		Wadi El Natrun	Egypt	335	Coptic Orthodox	Built by St. Macarius the Great, its name (Pa-Romeos) which in Coptic means "The Romans" is thought to refer to his two Roman disciples Saints Maximus and Domitius sons of the Roman Emperor Valentinian II. The Monastery flourished during the Middle Ages and continues to be a major monastery within Egypt.
Monastery of Saint Macarius the Great		Wadi El Natrun	Egypt	360	Coptic Orthodox	Built by St. Macarius the Great, a father for more than 4,000 monks of different nationalities. Continually inhabited since its construction, the monastery was renovated and expanded in the 20th century.
Debre Sina		Anseba	Eritrea	<383	Eritrean Orthodox	The site of the first Holy Communion prepared in the Eritrean Orthodox Church, by the 4th-century bishop Aba Salama.
Monastery of Saint Pishoy		Wadi El Natrun	Egypt	4th century	Coptic Orthodox	Built by St Pishoy, his body was moved to the monastery on December 13, 841. The monastery contains five churches and a fifth-century keep constructed for protection against Berber raids. The Monastery was raided several times by Berbers, most famously when forty monastic elders were martyred and thrown into a neighboring well, now called "The Well of Martyrs".
Monastery of Saint Mary Deipara		Wadi El Natrun	Egypt	4th century	Coptic Orthodox	Most commonly known as "Syrian Monastery". Some sources claim that Monks had lived there since the 4th century, but it is most commonly believed that it was established in the 6th century by monks from the Monastery of St. Pishoy who rejected the Julian Heresy, which claimed that Christ was incorruptible. As a result, they abandoned the Monastery and established a new one which they named after the Theotokos, to emphasize that they believed in Christ's humanity and corruptibility. The Monastery was bought by Syrian Merchants in the eighth century and inhabited by Syrian Monks.
Abu Mena Basilica and Complex		Alexandria	Egypt	late 3rd century	Coptic Orthodox	Built near the place at which the Body of St. Mina the Martyr was buried, the Basilica was ordered to be built by Emperor Zenon after the Saint healed his leper daughter. A Monastic community and a city eventually sprang up near the Basilica and it became a famous site of pilgrimage. Terracotta pots with the image of the Saint and spices from his body have been found all throughout the Roman Empire and as far north as Germany. The City complex and Basilica as well as the Monastery were sacked and destroyed in the 7th century by the Arab invaders. The ruins are currently a UNESCO World Heritage site.
Monastery of Saint John the Short		Wadi El Natrun	Egypt	4th century	Coptic Orthodox	Built by Saint John around his "Tree of Obedience". The Monastery remained open until the 17th century when it was finally abandoned. Originally the body of St. John was in a Church near modern-day Suez, Egypt, but his disciples moved it to the monastery in 515 AD.
Monastery of Saint Moses the Strong		Wadi El Natrun	Egypt	4th century	Coptic Orthodox	Built by Saint Moses the Strong, who is called the Apostle of Peace. St. Moses was an Outlaw who repented and became a Monk in Sketes. As he progressed in age he became a father unto many, some of whom were criminals following his example. He was ordained a Priest and built a Chapel and a small monastic community around it. In 405 AD St. Moses heard news that the Monastery was going to be sacked, his disciples wanted to pick up arms and defend their home, however he urged them to either stand as Martyrs with him or escape to neighboring monastic communities. He and 7 others remained in the Church as it was sacked. Later some of his disciples returned and took his body, and the 7 others, with them to Paramous, where they lay today. The Monastery has remained desolate to this day.
Church of Our Lady Mary of Zion		Axum	Ethiopia	4th century	Ethiopian Orthodox	Originally built in the 4th century, it has been rebuilt several times, most recently in the 17th century during the reign of Emperor Fasilides.
Beta Samati		Beta Samati, near Edaga Rebua, Mezbir	Kingdom of Aksum, Ethiopia	4th century	Ethiopian Orthodox	Originally built in the 4th century, the church may be the oldest known from sub-Saharan Africa.

=== Asia ===
Building	Image	Location	Country	Oldest part	Denomination	Notes
Monastery of Saint Thaddeus		Chaldoran County	Iran	In Armenian sources, it is said that this church was built in 66 AD. Another source mentions the construction of this building in 239 AD by Saint Gregory the Illuminator	Early Church	No archaeological evidence confirms the 3rd century date. During the repetitive wars in Iranian history, the building has been repaired and restored multiple times.
Dura-Europos church		Dura-Europos	Syria	c. 241	Early Church	House church. Several walls still standing, oldest images of Jesus discovered within the surviving frescoes of the large baptistry room. Fragments of parchment scrolls with Hebrew texts unearthed containing Christian Eucharistic prayers closely connected with the prayers in the Didache.
Megiddo church		Legio near Tel Megiddo	Israel	c. 230	Early Church	Ruins discovered on prison grounds in 2005, possibly oldest building constructed as a church ever discovered. It retains mosaic floor decoration with Christian motifs – possibly the oldest building with this feature.
Aqaba Church		Aqaba	Jordan	late 3rd-early 4th century	Early Church	Ruins uncovered in 1998; Remains of an early basilica. Considered to be the world's first known purpose-built church.
Artaxata church		Artaxata	Armenia	4th century	Early church	In 2024, a team of archaeologists from Armenia and Germany discovered in Artaxata the remains of Armenia's oldest known church.
Etchmiadzin Cathedral		Vagharshapat	Armenia	301 (tradition); current church: 483–484	Armenian Apostolic Church	According to scholars it was the first cathedral of the world (but not the first church) built in ancient Armenia, a UNESCO World Heritage Site.
Mar Sarkis Monastery		Ma'loula	Syria	4th century	Syriac Catholic	Built in the 4th century on the remains of a pagan temple, it likely predates the Council of Nicea (325 AD) as evidenced by the fact that it has a round altar, which was prohibited at the Council. The monastery suffered extensive damage and desecration in the Syrian Civil War.
Hagia Sophia, İznik		İznik	Turkey	325; current structure from 1065	Early Christian church, now Orhan Mosque	It was built in Nicaea as a Byzantine-era basilican church.
Cathedral of Saints Constantine and Helen		Yabroud	Syria	326	Greek Melkite Catholic	Originally built as a pagan temple dedicated to Baalshamin during the first millennium BC, it was converted to a church when Saint Helen passed through the city on her way back to Rome from Jerusalem. The church was damaged during the Syrian Civil War.
Church of the Holy Sepulchre		Jerusalem (East Jerusalem)	Palestine	335	Simultaneum	Originally completed in 335, the building suffered extensive damage and was almost completely destroyed in 1009. The church was rebuilt in 1048.
Church of the Nativity		Bethlehem	Palestine	339	Simultaneum	It was commissioned in 327 by Constantine and his mother Helena over the site that was traditionally considered to be located over the cave that marks the birthplace of Jesus. The original basilica was completed in 339.
Mar Mattai Monastery		Mount Alfaf	Iraq	363	Syriac Orthodox	Extensively rebuilt over the years with the earliest portions built during the 4th century.
Yererouk Basilica		Yererouk	Armenia	4th or 5th century	Armenian Apostolic	Original building retains many ancient features.
Kasagh Basilica		Aparan	Armenia	4th or 5th century	Armenian Apostolic	Original building retains many ancient features.
Mor Gabriel Monastery		Midyat	Turkey	397	Syriac Orthodox	Built on the ruins of an old Assyrian temple, the property is now currently subject to a dispute between the Turkish government and the church.
Jubail Church		Al-Jubail	Saudi Arabia	4th century	Church of the East	Rediscovered in 1986 and excavated by the Saudi government, which prohibits access in line with its policy of Muslim exclusivity.
Church of Saint Peter		Antioch (Antakya)	Turkey	4th or 5th century	Syriac Orthodox Church	Cave church used by very first Christians of Antioch, where Saint Peter presided as bishop. Known by its original Aramaic name of Knisset Mar Semaan Kefa. Extensively reconstructed, with oldest surviving elements from 4th or 5th century.

=== Europe ===
Building	Image	Location	Country	Oldest structure part	Current main structure	Year consecrated	Denomination	Notes
Temple of Augustus and Livia		Vienne	France	First stage during the last quarter of the 1st century BC, reconstruction 1st Century before year 42	Before year 42	Beginning of the 6th century	Roman Catholic	Built in the 1st Century as a temple in honor of Augustus and Livia, it became a Christian Church probably at the beginning of the 6th Century. After 1200 years as Sainte-Marie-la-Vieille, it was converted into a Temple of Reason in 1792 by the French Revolution, then a Court in 1795, and finally a Museum from 1822 to 1852. From 1852 to 1880, it was restored to its first appearance.
Pantheon, Rome		Rome	Italy	125	125	609	Roman Catholic	Former Roman temple and, since 609 AD, a Catholic church (Basilica di Santa Maria ad Martyres or Basilica of St. Mary and the Martyrs)
Catacomb of Callixtus		Rome	Italy	c.218 - c.222	c.218 - c.222	c.218 - c.222	Early Christian	Built by Pope Callixtus I, also called Callistus I, the bishop of Rome (according to Sextus Julius Africanus)
Cathedral of Saint Domnius		Split	Croatia	295–305	295-305	641	Roman Catholic	Built 295–305 as the Mausoleum of emperor Diocletian, is the second oldest structure used by any Christian Cathedral. It is regarded as the oldest Catholic cathedral in the world that remains in use in its original structure, without near-complete renovation at a later date.
Rotunda of Saint George		Thessaloniki	Greece	306	306	4th century	Greek Orthodox	Built as an imperial mausoleum or temple, currently a museum, with church access for various festivities.
Santi Cosma e Damiano		Rome	Italy	c. 309	c. 309		Roman Catholic	Occupies the former space of the Temple of Romulus in the Roman Forum.
Archbasilica of Saint John Lateran (few remains of the original structure)		Rome	Italy	c. 313-324	c. 313-324	c. 313-324	Roman Catholic	Oldest Christian basilica. Was founded after a donation of Constantine the Great to Pope Miltiades, right after the Edict of Milan.
Panagia Ekatontapiliani		Parikia	Greece	326			Greek Orthodox	Panagia Ekatontapyliani (also known as the Church of 100 Doors) is a historic Byzantine church complex.
Stavrovouni Monastery		Larnaca	Cyprus	327–329			Greek Orthodox	It was founded by Saint Helena the mother of the Byzantine Emperor Constantine the Great at the place where after a miracle she found the lost Holy Cross on her way back from her pilgrimage to the Holy Land. Saint Helena went on the pilgrimage after the First Ecumenical Synod in Nicaea (325). The monastery has a piece of the Holy Cross left there by Saint Helena.
St. Peter's Basilica (few remains of the original structure)		Vatican City	Vatican City State	333	1635	333	Roman Catholic	Largest church in the world and the seat of Roman Catholicism, the current church (1635) is built on the site of the original basilica and the grave of St. Peter (who was martyred in Rome). The actual grave is visible in excavations under the church. The original floor and columns are visible in a space under the 17th-century floor.
Rotonda of Saint George church		Sofia	Bulgaria	4th century during the reign of Constantine the Great (306–337)	306–337	4th century as baptistery	Bulgarian Orthodox	Built by the Romans with many later additions, Saint George is the oldest building in Sofia and Bulgaria and it is dating from the Roman era. Still a functioning church.
Santa Maria in Trastevere (wall structure and floors from the original structure)		Rome	Italy	340		340	Roman Catholic	The first sanctuary was built in 221 and 227 by Pope Callixtus I and later completed by Julius I, but the oldest parts of the present church, the wall structure and floors, date from 340 AD
Cathedral of Trier (few remains of the original structure)		Trier	Germany	340	11th - 12th centuries	340	Roman Catholic	Oldest cathedral in Germany, and still in use today. Its construction was overseen by Bishop Maximin of Trier, the construction of the grandest ensemble of ecclesiastical structures in the West outside Rome. A few 4th-century elements remain in a mainly Romanesque building.
Hagia Sophia (later additions)		Istanbul	Turkey	360; current structure build 532-537;	537	537-1453	Greek Orthodox	For almost 1,000 years it was the largest church in Christendom, the main center of worship for the Eastern Orthodox Church, and the jewel of Constantinople. In 1453, it was captured and converted into a mosque, becoming a museum in 1932 under Atatürk. In July 2020, it was turned into a mosque again.
Great Basilica, Plovdiv (ruins and mosaics)		Plovdiv	Bulgaria	mid-4th century	mid-4th century	mid-4th century	Early Christian Bishop's Basilica	Ancient church from the ancient city of Philippopolis It is the largest late antique early-Christian church discovered in Bulgaria and one of the largest from that period on the Balkans. The most interesting findings at the basilica are the mosaics that covered the floor. They spread across an area of nearly 22,000 ft^{2} (2,000 m^{2}) revealing extremely interesting motifs.
Basilica di San Simpliciano (few remains of the original structure)		Milan	Italy	c. 374-400	12th - 13th centuries	c.374-400	Roman Catholic	Exterior walls are original from the late 4th century. Roman basilica windows as in Cathedral of Trier are still visible on the flanks of the basilica.
Basilica of Sant'Ambrogio		Milan	Italy	379	379	379	Roman Catholic	One of the most ancient churches in Milan, it was commissioned by St. Ambrose in 379–386, in an area where numerous martyrs of the Roman persecutions had been buried. The first name of the church was in fact Basilica Martyrum.
Basilica of Saint-Pierre-aux-Nonnains		Metz	France	380	380	7th century	Roman Catholic	Originally built to be part of a Roman spa complex, the structure was converted into use as a church in the 7th century when it became the chapel of a Benedictine monastery.
San Nazaro in Brolo		Milan	Italy	c. 382			Roman Catholic	One of the earliest Latin cross buildings in western Europe; retains few ancient features.
San Paolo fuori le mura (complete reconstruction)		Rome	Italy	386			Roman Catholic	One of the four major Constantinian basilicas in Rome, and the only one to retain its antique character, the basilica was heavily damaged by an 1823 fire. It was rebuilt true to form, however, so it remains one of the best "preserved" Constantinian basilicas in the Roman world. All that remain of the ancient basilica are the interior portions of the apse and the triumphal arch.
Santi Giovanni e Paolo		Rome	Italy	398			Roman Catholic	A 4th-century basilica was erected on the site of one of the most well-preserved "house churches" of early Christianity (dating from the 1st, 2nd or 3rd century), with intact fresco decoration. The houses are part of a museum currently, but the basilica still functions as a church.
Lullingstone Roman Villa		Eynsford, Kent, England	United Kingdom	4th century			Early Christian	Room in a large Roman villa turned into a Christian chapel or house church, with wall-paintings surviving (Chi-Rho, largely restored, illustrated)
Basilica di Sant'Eustorgio ruins		Milan	Italy	c. 4th century			Roman Catholic	Some ruins remain of the apse of the ancient basilica.
Aula Palatina (Konstantinbasilika)		Trier	Germany	4th century			Evangelical Church in the Rhineland	A Roman palace basilica that was built by the Emperor Constantine at the beginning of the 4th century. The basilica contains the largest extant hall from antiquity. The church was converted to Protestant use from its original Roman Catholic use in 1856.
Santi Nereo e Achilleo		Rome	Italy	4th century (before 336)	15th century	before 336	Roman Catholic	Adjoins the Baths of Caracalla at the site where St. Peter is said to have dropped the cloth covering his wounds upon his removal from the Mamertine Prison. First referenced in 336, a 15th-century basilica sits on its original site; only the columns are original.
Santa Pudenziana		Rome	Italy	4th century	1588	4th century	Roman Catholic	Retains original and unique late Roman mosaic decoration.
San Clemente al Laterano		Rome	Italy	4th century	before 1100	4th century	Roman Catholic	The present basilica was built just before the year 1100, but beneath it is an intact 4th-century basilica that had been converted out of the home of a Roman nobleman, part of which had in the 1st century briefly served as an early church. This ancient basilica retains fresco decoration (see image). The basement the house had in the 2nd century briefly served as a mithraeum. The home of the Roman nobleman had been built on the foundations of a republican era building that had been destroyed in the Great Fire of Rome in 64 AD.
Santa Costanza		Rome	Italy	4th century			Roman Catholic	Built under Constantine as a mausoleum for his daughter, Costanza. Retains many original mosaic decorations, and her porphyry sarcophagus is a gem of the Vatican Museum.
Santi Quattro Coronati		Rome	Italy	4th century			Roman Catholic	Sanctuary is located in an isolated green area of Rome, so it retains the ambience of the area in antiquity.
Chora Church (few remains of the original structure)		Istanbul	Turkey	early 4th century	1077–1081	early 4th century	Eastern Orthodox	Very little remains of the 4th-century structure, the majority of the fabric of the current building dates from 1077–1081 and it contains impressive 13th-century mosaic decoration. It was converted to a mosque in 1501 and has been a museum since the time of Atatürk.
Hagia Irene		Istanbul	Turkey	First structure from the 4th century; restoration from 549	549 and 741-775	4th century	Eastern Orthodox	Now a museum and concert hall (due to its excellent acoustics). Its excellent state of preservation is due to the fact that it lies inside the Ottoman palace complex (Topkapı Palace).
Saint Sofia Church		Sofia	Bulgaria	4th century (few remains of the original structure), actual building is from 6th century during the reign of Justinian I (527–565)	527-565	4th century	Early Christian; now Bulgarian Orthodox;	The church was built near the Amphitheatre of Serdica. In 343 in the building took place the Council of Serdica that was attended by 316 bishops. The current building is from the 6th century.
Basilica of St. George in Sostra (in ruins)		Sostra ancient Roman fort and settlement of Sostra.	Bulgaria	4th century	4th century	4th century	Early Christian	The city and the church were completely destroyed by the Huns at the end of the 5th century.
Hagios Demetrios		Thessaloniki	Greece	4th century	after 629-634	4th century	Greek Orthodox	Main sanctuary dedicated to Saint Demetrius, the patron saint of Thessaloniki (in Central Macedonia, Greece), dating from a time when it was the second largest city of the Byzantine Empire. Since 1988, it has been on the UNESCO World Heritage List as a part of the site Paleochristian and Byzantine monuments of Thessaloniki.
Hagia Sophia, Thessaloniki		Thessaloniki	Greece	4th century	7th century (after 620)	4th century	Greek Orthodox	With its current structure dating from the 7th century, it is one of the oldest churches in the city still standing today. Because of its outstanding Byzantine art and architecture, in addition to its importance in early Christianity, it is one of several monuments in Thessaloniki listed as a UNESCO World Heritage Site in 1988.
Basilica di San Lorenzo (rebuilt several times over the centuries)		Milan	Italy	364-402			Roman Catholic	When built, it was the biggest circular church building standing. It was an inspiration for the current structure of Hagia Sophia in Constantinople. Few ancient features remain.

== Late antiquity to early Middle Ages ==
Church buildings dating to between the 5th and 10th centuries (AD 400‍–‍900).

=== Africa ===
Building	Image	Location	Country	Oldest Part	Denomination	Notes
Saint Catherine's Monastery		Sinai Peninsula	Egypt	AD 548	Greek Orthodox	Built by Emperor Justinian surrounding St. Helen's Chapel of the Burning Bush. One of the Monasteries was converted into a Mosque by the Fatimid Caliphs in the 10th century and remained in popular use till the 13th century. The Mosque was restored in the 20th century and continues to be used in special occasions.
Monastery of Saint Paul the Anchorite		Eastern Desert	Egypt	AD 560	Coptic Orthodox	Partially destroyed in the 15th century and rebuilt; was abandoned in the 16th century, but was later repopulated by Monks from St. Antony's monastery early in the 17th century.
Church of Saint Menas		Cairo	Egypt	6th century AD	Coptic Orthodox	Built in honor of the Saint and Martyr, the Church was built within what later was renamed "Cairo". The Church was renovated in the 8th century, and the body of Saint Mena which had been in the ruins of the Abu Mena Complex in Mariout was moved there. The body remained there until a modern Monastery bearing the Saint's name was built adjacent to the ruins, in 1967 the body was moved to the new Monastery. The Church remains open to this day and is a prominent pilgrimage and tourist center in Cairo.
Debre Damo		Tigray Region	Ethiopia	6th century	Ethiopian Orthodox	The best preserved example of Aksumite Architecture.
Church of the Virgin Mary in Haret Zuweila		Cairo	Egypt	10th Century AD	Coptic Orthodox	Served as the See of St. Mark, and the Seat of the Coptic Orthodox Pope of Alexandria from 1400 to 1520. Later a Nun's Convent was added to it in the 19th Century.

=== Asia ===
Building	Image	Location	Country	Oldest Part	Denomination	Notes
Monastery of Stoudios		Istanbul	Turkey	462	Greek Orthodox	No longer a functioning church, and was a mosque until it fell into ruin. As with many other archaeological sites in Turkey, plans to revert the ruins back into a mosque are underway.
Qalb Loze		Qalb Loze	Syria	5th century	Assyrian Church	Built in 460s, one of the best-preserved early Syrian churches, the first known with a wide basilica, where the columns that separate the aisles from the nave have been replaced with low piers and soaring arches that create the feeling of expanded space.
Church of Saint Simeon Stylites (Deir Semaan, in ruins)		Aleppo	Syria	475	Greek Orthodox	Once a popular pilgrimage site, now in ruins, but walls still standing.
Turmanin Basilica (in ruins)		Turmanin	Syria	480	Early Church	Drawing reconstruction shown. Now in ruins, served a monastery and hospice.
Mor Hananyo Monastery		Mardin	Turkey	493	Syriac Orthodox	Founded in 493 by Mor Shlemon on the site of a temple dedicated to the Assyrian sun god Shamash that was converted into a citadel by the Romans, then transformed into a monastery. Better known as Saffron Monastery. (Deir-ul-Zafran)
Church of the Nativity		Bethlehem	Palestine	c. 565	Simultaneum	One of the oldest church buildings in the world which has continuously functioned as a church.
Saint Hripsime Church		Vagarshapat	Armenia	618	Armenian Apostolic	The current building was erected during the reign of Catholicos Komitas (615–628), according to an account of contemporary chronicler Sebeos and two inscriptions, one on the west facade and the other on the east apse. It replaced the earlier mausoleum of Hripsime.
Saint Gayane Church		Vagarshapat	Armenia	630	Armenian Apostolic	St. Gayane was built by Catholicos Ezra I in the year 630. Its design has remained unchanged despite partial renovations of the dome and some ceilings in 1652.
Zvartnots Cathedral		Vagarshapat	Armenia	643-652	Armenian Apostolic	Zvartnots was noted for its circular exterior structure, unique in medieval Armenian architecture, and a set of interior piers that upheld a multifloor structure crowned with a dome.

=== Europe ===
Building	Image	Location	Country	Oldest Part	Denomination	Notes
San Vitale		Rome	Italy	400	Roman Catholic	Although it was restored several times, the church retains its original structure and walls; it actually sits below street level due to its age and relative lack of major structural renovations. The portico is one of the most ancient parts of the church.
Santa Sabina		Rome	Italy	422	Roman Catholic	Mostly unaltered, with some original mosaic decoration and agate window treatments. Notably, wooden doors date from around the same era and contain an early depiction of the crucifixion.
San Giovanni Evangelista		Ravenna	Italy	424	Roman Catholic	Partially original walls, with original floors and columns under layers of new floors.
Santa Maria Maggiore		Rome	Italy	432	Roman Catholic	Features intact original mosaic decoration, including some of the oldest depictions of the Virgin Mary. 18th-century façade covers 12th-century façade which replaced the original.
Valkum (Fenekpuszta) basilica		near lake Balaton	Hungary	before 433	Early Christian church	Features intact original mosaic decoration, including some of the oldest depictions of the Virgin Mary. 18th-century façade covers 12th-century façade which replaced the original.
Church of the Acheiropoietos		Thessaloniki	Greece	450–470	Greek Orthodox	The Acheiropoietos has been dated from its bricks and mosaics to c. 450–470, making it perhaps the earliest of the city's surviving churches. It was modified in the 7th century and again in the 14th and 15th centuries, but retains much of its original character. Known as the Panagia Theotokos in Byzantine times, it is dedicated to Mary.
Santo Stefano Rotondo		Rome	Italy	455	Roman Catholic	Believed to be the first church in Rome with a circular plan, inspired by the Church of the Holy Sepulchre in Jerusalem.
Sant'Agata dei Goti		Rome	Italy	460	Roman Catholic	Built for the Arian Goths by Ricimer, this ancient church retains its original site plan and columns, despite many restorations.
Stenče Basilica		Polog Valley	North Macedonia	420–465	Early Church	To date remains of 16 early Christian basilicas have been revealed in the Polog Valley, of which 12 in Tetovo area and 4 in Gostivar area, and best has been investigated the one in Stenče dating from the 5th century AD, which is unique in Macedonia with 3 baptisteries.
Bolnisi Sioni		Bolnisi	Georgia	479–493	Georgian Orthodox	Oldest extant church building in Georgia
Basilica of Sant'Apollinare Nuovo		Ravenna	Italy	504	Originally Arianism, later Roman Catholic	It was erected by the Ostrogothic king Theodoric the Great as his palace chapel.
Santa Prisca		Rome	Italy	4th or 5th century	Roman Catholic	In the interior, the columns are the only visible remains of the ancient church after a 17th-century restoration, but the floor plan remains. A baptismal font allegedly used by Saint Peter is also conserved.
Red Church (in ruins)		Perushtitsa	Bulgaria	491–518	Early Christian Bishop's Basilica	Large partially preserved late Roman (early Byzantine) Christian basilica in south central Bulgaria.
Hagia Sophia Church, Nesebar (in ruins)		Nesebar	Bulgaria	late 5th - early 6th century	Early Christian church	Situated in the old quarter of the town which is part of the UNESCO World Heritage Site list and of the 100 Tourist Sites of Bulgaria. The church has a total length of 25.5 m and a width of 13 m. Its present appearance was dated from the beginning of the 9th century when it was reconstructed. During the Middle Ages it served as a cathedral for the bishopric eparchy centered in Nesebar. In 1257 the church was looted by the Venetians during a campaign against the Bulgarian Empire and many religious relics were taken in the Church of San Salvatore in Venice. The basilica was abandoned in the 18th century.
Elenska Basilica (in ruins)		Pirdop	Bulgaria	5th–6th century	Early Christian Bishop's Basilica	Large partially preserved late Roman (early Byzantine) Christian basilica in west central Bulgaria. The initially domeless basilica, which features thick walls and defensive towers, had a dome added in the mid-6th century, during the reign of Justinian I.
Little Hagia Sophia		Istanbul	Turkey	532-536	Greek Orthodox	A former Eastern Orthodox church dedicated to Saints Sergius and Bacchus in Constantinople, converted into a mosque during the Ottoman Empire. This Byzantine building with a central dome plan was erected in the 6th century by Justinian, likely was a model for Hagia Sophia, and is one of the most important early Byzantine buildings in Istanbul. Poorly executed restorations leave the church with a modern character.
Basilica di San Vitale		Ravenna	Italy	547	Roman Catholic	The best-preserved basilica from the time of Justinian I, filled with outstanding Byzantine mosaics in an excellent state of preservation.
Basilica of Sant'Apollinare in Classe		Ravenna	Italy	549	Originally - Ecumenical Patriarchate of Constantinople, later Roman Catholic	Consecrated on 9 May 549 by the bishop Maximian and dedicated to Saint Apollinaris, the first bishop of Ravenna and Classe. An important monument of Byzantine art, in 1996 it was inscribed with seven other nearby monuments in the UNESCO World Heritage List
Basilica of Saint Servatius		Maastricht	Netherlands	c. 550	Roman Catholic	The oldest church in the Netherlands. There was a small memorial chapel on the site dedicated to the Saint Servatius (310–384), who became the first bishop of Maastricht, and this was later replaced by a larger stone church, incorporating the ancient stone.
Dranda Cathedral		Dranda	Abkhazia / Georgia	c. 550–600	Abkhazian Orthodox	Still functioning as a church.
Dormition of the Theotokos Church, Labovë e Kryqit		Gjirokastër	Albania	6th century	Albanian Orthodox	The Dormition of the Theotokos Church (Albanian: Kisha e Shën Mërisë) is a church in Labovë e Kryqit, Gjirokastër County, Albania. The foundation on the structure dates from 6th, with the rest from 13th. It is a Cultural Monument of Albania. The present building dates from the 13th century.
Jvari (monastery)		Mtskheta	Georgia	590–604	Georgian Orthodox	A World Heritage Site.
St. Martin's Church		Canterbury, England	United Kingdom	c. 580	Church of England	The oldest church building in Great Britain still functioning as a church.
Church of Saint Apostles Peter and Paul		Stari Ras, Novi Pazar	Serbia	6th century	Serbian Orthodox	Also known as Peter's Church (Serbian: Петрова црква / Petrova crkva), it is a Serbian Orthodox church, the oldest intact church in Serbia. It is situated on a hill of Ras, the medieval capital of the Serbian Grand Principality (Rascia), near Novi Pazar, Serbia. It is part of the Stari Ras complex, listed on the UNESCO List of World Heritage Sites in Serbia. The foundations of the structure date from the 6th century, with the rest from the 7th, 9th, and 12th centuries.
Chapel of São Frutuoso		Real, Braga	Portugal	656	Catholic Church	Visigoth chapel. It has been modified and rebuilt many times.
San Juan Bautista		Baños de Cerrato, Venta de Baños, Castile and León	Spain	Completed in 661	Catholic Church	Visigoth church.
Santa María de Melque		San Martín de Montalbán, Castile-La Mancha	Spain	668	Catholic Church	Church in Toledo.
Chapel of St Peter-on-the-Wall		Bradwell-on-Sea, Essex, England	United Kingdom	660–662	Catholic, now Church of England	Early Anglo-Saxon church, reusing Roman brick. Still in use.
Escomb Church		Escomb, County Durham, England	United Kingdom	c. 670–675	Catholic, now Church of England	Early Anglo-Saxon church. Still in use.
All Saints' Church, Brixworth		Brixworth, Northamptonshire, England	United Kingdom	before 675	Catholic, now Church of England	Early Anglo-Saxon church, with later additions. Still in use.
San Pedro de la Nave		El Campillo, San Pedro de la Nave-Almendra, Castile and León	Spain	680	Catholic Church	Visigothic church built between 680 and 711.
Crypt of San Antolín of the Cathedral of Palencia		Palencia, Castile and León	Spain	7th century	Catholic Church	Remnant of the primitive Visigothic cathedral.
Hermitage of Santa María de Lara		Quintanilla de las Viñas, Mambrillas de Lara, Castile and León	Spain	Completed at late-7th century or early-8th century	Catholic Church	Visigothic hermitage.
Church of St John the Baptist, Kerch		Kerch	Ukraine	717	Ukrainian Orthodox	Founded in 717, later rebuilt on several occasions.
St. Patrick's Church, Duleek		Duleek, County Meath	Ireland	Before 724	Roman Catholic (pre-Reformation)	Mentioned in accounts of AD 724, although it may date to the 6th or 7th century. Believed to be the first stone church built in Ireland, although Gallarus Oratory may be older.
Santa Cruz de Cangas de Onís		Cangas de Onís, Asturias	Spain	Completed in 737	Roman Catholic	Church of Kingdom of Asturias. It was consecrated in 737. The church was restored in 1633 and 1936. A World Heritage Site.
Church of San Juan Apóstol y Evangelista		Santianes, Pravia, Asturias	Spain	774	Roman Catholic	Church of Kingdom of Asturias. Built between 774 and 783. A World Heritage Site.
Oviedo Cathedral		Oviedo, Asturias	Spain	781	Roman Catholic	Church of Kingdom of Asturias. It underwent modifications and was enlarged until 16th century. A World Heritage Site.
Santa María de Bendones		Bendones, Asturias	Spain	792	Roman Catholic	Church of Kingdom of Asturias. Built between 792 and 842. A World Heritage Site.
Aachen Cathedral		Aachen	Germany	805	Roman Catholic	It is the oldest cathedral in northern Europe and was constructed by order of the emperor Charlemagne, who was buried there after his death in 814. It is a World Heritage Site.
San Julián de los Prados		Oviedo, Asturias	Spain	Completed in 830	Roman Catholic	Church of Kingdom of Asturias. The church's construction was ordered by Alfonso II of Asturias and it was built by the court architect Tioda. A World Heritage Site.
Santa María del Naranco		Municipality of Oviedo, Asturias	Spain	Completed in 842	Roman Catholic	Church of Kingdom of Asturias. Built as a banqueting house, later used as a church. It is a World Heritage Site.
San Miguel de Lillo		Oviedo, Asturias	Spain	Completed in 842	Roman Catholic	Church of Kingdom of Asturias. It is a World Heritage Site.
Santa Cristina de Lena		Lena, Asturias	Spain	Completed in 852	Roman Catholic	Church of Kingdom of Asturias. It is a World Heritage Site.
Hildesheim Cathedral		Hildesheim	Germany	872	Roman Catholic	The original form of the cathedral is still clearly recognizable. It is a World Heritage Site.
Great Basilica, Pliska		Pliska	Bulgaria	Completed around 875 during the rule of Knyaz Boris I (852–889)	Bulgarian Orthodox	Architectural complex in Pliska, the first capital of the Bulgarian Empire, which includes a cathedral, an archbishop's palace and a monastery. Completed around 875, the basilica was the largest Christian cathedral in Europe around 1000 years, with an area of 2,920 square metres (31,400 sq ft). The basilica was built at the place of what is known as the Cross-shaped Mausoleum, an older religious building that is thought by some researchers to be an unknown kind of Bulgar heathen temple. According to the Shumen architectural museum's research, an early Christian martyrium that included a cross-shaped church and a holy spring also existed at that place. The martyr buried there is thought to be Enravota, the first Bulgarian saint.
Church of St. Sophia, Ohrid	Rear courtyard	Ohrid	North Macedonia	9th century during the rule of Knyaz Boris I (852–889)	originally Bulgarian Orthodox, now Macedonian Orthodox Church	The church was built during the First Bulgarian Empire, after the official conversion to Christianity. Some sources date the building of the church during the rule of Knyaz Boris I (852–889).
Round Church, Preslav		Preslav	Bulgaria	Before 907 during the rule of Tsar Simeon I	Bulgarian Orthodox	Large partially preserved early medieval Eastern Orthodox church in Preslav, the former capital of the First Bulgarian Empire, today a town in northeastern Bulgaria. The church dates to the early 10th century, the time of Tsar Simeon I's rule, and was unearthed and first archaeologically examined in 1927–1928. Considered to be one of the most impressive examples of medieval Bulgarian architecture, the Round Church takes its name from the distinctive shape of one of its three sections, the cella (naos), which is a rotunda that serves as a place of liturgy. The church's design also includes a wide atrium and a rectangular entrance area, or narthex, marked by two circular turrets.
Iglesia de San Tirso		Oviedo, Asturias	Spain	9th century	Roman Catholic	Church of Kingdom of Asturias. It was founded in the 9th century. It has undergone various reconstructions and restorations. Now it is a World Heritage Site.
San Pedro de Nora		Las Regueras, Asturias	Spain	9th century	Roman Catholic	Church of Kingdom of Asturias. It suffered a restoration after Spanish Civil War.
Cámara Santa		Oviedo, Asturias	Spain	9th century	Roman Catholic	Church of Kingdom of Asturias.. It is a World Heritage Site.
San Salvador de Valdediós		Municipality of Villaviciosa, Asturias	Spain	9th century	Roman Catholic	Church of Kingdom of Asturias. Consecrated in 893. It is a World Heritage Site.
Santiago de Gobiendes		Gobiendes, Asturias	Spain	late-9th century	Roman Catholic	Church of Kingdom of Asturias. It was restored in three times.
Santo Adriano de Tuñón		Tuñón, Asturias	Spain	9th century	Roman Catholic	Church of Kingdom of Asturias. Founded in 891.
Church of St. Margaret of Antioch		Kopčany	Slovakia	9th or 10th century	Roman Catholic	The only remaining Great Moravian building. The oldest church in Slovakia. Well-preserved and openly accessible to the public.
Church of San Salvador de Priesca		Villaviciosa, Asturias	Spain	Completed in 921	Roman Catholic	Church of Kingdom of Asturias. Consecrated in 921. It is a World Heritage Site.
San Pietro in Trento		Ravenna	Italy	c. 977	Roman Catholic	Facade restored, but very much intact. Constructed by Galla Placidia.
Hosios Loukas Church		near the town of Distomo, Boeotia	Greece	10th century	Eastern Orthodox Church	The oldest building in the complex is the only church known with certainty to have been built in the 10th century in its site in mainland Greece. This centralized parallelogram-shaped building is the oldest example of the cross-in-square type in the country; its plan closely follows that of Lips Monastery in Constantinople.
Boyana Church		Sofia	Bulgaria	late 10th or early 11th century	Bulgarian Orthodox Church	Medieval Bulgarian Orthodox church situated on the outskirts of Sofia, the capital of Bulgaria, in the Boyana quarter. In 1979, the building was added to the UNESCO World Heritage List. The east wing of the two-storey church was originally constructed in the late 10th or early 11th century, then the central wing was added in the 13th century under the Second Bulgarian Empire, the whole building being finished with a further expansion to the west in the middle of the 19th century. A total of 89 scenes with 240 human images are depicted on the walls of the church.

- The Dead Cities of Syria feature ruins of many churches, all abandoned prior to the 8th century and many dating from the 4th and 5th centuries
- St. George's Church, Rihab, Jordan, 1st to 8th centuries. Dates are contested by experts but area under the church may have been used for Christian worship as early as AD 33.
- Church of Sts. Constantine and Helen, Yabroud, Syria, 5th century, Built from Roman temple; Desecrated in 2014 by extremists in Syrian civil war.
- Al-Aqiser church, built in 500s, oldest church building in Iraq (foundations, some walls remain).
- Saint Elijah's Monastery, near Mosul, Iraq, is a 6th-century ruin and among the oldest monasteries in Iraq
- St. George's Church, Izra, Syria, built in the 6th century
- Saint Hripsime Church, built AD 618 in Armenia (Armenian Apostolic)
- The Hanging Church, built c. 690 on site of earlier church, possibly the oldest church building in Egypt (Coptic Orthodox)
- Ateni Sioni Church, early 7th century, Georgia
- Anchiskhati Basilica, built in the 600s, the oldest church building in Tbilisi.
- São Pedro de Balsemão, built in the 7th century, possibly oldest church building in Portugal (Roman Catholic)
- Densuş Church, built in 600s, oldest church building in Romania
- St Peter's Church, Monkwearmouth, UK, porch and west wall date from AD 674
- St Paul's Church, Jarrow, UK, parts – including the original dedication stone – date from AD 685
- St Peter's Church, Titchfield, Hampshire, UK, some parts remain from c. 680
- St Laurence's Church, Bradford-on-Avon, Wiltshire, UK, Anglo-Saxon, could have been founded by St Aldhelm c. 700 AD, although its style suggests 10th or 11th century.
- Great Church, Elst, Netherlands, church built in the 15th century, built upon and using the remains of two Gallo-Roman temples.
- Gallarus Oratory, built between the 6th and 9th centuries, Possibly the oldest church building in Ireland
- Church of Holy Cross, Nin, built in the 9th century, oldest church building in Croatia (Roman Catholic)
- Kadamattom Church, India, built in the 9th century.
- St. Mary's Forane Church, Kaduthuruthy, India, built in AD 500. Also known as Kaduthuruthy Valiya Palli
- Church of Ayios Lazaros, Larnaca, built in the 9th century, one of the oldest churches in Cyprus
- Church of SS. Peter and Paul, built at Budeč fortified settlement between 895 and 905 during rule of Spytihněv I is the oldest extant church building in the Czech Republic. The site (cf. cs:Budeč (hradiště)) is located near village of Zákolany, about 17 kilometres (11 mi) NW of Prague.
- Tkhaba-Yerdy Church, Russia, built prior to the 9th century
- Greensted Church, UK, built in the mid-9th or mid-11th century, oldest wooden church building in Europe
- Worth Church, UK, dated c. 950–1050 AD.
- Shoana Church, Russia, built in the c. 10th century
- Senty Church, Russia, built in the c. 10th century
- Church of Tarnaszentmária, built at the end of the 10th century
- The Pantheon in Rome became a church in AD 608.

== High to late Middle Ages ==
A selection of notable churches, extant from the 11th to the 14th century (AD 1000‍–‍1300).

Building	Image	Location	Country	Oldest Part	Denomination	Notes
Dalby church		Dalby, Sweden	Sweden	1060	Church of Sweden (Lutheran)	Oldest parts date to around the year 1060 and is therefore considered the oldest building in the Nordic countries; however, the only remaining parts from that time are parts of one of the walls.
Church of Our Lady		Aarhus	Denmark	1060	Lutheran	An older wooden church was on the site in the 10th century. The crypt of the church is the oldest extant stone church in Scandinavia. It is still functioning as a church.
Cathedral of Pisa		Pisa	Italy	1063	Roman Catholic	Built on the foundations of an older church. Dedicated to the Assumption of St. Mary, it is a Primatial church.
Santiago de Compostela Cathedral		Santiago de Compostela, Galicia	Spain	1075 (current church)	Roman Catholic	According to tradition, the Apostle James, son of Zebedee spread Christianity in the Iberian Peninsula. In the year 44 he was beheaded in Jerusalem and his remains were later transferred to Galicia in a stone boat. The king Alfonso II of Asturias ordered the construction of a chapel in 810s in the place. This chapel was followed by a first church in 829 and later by a pre-Romanesque church on 899, gradually becoming an important place of pilgrimage. In 997 this primitive church was reduced to ashes by Almanzor, commander of the army of the Caliphate of Cordoba. The construction of the current cathedral in the same place was built between 1075 and 1122 under the reign of Alfonso VI of León and Castile. The baroque façade of Obradoiro was made in 1740; also baroque is that of Acibecharía; that of Pratarías was built by Master Esteban in 1103; the Pórtico da Gloria, a primordial work of Romanesque sculpture, completed by Master Mateo in 1188.
Pammakaristos Church		Istanbul	Turkey	1071-1078	Orthodox Christianity; Islam after 1591;	One of the most famous Byzantine churches in Istanbul, Turkey, and was the last pre-Ottoman building to house the Ecumenical Patriarchate. Converted in 1591 into the Fethiye Mosque
Church of the Holy Mother of God, Asen's Fortress		Asen's Fortress	Bulgaria	1100–1200	Bulgarian Orthodox Church	Medieval Eastern Orthodox church located in Asen's Fortress. It lies near Asenovgrad in the Rhodope Mountains of Plovdiv Province, south central Bulgaria. Constructed most likely in the 12th century, it features two stories, of which the upper story is the church proper and the lower story is of unclear function. The rectangular tower over the church's narthex is regarded as the earliest preserved of its kind in the Balkans. Fragments of frescoes are visible on the walls of the church's upper story.
Monastery of the Pantokrator		Istanbul	Turkey	1124-1136	Orthodox Christianity; Islam shortly after 1453;	It is made up of two former Byzantine churches and a chapel joined together and represents the best example of Middle Byzantine architecture in Constantinople. After Hagia Sophia, it is the largest Byzantine religious edifice still standing in Istanbul.
Garðar Cathedral		Igaliku	Greenland	1126	Roman Catholic.	The first cathedral built in the Americas. Abandoned in the 14th century.
Church of Saint Porphyrius		Gaza City	Palestine	1150s/1160s	Greek Orthodox	Oldest active church in the city.
Notre-Dame de Paris		Paris	France	1160–1260	Roman Catholic	Medieval Catholic cathedral located in Paris, France, consecrated to the Virgin Mary and considered one of the finest examples of French Gothic architecture.
Church of St Demetrius of Thessaloniki, Veliko Tarnovo		Veliko Tarnovo	Bulgaria	1185	Bulgarian Orthodox Church	Medieval Bulgarian Orthodox Church in the city of Veliko Tarnovo in central northern Bulgaria, the former capital of the Second Bulgarian Empire. The church lies at the northeastern foot of the Trapezitsa and Tsarevets hills, on the right bank of the Yantra River, outside the city's medieval fortifications. Architecturally, it has a pentahedral apse and a cross-domed design with a narthex and a fore-apse space. It was once part of a large monastery and belonged in its southeastern part. The church's exterior is decorated with blind arches and colourful ornaments: glazed rosettes, suns, rhombs and other painted figures. The church was built of stone alternated with three rows of bricks. It is 15.75 by 8.40 metres (51.7 ft × 27.6 ft) in size. The church was the place where the anti-Byzantine Uprising of Asen and Peter was proclaimed in 1185; it was this uprising that led to the reestablishment of the Bulgarian Empire and the proclamation of Tarnovo for its capital.
Holy Forty Martyrs Church, Veliko Tarnovo	Exterior	Veliko Tarnovo	Bulgaria	1230	Bulgarian Orthodox Church	Medieval Eastern Orthodox church constructed in 1230 in the town of Veliko Tarnovo in Bulgaria, the former capital of the Second Bulgarian Empire. The Holy Forty Martyrs Church, an elongated six-columned basilica, has three semicircular apses and a narrow narthex from the west. Another building was added later to the west side of the church. The church interior was covered with mural painting probably in 1230. On the western addition some of the outer decoration survived revealing the traditional arches and coloured small ceramic plates inserted into the wall. It is not clear if the church has frescoes painted on the outer walls. Some of the Bulgarian Empire's most significant historical records are stored in the church, including Omurtag's Column, Asen's Column and the Border Column from Rodosto from the rule of Khan Krum.
St. Michael's Church		Vienna	Austria	1220–1240	Roman Catholic	One of the oldest churches in Vienna, Austria, and also one of its few remaining Romanesque buildings. Dedicated to the Archangel Michael, St. Michael's Church is located at Michaelerplatz across from St. Michael's Gate at the Hofburg Palace.
Church of Saints Peter and Paul, Veliko Tarnovo		Veliko Tarnovo	Bulgaria	1218–1241	Bulgarian Orthodox Church	Medieval Bulgarian Orthodox church in the city of Veliko Tarnovo in central northern Bulgaria, the former capital of the Second Bulgarian Empire. The 13th-century church lies at the foot of the Tsarevets hill's northern slopes and was reconstructed in 1981. The church is dedicated to the Christian Apostles Saint Peter and Saint Paul. It follows the cross-domed design and has a single apse. The cella is divided into three naves by two rows of columns. The columns' capitals are decorated with plastic carving and tracery. The church has a high, massive iconostasis. According to the 14th-century account of Patriarch Evtimiy, the church and the surrounding monastery were built on the order of Tsar Ivan Asen II's (ruled 1218–1241) wife Anna.
Hagia Sophia, Trabzon		Trabzon	Turkey	1238-1263	Orthodox Christianity; Islam after 1584;	The building dates back to the thirteenth century, when Trabzon was the capital of the Empire of Trebizond. It is one of a few dozen Byzantine sites extant in the area and has been described as being "regarded as one of the finest examples of Byzantine architecture".
Ascension Cathedral, Veliko Tarnovo		Veliko Tarnovo	Bulgaria	1331–1371	Bulgarian Orthodox Church	Reconstructed Eastern Orthodox cathedral in the city of Veliko Tarnovo, in north central Bulgaria. Located on top of the fortified Tsarevets hill in the former capital of the Second Bulgarian Empire, the cathedral was the seat of the Bulgarian patriarch from its construction in the 11th–12th century to its destruction in 1393. Standing on top of a late Roman church, the cathedral, reconstructed in the 1970s and 1980s, follows a cross-domed plan with a bell tower and a triple apse. Richly decorated on both the exterior and interior, its internal walls now feature modern frescoes, the presence of which has meant that it has not been reconsecrated. Though not active as a Christian place of worship, it has been open for visitors since 1985.
Church of Christ Pantocrator, Nesebar		Nesebar	Bulgaria	1331–1371	Bulgarian Orthodox Church	Medieval Eastern Orthodox church in the eastern Bulgarian town of Nesebar (medieval Mesembria), on the Black Sea coast of Burgas Province. Part of the Ancient Nesebar UNESCO World Heritage Site, the Church of Christ Pantocrator was constructed in the 13th–14th century and is best known for its lavish exterior decoration. The church, today an art gallery, survives largely intact and is among Bulgaria's best preserved churches of the Middle Ages.
Church of Saint Paraskevi, Nesebar		Nesebar	Bulgaria	1331–1371	Bulgarian Orthodox Church	Partially preserved medieval Eastern Orthodox church in Nesebar (medieval Mesembria), a town on the Black Sea coast of Burgas Province in eastern Bulgaria. It was most likely built in the 13th or 14th century and forms part of the Ancient Nesebar UNESCO World Heritage Site. The Church of Saint Paraskevi features a single nave and a pentagonal apse as well as rich exterior decoration. Its dome and the belfry surmounting the narthex have not been preserved today, and it is unknown which of the three saints named Paraskevi it was dedicated to.

- Christ Church Cathedral, Dublin, Ireland, built c. 1030
- St. Margaret's Chapel, built in the 11th century, possibly the oldest church building in Scotland
- Saviour Cathedral (Chernihiv), Ukraine, built in the 1030s
- Saint Sophia Cathedral (Kyiv), Ukraine, built in the 1030s
- Saint Cyril's Monastery (Kyiv), Ukraine, founded in 1140
- Arkhyz churches, Russia, 10th to 13th centuries
- Novgorod Cathedral, Russia, built between 1045 and 1050
- Old Aker Church (Norwegian: Gamle Aker kirke) is a medieval church located in Oslo. An active parish, the church is the oldest existing building in Oslo from 1080.
- Church of the Holy Sepulchre, rebuilt in 1089, in Jerusalem is venerated as Golgotha (the Hill of Calvary), where Jesus was crucified, and is said also to contain the place where Jesus was buried (the Sepulchre) (some walls from earlier structure may exist), (Greek Orthodox, Roman Catholic, Armenian Apostolic Orthodox, Syrian Orthodox, Coptic Orthodox, and Ethiopian Orthodox)
- Church of St. Adalbert, Kraków, Kraków, Poland, built in the 11th century, possibly the oldest church building in Poland
- Saint Sophia Cathedral in Polotsk, Belarus, 18th-century building with an 11th-century apse
- Abbey of Romainmôtier: a 5th-century church was rebuilt in the 7th century, and again between 990 and 1030. The church building remained mostly unchanged since the 11th century, and qualifies as one of the oldest romanesque buildings in Switzerland.
- Lund Cathedral, built in 1123, possibly the oldest church in Sweden (although part of Denmark in 1123) (formerly Catholic, now Lutheran)
- St. Mary's Cathedral, Limerick, Ireland, founded in 1168.
- St. Peter's Church, Hamburg and St. Nicholas' Church, Hamburg, Hamburg, Germany. Building started 1189, rebuilt several times due to fire and war but still standing in their original positions today.
- St. Audoen's Church, Dublin, Ireland, founded in 1190.
- St. Patrick's Cathedral, Dublin, Ireland, founded in 1191.
- Church of Saint George, Lalibela, Ethiopia, built in the 12th century, one of the oldest church buildings in Ethiopia (Ethiopian Orthodox Church)
- Church of St. Panteleimon (Nerezi), built in the 12th century, one of the oldest church buildings in Macedonia
- Kalozha Church, the oldest extant church building in Belarus, 12th century.
- Church of Kish, one of the oldest extant churches in Azerbaijan, 12th or 13th century.
- Basilica of Saint Servatius, church congregation dating to 384 AD, current building built from 11th to 13th centuries, oldest congregation and possibly the oldest church building in the Netherlands (Roman Catholic)
- Thiruvithamcode Arappally (Arappally means Royal Church) Kanyakumari District is the oldest Church building that still exists in India.
- St. Canice's Cathedral, Kilkenny, Ireland, built between 1202 and 1285.
- St. Nicholas Church, Vilnius, Lithuania, is the oldest surviving church in Lithuania. Originally built in the 14th century.
- Hvalsey Church, located in Hvalsey (modern-day Qaqortoq), Greenland, Kingdom of Denmark, is the oldest surviving church (no longer in use, in ruins) in the Americas. Originally built in the 14th century as a Catholic church, although archaeology suggests it was constructed on the site of a previous church.
- Trondenes Church, (Norwegian: Trondenes kirke) is the northernmost medieval stone church of Norway and the world's northernmost surviving medieval building. Finished and opened in 1435.

== Early modern ==
Notable early churches built in the New World between the 15th and 19th centuries. Listed are especially the oldest extant church buildings by country.

- Church of Saint Francis, Kochi, India, built 1504–1516, oldest European church building in India (Church of South India)
- Our Lady of Light Church, Chennai, India built in 1516 by Portuguese (Roman Catholic)
- Catedral de Santa María la Menor, commissioned by Pope Julius II in 1504, and built 1514–1540. It is the oldest standing church in the Americas and the oldest church building in the Dominican Republic (Roman Catholic)
- Church of Saint Paul, Malacca, Malaysia, built in 1521 as a Roman Catholic chapel and finally abandoned in 1753. It is the oldest known church building in Malaysia
- Cathedral of San Juan Bautista, Puerto Rico, built in 1521, oldest church building in the United States (Roman Catholic)
- Santhome Church, Chennai built in 1523 by Portuguese over the tomb of Saint Thomas the Apostle is a most important site for Christians in the world (Roman Catholic).
- Chapel of Ermita del Rosario, Mexico, built in 1523, oldest chapel in Mexico
- Santo Willibrordus Church, Indonesia, built in 1523, the oldest surviving church in Indonesia (Roman Catholic)
- The church of La Balbanera, Ecuador, was constructed in 1534, making it the oldest church constructed by the Spaniards in Ecuador
- Chapel of San Jacinto, Guatemala, founded in 1524, one of the oldest churches in Guatemala (Roman Catholic)
- Franciscan Chapel of the Red Cross, Jamaica, built in 1525, one of the oldest Spanish cathedrals in the New World (Roman Catholic)
- St. Dominic's Church, Macau, China, built in 1527 by three Dominican Priests (Roman Catholic)
- Church of Saints Cosme and Damião, built in 1535, in the city of Igarassu, Pernambuco. Brazil's oldest church (Roman Catholic).
- Cebu Metropolitan Cathedral, Cebu, Philippines established in 1565, previously named as the Church of St. Vitales and is the first church erected in the Philippines.(Roman Catholic)
- Mexico City Metropolitan Cathedral, built 1574–1813, one of the oldest churches in Mexico (Roman Catholic)
- Old West Kirk, Greenock, 1591, the first Protestant church built in Scotland post Reformation (Church of Scotland)
- Cathedral of the Immaculate Conception in Beijing, founded in 1604, possibly the oldest continuous church congregation in China (Roman Catholic)
- San Agustin Church, Manila, built in 1607, one of the oldest church buildings in the Philippines. (Roman Catholic)
- First Jamestown Church (foundations), 1607, first Protestant church in what would become the USA (Episcopal)
- San Miguel Mission, Santa Fe, New Mexico, USA, built in 1610, oldest church building in the continental U.S. (Roman Catholic)
- Ruins of St. Paul's, China, built in 1627 (Roman Catholic)
- St. James Church, Barbados, founded 1627, oldest congregation in Barbados (Anglican)
- St. Columb's Cathedral, Derry, completed in 1633, first Protestant cathedral to be built in Europe
- St. Luke's Church, USA, built in 1682 (Episcopal)
- Jamestown Church (tower), (Episcopal)
- Old Ship Church, USA, built in 1681 (Congregationalist, later Unitarian)
- Notre-Dame-des-Victoires, Quebec City, built 1687–1723, later extensively rebuilt, Possibly the oldest church building in Canada (Roman Catholic)
- Zion Church, Jakarta, Indonesia, the church was built in 1695, the oldest standing church structure in the city.
- Cathedral of San Fernando, San Antonio, Texas, USA, built between 1738 and 1750, the oldest cathedral sanctuary in the United States
- St. Paul's Church (Halifax), built 1750, Possibly the oldest Protestant church building in Canada (Anglican)
- Blenduk Church, built in 1753 complete with a Baroque Organ from the 18th century, it is the oldest church in Central Java, Indonesia.
- Christ Church Melaka, built in 1753 as a Dutch Reformed church, it now houses an Anglican congregation. It is the oldest Protestant church building in Malaysia
- Mission San Diego de Alcalá, built in 1769 by Junipero Serra, is a functioning Roman Catholic church and the oldest in California (United States). It sits at the base of El Camino Real, the road going northward in California that is punctuated by missions about a day's walk apart.
- St. Anne's Church, constructed by the Portuguese in 1792, built in European and Gothic styles, one of the oldest Churches in South India, in Virajpet, Coorg.
- Her Majesty's Royal Chapel of the Mohawks, constructed in 1785 for the Mohawk people led by Joseph Brant, first Protestant church in Upper Canada (Anglican)
- Church of the Holy Ascension, USA, built in 1826, oldest church building in Alaska (Russian Orthodox)
- Armenian Church, Singapore, built 1835, oldest church in Singapore
- Mokuaikaua Church, USA, built in 1837, oldest church congregation and building in Hawaii (Congregational)
- Christ Church Royal Chapel, established in 1784, built in 1843 by the Mohawk people to symbolise their alliance with the British Crown (Anglican)
- Saigon Notre-Dame Basilica, Possibly oldest church building in Vietnam, built 1863–1880 (Roman Catholic)
- Ōura Church, built in 1864, Possibly the oldest church building in Japan (Roman Catholic)
- Wanchin Basilica of the Immaculate Conception, Taiwan, built in 1870, oldest chapel in Taiwan (Roman Catholic)
- Myeongdong Cathedral, built between 1892–1898, the oldest church building in South Korea (Roman Catholic)
- Living Water Church, built 1909, one of the oldest Pentecostal Church buildings in the World. Built 3 years after Azusa St. Revival in San Francisco, 1906 (Charismatic Church)

== See also ==
- Church architecture
- Church (building)
- List of the oldest buildings in the world
