= Ermita de la Magdalena (Monsacro) =

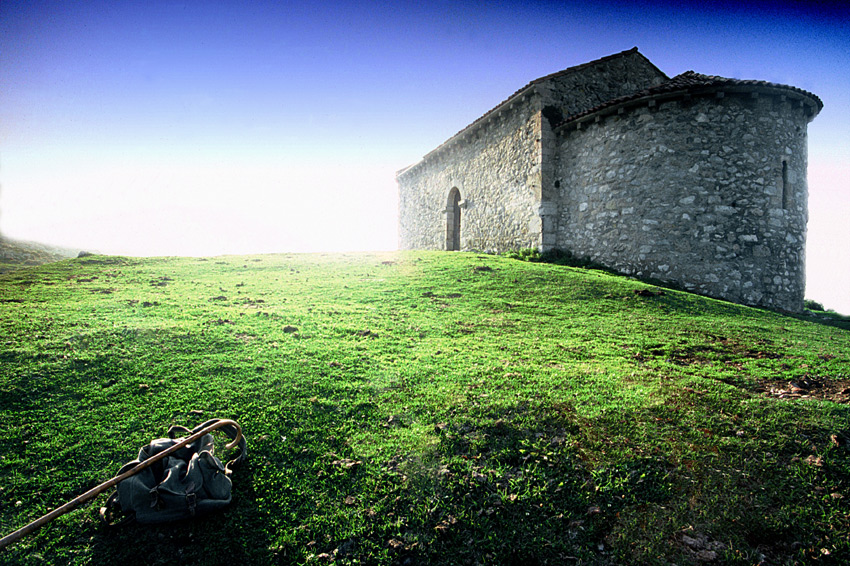
- Ermita de la Magdalena (Monsacro)
- 43.264788°N 5.889418°W
- Location: Asturias, Spain

Ermita de la Magdalena (Monsacro) is a Roman Catholic hermitage in the municipality of Morcín, an autonomous community in Asturias, Spain. It is located near the peak of Monsacro. It was listed as a historical monument in 1992.

The hermitage was built in the late 13th century.

It is close to the Ermita de Santiago (Monsacro).

== See also ==
- Asturian art
- Catholic Church in Spain
- Churches in Asturias
- List of oldest church buildings
