= Simpsonville Christian Church =

Historic church in Kentucky, United States

- U.S. National Register of Historic Places
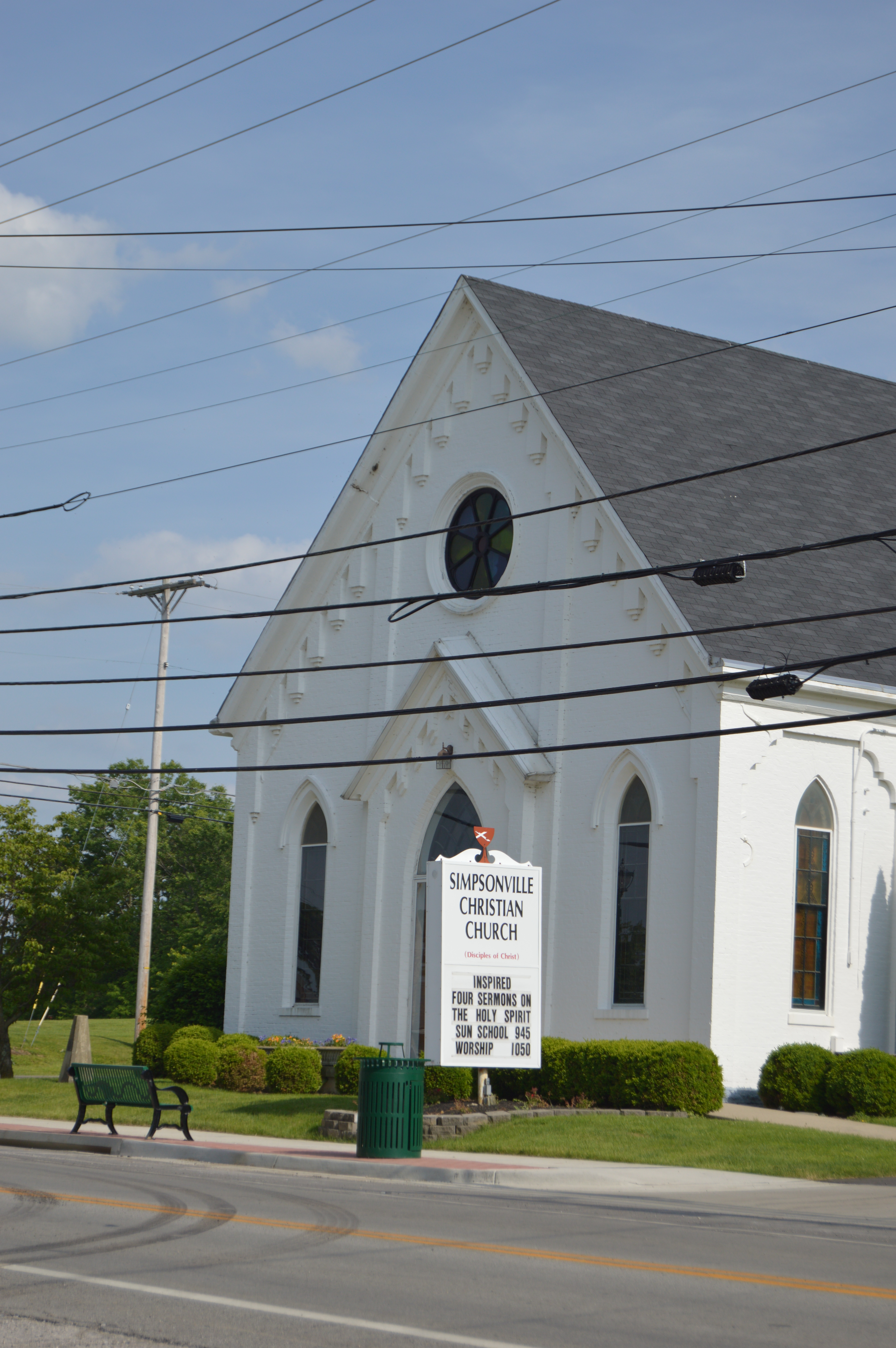
- Front

- Location within Kentucky Location within the United States
- Location: US 60, Simpsonville, Kentucky
- Coordinates: 38°13′9″N 85°21′33″W
- Area: 0.3 acres (0.12 ha)
- Built: 1875
- Built by: Brown, Morris; Frazier, Jim
- Architectural style: Gothic
- MPS: Shelby County MRA
- NRHP reference No.: 88002881
- Added to NRHP: December 27, 1988

The Simpsonville Christian Church is a historic church on US 60 in Simpsonville, Kentucky. It was built in 1875 and added to the National Register of Historic Places in 1988.

It is believed to have been built on the site of a former slave market.

== See also ==
- Simpsonville Methodist Church, also NRHP-listed
