= Ermita de Santiago (Monsacro) =

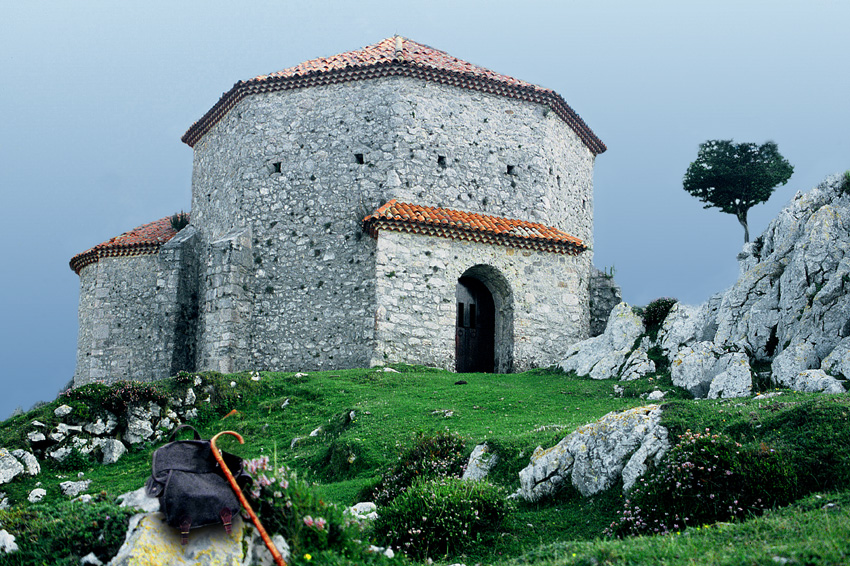
- Ermita de Santiago (Monsacro)
- 43.261526°N 5.890839°W
- Location: Asturias, Spain

Ermita de Santiago (Monsacro) is an ancient stone octagonal Roman Catholic hermitage in the municipality of Morcín, an autonomous community in Asturias, Spain. It is located near the peak of Monsacro and another hermitage called the Ermita de la Magdalena.

== See also ==
- Asturian art
- Catholic Church in Spain
- Churches in Asturias
- List of oldest church buildings
