= Church of Santiago de Gobiendes =

Cultural property in Colunga, Spain

Church of Saint James of Gobiendes Iglesia de Santiago de Gobiendes (in Spanish)
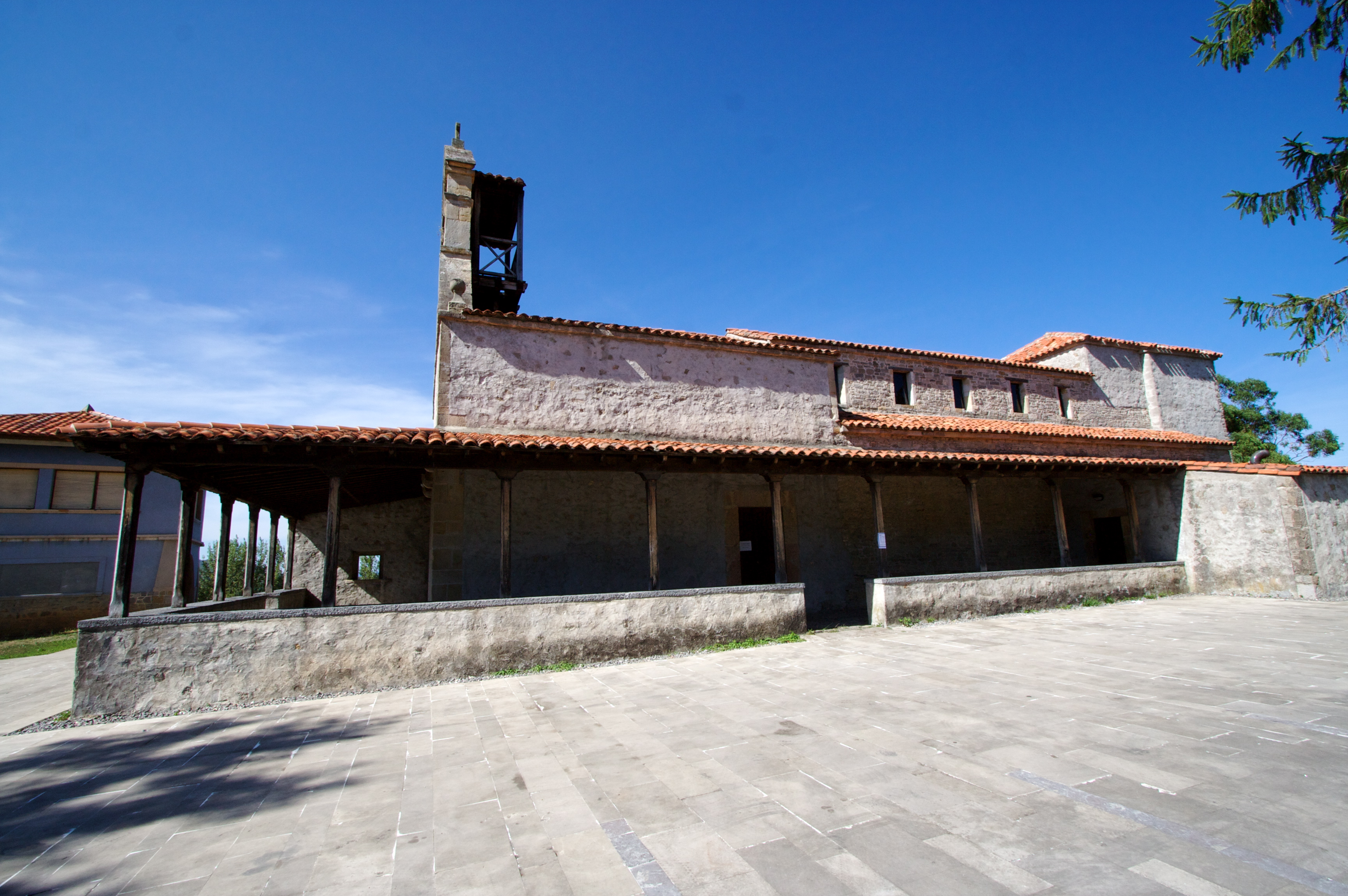

Religion
- Affiliation: Roman Catholic
- Province: Asturias
- Ecclesiastical or organisational status: Church
- Year consecrated: 9th century

Location
- Location: Gobiendes, Spain
- Interactive map of Church of Saint James of Gobiendes; Iglesia de Santiago de Gobiendes (in Spanish)
- Coordinates: 43°28′1.1″N 5°14′19.7″W

Architecture
- Type: Church
- Style: Pre-Romanesque

Specifications
- Length: 26 metres (85 ft)
- Width: 12 metres (39 ft)
- Width (nave): 8.6 metres (28 ft)

Saint James of Gobiendes (Spanish: Iglesia de Santiago de Gobiendes) is a Roman Catholic pre-romanesque church, located in Gobiendes, next to Colunga, Asturias, Spain. It was built during the reign of Alfonso II of Asturias, its structure is typical of pre-romanesque Asturian architecture.

It underwent through an important remodeling in 1853, being further restored in 1946 and in 1983.

== See also ==
- Asturian architecture
- Catholic Church in Spain
