= Church of Santo Adriano de Tuñón =

Church in Tuñón, Asturias, Spain

Saint Adrian of Tuñón Santo Adriano de Tuñón (in Spanish)
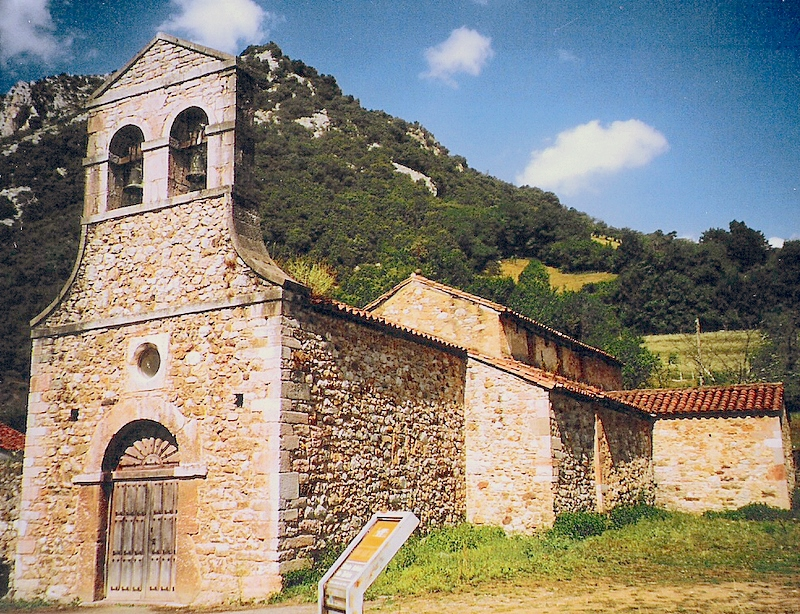

Religion
- Affiliation: Roman Catholic
- Province: Asturias
- Ecclesiastical or organisational status: Church
- Year consecrated: 891

Location
- Location: Santo Adriano, Spain
- Interactive map of Saint Adrian of Tuñón; Santo Adriano de Tuñón (in Spanish)
- Coordinates: 43°17′29.9″N 5°58′49.9″W

Architecture
- Type: Church
- Style: Pre-Romanesque

Specifications
- Length: 14 metres (46 ft)
- Width: 10 metres (33 ft)

The Church of Santo Adriano de Tuñón (Spanish: Iglesia de Santo Adriano de Tuñón) is a Roman Catholic Pre-Romanesque church in the village of Tuñón, Asturias, Spain, dedicated to Saint Adrian.

The church is located on the bank of the River Trubia, next to an old Roman road. Founded on January 24, 891, by Alfonso III of Asturias and his wife Jimena of Navarra as a monastery church, it went through large transformations at the beginnings of the 12th century. It was declared a Spanish national monument in June 1931.

== Architecture ==
The church stands on a classic basilica ground plan, although in the 17th and 18th centuries it was extended with a nave structure at the western end, and a bell gable.

== Decoration ==
Mural paintings were rediscovered in the 20th century. The fresco paintings in this church are the only remains of Mozarabic painters' work in an Asturian art workshop.

== See also ==
- Asturian art
- Catholic Church in Spain
