= Beta Samati =

Archaeological site in Tigray Region, Ethiopia

- Archaeological site
- Location in Ethiopia
- Coordinates: 14.3434°N 39.0353°E
- Country: Ethiopia
- Region: Tigray Region

Beta Samati (or Betä Sämaʿti, meaning 'house of audience' in Tigrinya) is an archaeological site near Yeha, Tigray Region, northern Ethiopia. It was an Aksumite settlement that was occupied from around 750 BC until the 7th century AD.

== Discovery ==
In 2009, the Southern Red Sea Archaeological Histories (SRSAH) Project, which also surveyed over 80 different archaeological sites from 2009 to 2016, discovered the site of the town ruins under a mound adjacent to the village of Edaga Rabu (Tigrinya: ዕዳጋ ሮቡዕ), located 6.5 km northeast of Yeha, Ethiopia.

== Excavations ==
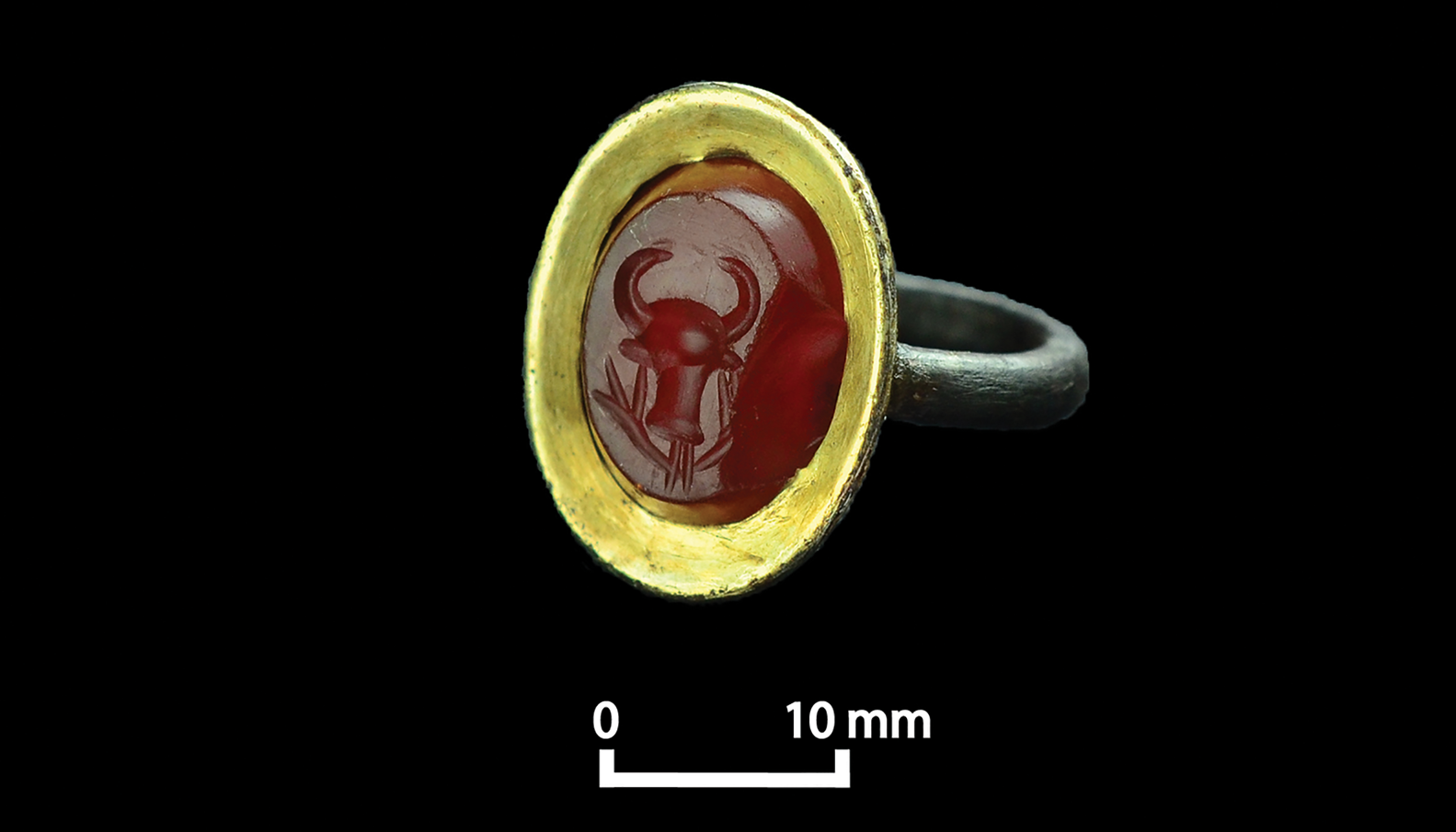
Bucrania-themed ring found within the basilica at Beta Samati.

In 2015, excavations of the site were funded by the Archaeological Institute of America. In 2016, the National Geographic Society funded excavations at the Beta Samati site.

Discoveries at the archaeological site included a basilica dating to the 4th century AD, a gold intaglio ring engraved with a bull's head, stone pendant, bucranium, stamp seal, incense burners, cow figurines, and coins depicting Kings Armah and Ezana. The basilica may be the earliest known Christian building in sub-Saharan Africa. The mixing of Christian and bucranial motifs at the site suggests a complex religious tradition at this late antique site.

== See also ==
- Ona culture
- Matara, Eritrea
- Aksum
- Kingdom of Aksum
- Ethiopian Christianity
