= Salcajá =

- Municipality
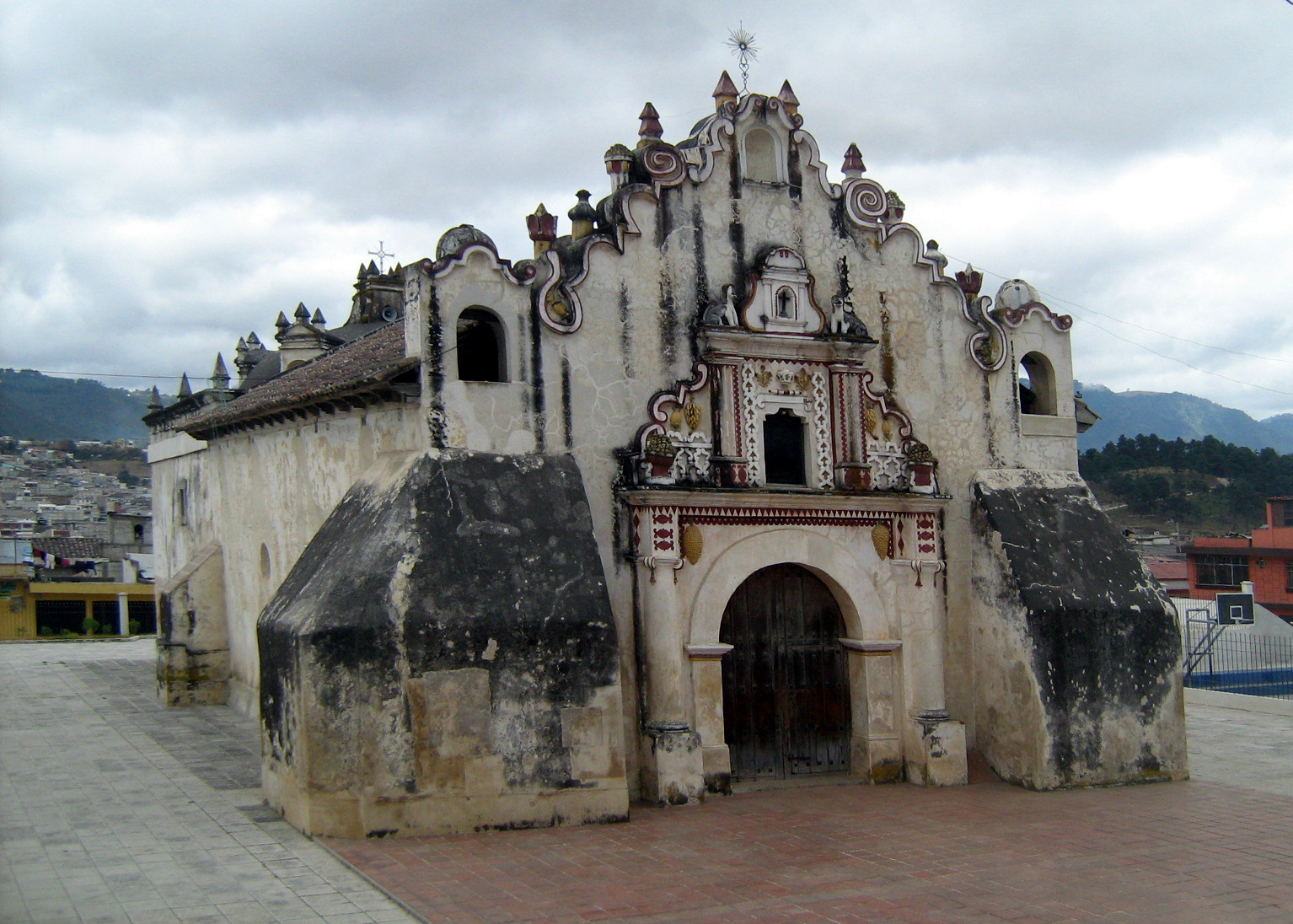
- Church of San Jacinto in Salcajá, Guatemala.

- Location in Guatemala
- Coordinates: 14°53′N 91°27′W
- Country: Guatemala
- Department: Quetzaltenango
- Municipality: Salcajá

Government
  - Type: Municipal

Area
  - Municipality: 12 km^{2} (4.6 sq mi)
  - Land: 11.8 km^{2} (4.6 sq mi)
- Elevation: 2,322 m (7,618 ft)

Population (Census 2018)
  - Municipality: 19,434
  - Density: 1,650/km^{2} (4,270/sq mi)
  - Urban: 17,042
  - Religions: Roman Catholicism Evangelicalism Maya
- Climate: Cwb
- Website: Site

Salcajá is a town and municipality in Quetzaltenango department of Guatemala.

Salcajá is best known for the Church of San Jacinto, founded in 1524, which was the first church built in Central America since it was one of the first places invaded in the Spanish conquest of Guatemala. It is also known as La Conquistadora ("The Conqueress", "The Conqueror") presumably because of the time period and its religious influence on the indigenous population. After 490 years and several earthquakes, the building still is in relatively good condition. The church is open to the public for special events and on holidays. Visitors are now welcomed at the adjoined museum most mornings.

This town is also known for its manufacture of corte, the traditional Mayan dress for women. tellars are found in 5 out of 10 houses.

Technically, local artisans specialize in the complex jaspe (ikat) resist-dyeing method, where tie-dyed cotton threads are hand-woven on foot and backstrap looms to create intricate geometric patterns for indigenous skirts across the Guatemalan highlands.

This little town is also known for its production of Red Liquor or Caldo de Frutas ("Fruit Juice"). This homemade liquor is vivid red in color due to the brewing of hibiscus flower with several native fruits. Rompopo, a yellow alcoholic beverage made from eggs, is also manufactured in the town.

The Saint of the town of Salcaja is St. Louis, King of France. He is celebrated with a carnival which runs from August 15 through the 28 but [among this] during the celebration they also have many other carnivals that are either in the town or as close as 15 minutes away.

Salcaja has a soccer team, called "America F.C.". The team members wear black and white striped jerseys, and they are in the second division of the Guatemalan league. Every year around August Salcajá's team plays against one of the strongest teams in the Major league, "Xelaju M.C." It is usually played at home in Salcajá in the "Estadio Panorama" which is in the suburbs of Salcajá.
