= Mattiaci =

Ancient Germanic tribe

Rhine frontier of the Roman empire, 70 AD, showing the location of the Mattiaci in Germania Magna near the Rhine. Roman territory is shaded dark

The Mattiaci were by Tacitus recorded as an ancient Germanic tribe and related to the Chatti, their Germanic neighbors to the east. There is no clear definition of what the tribe's name meant. The Dictionary of Greek and Roman Geography suggests that the name is derived from a combination of 'matte', meaning 'a meadow', and 'ach' (pronounced with the 'ch' as in 'loch'), signifying water or a bath.

The Mattiaci were settled on border of the Roman Empire on the right side of the Rhine in the area of present-day Wiesbaden (Aquae Mattiacorum), the southern Taunus, and the Wetterau. Archaeological evidence of Wiesbaden cannot prove their alleged origin. While the worship of various Gaulic deities like Sirona or Epona is attested, there is so far no evidence for Germanic gods nor for specific products of Germanic origin.

Tacitus relates that they were not required to pay tribute to the Romans but were to provide assistance in war and thus were an outpost of Roman rule on the border with Germania. He refers to them in his Germania (ch 29) in relation to the Batavians:

[The Batavians] are not under the contempt of paying tribute, nor subject to be squeezed by the farmers of the revenue. Free from all impositions and payments, and only set apart for the purposes of fighting, they are reserved wholly for the wars, in the same manner as a magazine of weapons and armour. Under the same degree of homage are the nation of the Mattiacians. For such is the might and greatness of the Roman People, as to have carried the awe and esteem of their Empire beyond the Rhine and the ancient boundaries. Thus the Mattiacians, living upon the opposite banks, enjoy a settlement and limits of their own; yet in spirit and inclination are attached to us: in other things resembling the Batavians, save that as they still breathe their original air, still possess their primitive soil, they are thence inspired with superior vigour and keenness.

With the Chatti, the Mattaci took part in the Revolt of the Batavi in 69 AD, besieging the Roman city of Mogontiacum (present-day Mainz). After the foundation of the Limes Germanicus, the tribal identity of the Mattiaci seems to have eroded away. When the municipality of the Civitas Mattiacorum had been established unter emperor Trajan, the citizens of Aquae Mattiacorum referred to themselves as vicani Aquaenses instead of "Mattiaci".

In the late 1st century AD, Valerius Martialis mentions a kind of soap that was named for the Mattiaci and may have been a local product:

Sapo:

Si mutare paras longaevos cana capillos,
Accipe Mattiacas - quo tibi calva? - pilas.

Soap:
If you want to change your highly aged hair,

use Pilae Mattiacae - why have a bald head?

A Cohors II Mattiacorum Milliaria Equitata has been attested by several finds in the Roman province of Moesia inferior (e.g. at Sostra). It may have originated in Mattiaci recruited after the Revolt of the Batavi. The Notitia Dignitatum, an early 5th century document, lists two auxilia palatina, the Mattiaci seniores and the Mattiaci iuniores. The references imply Mattiaci in Roman service.

== Fictional references ==
- Two main characters of the novel series Romanike are Romanized Mattiaci.

== See also ==
- Chatti
- Batavians
- List of Germanic peoples
