= Aqaba Church =

Church building in Aqaba, Jordan

- كنيسة العقبة
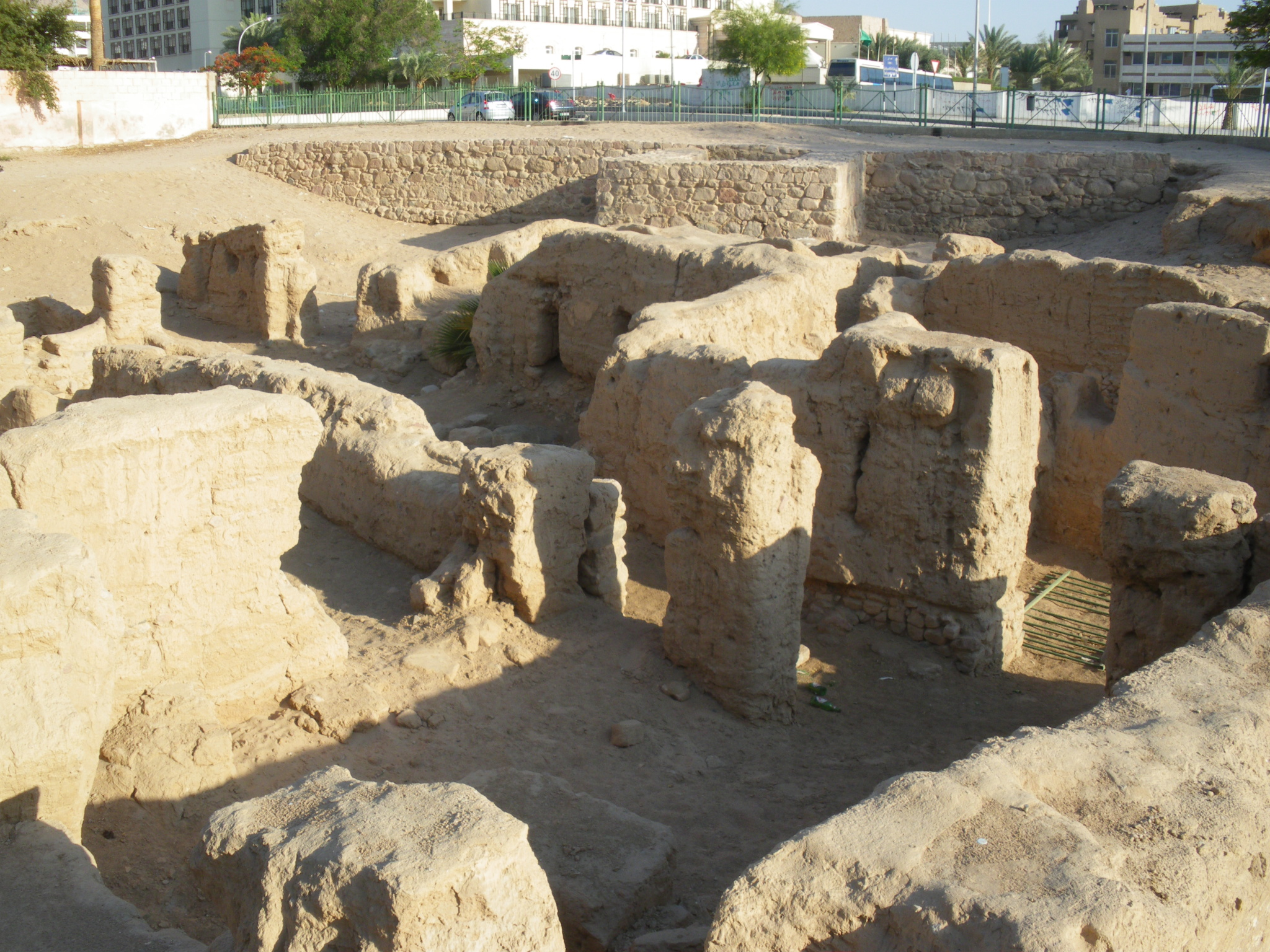
- Ruins of the church

- Location within Jordan
- 29.533787°N 34.999025°E
- Location: Aqaba
- Country: Jordan
- Denomination: Early Christianity

History
- Status: Inactive
- Founded: 293; 1733 years ago

Architecture
- Functional status: Ruins (possibly destroyed)
- Style: Basilica
- Completed: 293 AD
- Demolished: 363 AD (earthquake)

Administration
- Parish: Aila (extinct)

Aqaba Church is a historic 3rd-century church located in Aqaba, Jordan. It was unearthed in 1998 by a group of archaeologists and is considered to be the world's oldest-known purpose-built Christian church. Its first phase was dated between 293 and 303, which makes it older than the Church of the Holy Sepulchre in Jerusalem and the Church of the Nativity in Bethlehem, both of which were built in the late 320s.

Its peripheral location within the Roman Empire is likely to have saved it from destruction during the Great Persecution that broke out just a few years after the church's construction.

== Discovery and identification as a church ==
The site was discovered in the Jordanian coastal city of Aqaba in June 1998 by a group of archaeologists who soon started unearthing the ruins. The archaeologists soon realized the uniqueness of the church by its architectural style, which refuted the perception among historians that the earliest churches in Jordan all dated from the late 4th century. Older churches discovered in other parts of the world were not originally used as such, a famous case being the 3rd-century house church at Dura-Europos.

North Carolina State University archaeologist S. Thomas Parker, who led the excavations, identified the building as a church based on its basilical form, eastward orientation, and some specific finds such as glass lamps. One tomb from the adjacent cemetery contained parts of a bronze cross, which would indicate that it belonged to a Christian. It is documented that in 325, at the First Council of Nicaea, a bishop of Aila was among the participants. Aila is the Roman and Byzantine name of Aqaba, and the existence of a bishop indicates that Aila had a substantial Christian population by that time. Slightly more recent but similarly built mud-brick churches are known from Egypt.

== History ==
The Aqaba church was built sometime in the late third or the beginning of the fourth century, as indicated by the pottery finds from its foundations. Its first phase was dated between 293 and 303, which makes it older than the Church of the Holy Sepulchre in Jerusalem and the Church of the Nativity in Bethlehem, both of which were built in the late 320s. It predates Diocletian's anti-Christian persecution of 303-313, one of the greatest in Roman history, during which the building was apparently abandoned. The Great Persecution resulted in the removal of several Christian buildings in the region; this church's well-preserved status is attributed to its peripheral location within the Roman Empire. Sometime between the end of Diocletian's persecution wave and the year 330, the church was refurbished and stayed in use until its destruction during the catastrophic earthquake of 363. Its demise is dated on the basis of the latest coins found there by archaeologist, which are from 337-361. Once abandoned, the ruined building was soon filled by wind-blown sand, which helped preserve its walls to a remarkable height.

== Description ==
The building had the shape of a large three-aisled basilica, with a narthex, and oriented on an east-west axis. It measured 85 feet (26 m) by 53 feet (16 m), was built of mud-brick over stone foundations, with probably vaulted nave and aisles, and arched doorways. Remains of a staircase suggest that it had a second storey. The nave ended in a chancel area followed by a rectangular apse.

Archaeologists discovered walls up to 4.5 metres (15 ft) high, the foundations of a chancel screen, a collection box with coins, fragments of glass-made oil lamps, and a cemetery with 24 skeletons immediately adjacent to the church.

The church initially accommodated approximately 60 worshippers, and was expanded after the Diocletianic Persecution to accommodate up to 100 worshippers.

== See also ==
- Oldest churches in the world
