= Castañeo'l Monte =

Parish in Santo Adriano, Spain

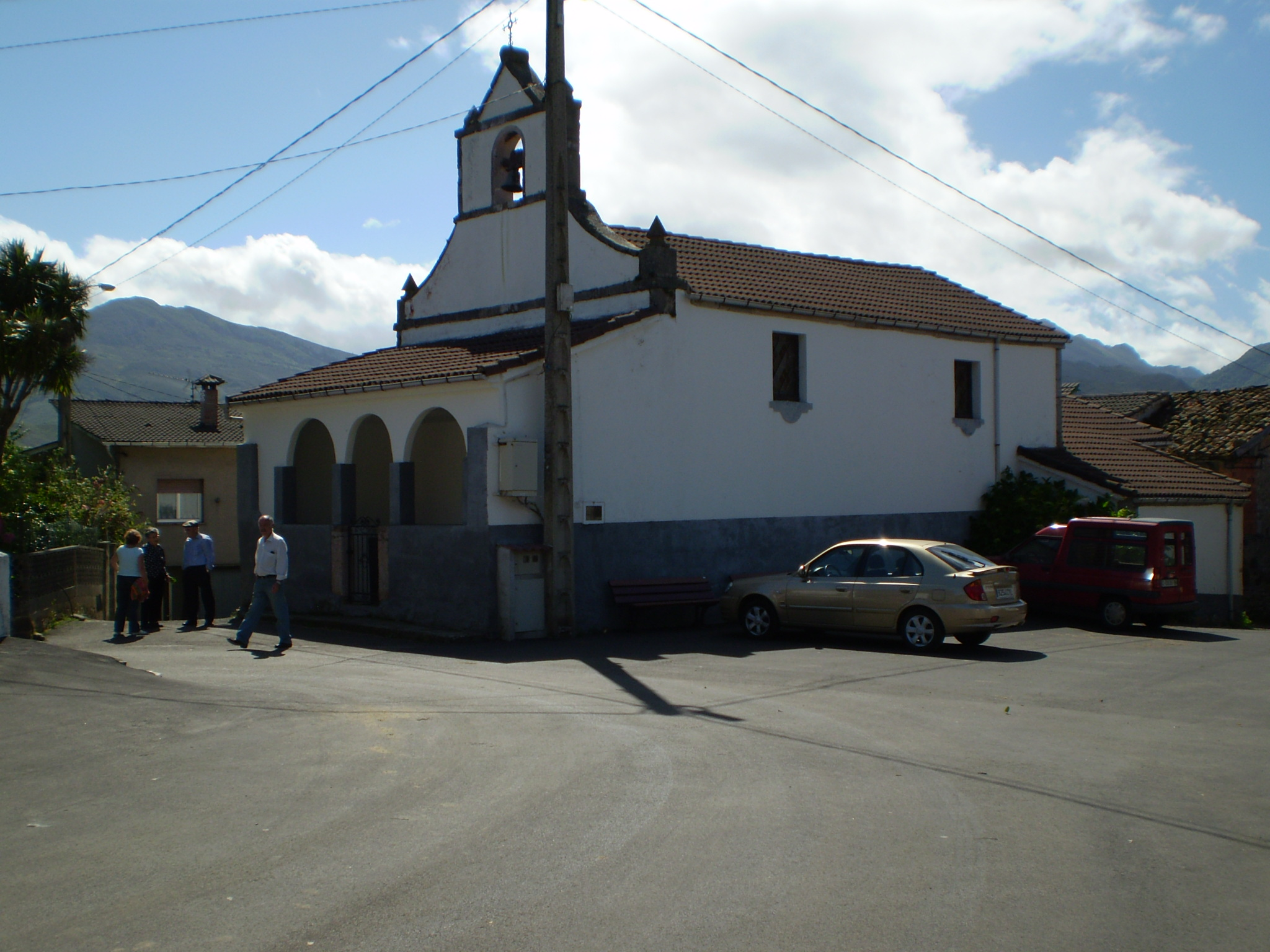
Church of Castañeo'l Monte in Santo Adriano, Asturias, 2008

Castañeo'l Monte ("Castañedo del Monte" in Spanish) 43°17′30″N 5°59′56″W is a parish in Santo Adriano, a municipality within the province and autonomous community of Asturias, in northern Spain.

The elevation is 580 m (1,900 ft) above sea level. It is 4.28 km^{2} (1.65 sq mi) in size. The population is 36 (2007). The postal code is 33115.

The Asturian people of this parish live in several villages:

- Castañeo'l Monte
- El Cabezu
- Los Niseiros

Fiesta days include:

- San Romano, 9 August
- Arcángel San Gabriel, 29 September
- San Antonio, 13 June
