= Villanueva (Santo Adriano) =

Villanueva is a parish in Santo Adriano, a municipality within the province and autonomous community of Asturias, in northern Spain.

It is 3.36 km^{2} (1.30 sq mi) in size. The population in 2006 was 119. The postal code is 33115.

The Asturian people of this parish celebrate feast days:

- Carmen, 16 July
- San Román, 9 August
