= Llavares =

Coordinates: 43°17′26″N 5°57′37″W

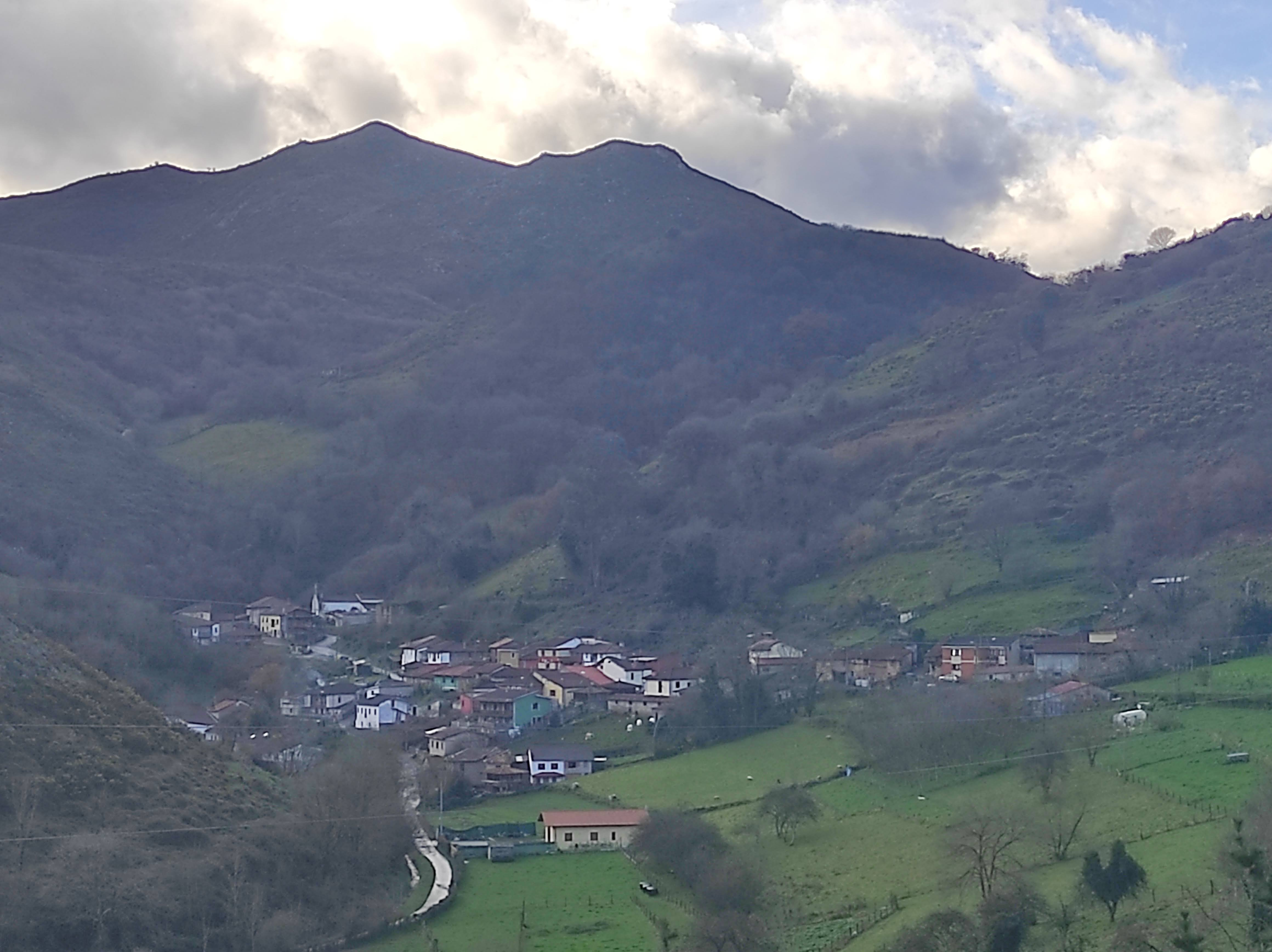

Llavares is a parish in Santo Adriano, a municipality within the province and autonomous community of Asturias, in northern Spain.

The elevation is 440 m (1,440 ft) above sea level. It is 3.67 km^{2} (1.42 sq mi) in size. The population is 39 (2006). The postal code is 33115.

The Asturian people of this parish live in two villages:

- Cuatumonteros
- Llavares

Fiesta days include:

- "Feast of Flowers", the last Sunday of May
- San Antonio, 13 June
