= Santo Adriano =

- Municipality
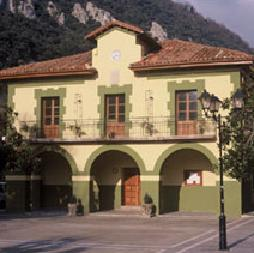
- Town hall of Santo Adriano

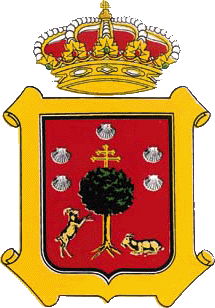
- Coat of arms

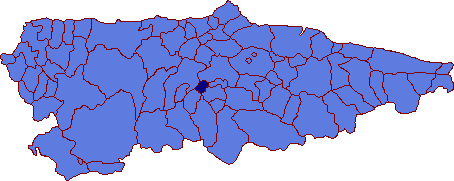

- Location in Spain
- Coordinates: 43°19′N 5°59′W
- Country: Spain
- Autonomous community: Asturias
- Province: Asturias
- Comarca: Oviedo
- Judicial district: Oviedo
- Capital: Villanueva (Santo Adriano)

Government
  - Alcalde: Carlos de Llanos González (PSOE)

Area
  - Total: 22.60 km^{2} (8.73 sq mi)
- Highest elevation: 813 m (2,667 ft)

Population (2025-01-01)
  - Total: 281
  - Density: 12.4/km^{2} (32.2/sq mi)
- Time zone: UTC+1 (CET)
  - Summer (DST): UTC+2 (CEST)
- Postal code: 33115
- Website: Official website

Santo Adriano is a municipality in the Autonomous Community of the Principality of Asturias. It is bordered on the north by Oviedo, on the east by Ribera de Arriba and Morcín, on the south by Quirós and Proaza and on the west by Proaza and Grado.

== Geography ==
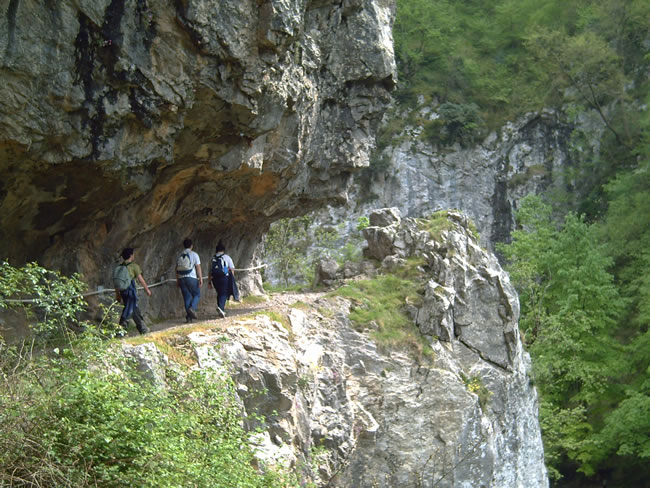
Las Xanas Pass

It is one of the smaller municipalities in Asturias in both area and population. Like the majority of the rural areas in Asturias, the population is receding.

The highest point in the municipality is Grandamiana, at 813 m. Afterwards are Los Navalones at 756 and El Piantón at 750. Fifty-eight percent of the municipal area is between 400 and 800 meters high. Nearly a quarter of the area has a slope of more than 50%. The lowest point is along the Trubia River, at 140 meters.

In addition to the Trubia, which crosses the territory from south to north, there are many small arroyos which flow into it, such as the Picarós, the Rebregáu, the Tresarcu and the Xanas. The latter flows along the Xanas Pass, which is one of the more beautiful sights in the area.

=== Parishes ===
- Castañedo del Monte (Asturian: Castañeu'l Monte)
- Lavares (Asturian: Llavares)
- Tuñón
- Villanueva (Asturian: Villanuova)

== Demographics ==
The municipality reached its highest population in the year 1900, with 1,747 inhabitants. Since then, the loss of population has been notable, as is the case in most Asturian mountain municipalities. The large part of the movement is due to the migration of many inhabitants to Oviedo, especially for working in the arms factory in Trubia parish. Currently (as of the 2005 census), the majority of the population is over 40 years in age and there is little generational replacement, which causes the municipality to be the third smallest in Asturias in population.

Reference: INE

== Economy ==
The principal economic activity of the municipality is ranching, especially with cattle. The most common breed of cattle is the Asturiana de los Valles, which is bred for meat. Agriculture is generally practiced for subsistence.

The industrial sector is practically zero, as the proximity of the arms factory in Trubia takes nearly all the workers. In contrast, the service sector employs 56% of the employed population, and has experienced growth in recent years due to activities related to the natural surroundings and its associated business.

== Politics ==
Party	Votes	Percentage	Seats
PSOE	182	80.89%	6
PP	33	14.67%	1
IU-BA	2	0.89%	0
PAS	1	0.44%	0

In the last municipal elections (2003), the municipality voted in an absolute majority for the Spanish Socialist Workers' Party, and elected Carlos de Llanos González as mayor.

== Famous people ==
- Laureano Fernández Vázquez (1933 - June 13, 2004) was a businessman born in Tuñón. Among his best-known achievements are that of completing Las Salesas complex in Oviedo, a combination of apartments and local businesses inaugurated on October 20, 1982. He later received the first international prize of commercial centers, given in Monaco.
- Daniel Albuerne (November 7, 1879 - March 7, 1912) was a writer born in Santo Adriano de Villanueva. Although he began a religious career, he quickly abandoned it and received degrees at Minas. He worked in Madrid newspapers such as El Correo Español and Patria y Letras, and those of Oviedo such as El Correo de Asturias and La Opinión. He also collaborated in Latin American publications, both in Spanish and Asturian.
- Gutierre de Tuñón, or García de Tuñón, was a 16th-century seaman, who was one of the four Asturians who joined Magellan on the expedition which discovered the Magellan Strait. The expedition crossed over half of the world, visiting the coast of South America, and crossed much of the Pacific Ocean and discovering the Bismarck Islands, the Marshall Islands, and other archipelagoes, and was one of the first to explore New Guinea, which was discovered in 1525 by the Portuguese Jorge de Meneses.

== Art ==
The most notable building in the municipality is the temple of Santo Adriano de Tuñón, which was ordered built by Alfonso III of Asturias and his wife the queen Jimena in 891. The church is dedicated to the martyrs Adriano and his wife Natalia. It was restored in 1108 and 1949, and was declared a National Historical Monument in 1931.

It is in a basilica plan, divided into three naves which are connected by arches, with a large portico in one large room. On the opposite side is a cemetery. The construction techniques include masonry and ashlar.

The other notable structure is the "Roman" bridge across the Trubia River, which dates from the medieval period. It consists of a 1.5-m-high arch and is 4 meters wide between railings.

== See also ==
- List of municipalities in Asturias
