= Simpsonville Methodist Church =

Historic church in Kentucky, United States

- U.S. National Register of Historic Places
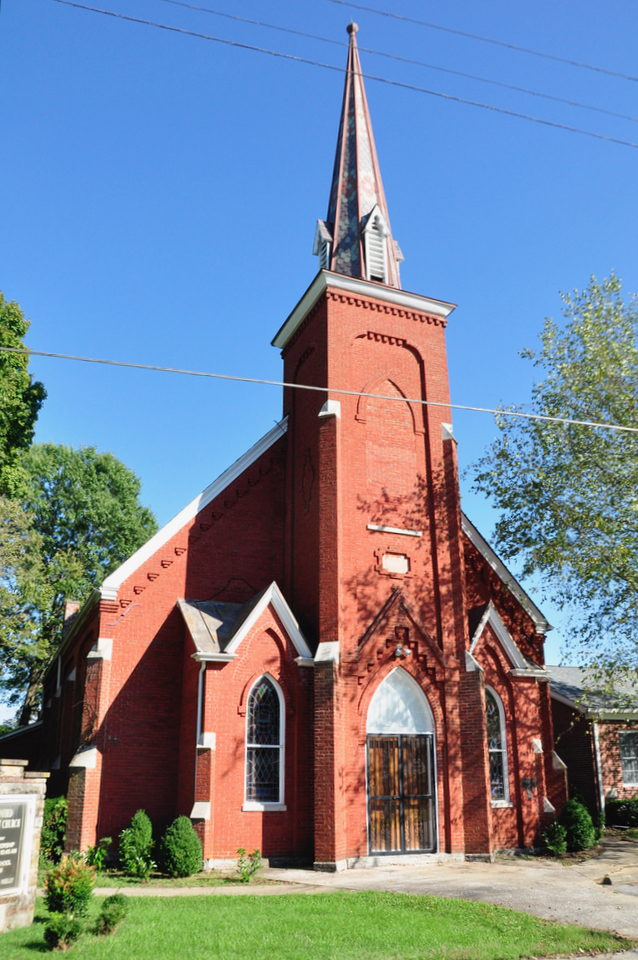

- Location within Kentucky Location within the United States
- Location: First St., Simpsonville, Kentucky
- Coordinates: 38°13′30″N 85°21′17″W
- Area: 0.4 acres (0.16 ha)
- Built: 1876
- Architectural style: Gothic
- MPS: Shelby County MRA
- NRHP reference No.: 88002879
- Added to NRHP: December 27, 1988

The Simpsonville Methodist Church is a historic church on First Street in Simpsonville, Kentucky. It was built in 1876 and added to the National Register in 1988.

The first church on this location was built in 1840; it had elevated pews and 32 members in 1842. This church was built in 1876 as the Methodist Episcopal Church South for cost of $7500. It had 210 members during 1877–1880.

== See also ==
- Simpsonville Christian Church, also NRHP-listed
