= Sostra =

Ancient Roman fort and settlement

- Location within Bulgaria
- 42.984871°N 24.673132°E

Sostra is an ancient Roman fort and settlement near the village of Lomets, Bulgaria.

Impressive remains have been excavated and partially restored.

Sostra was strategically situated along the major Roman road (the Via Traiana) linking ancient Philippopolis (today's Plovdiv) and Diocletianopolis in the Roman province of Thrace with the Roman outposts on the Limes Moesiae on the Danube such as Ulpia Oescus (near today's Gigen) and Novae (near today's Shishtov) via the Troyan Pass in the Balkan Mountains.

The road was vital in Trajan's Dacian Wars against the Thracian tribes north of the Danube, and later became more important as a main artery of the province.

The museum in Troyan contains several finds from the site.

== History ==
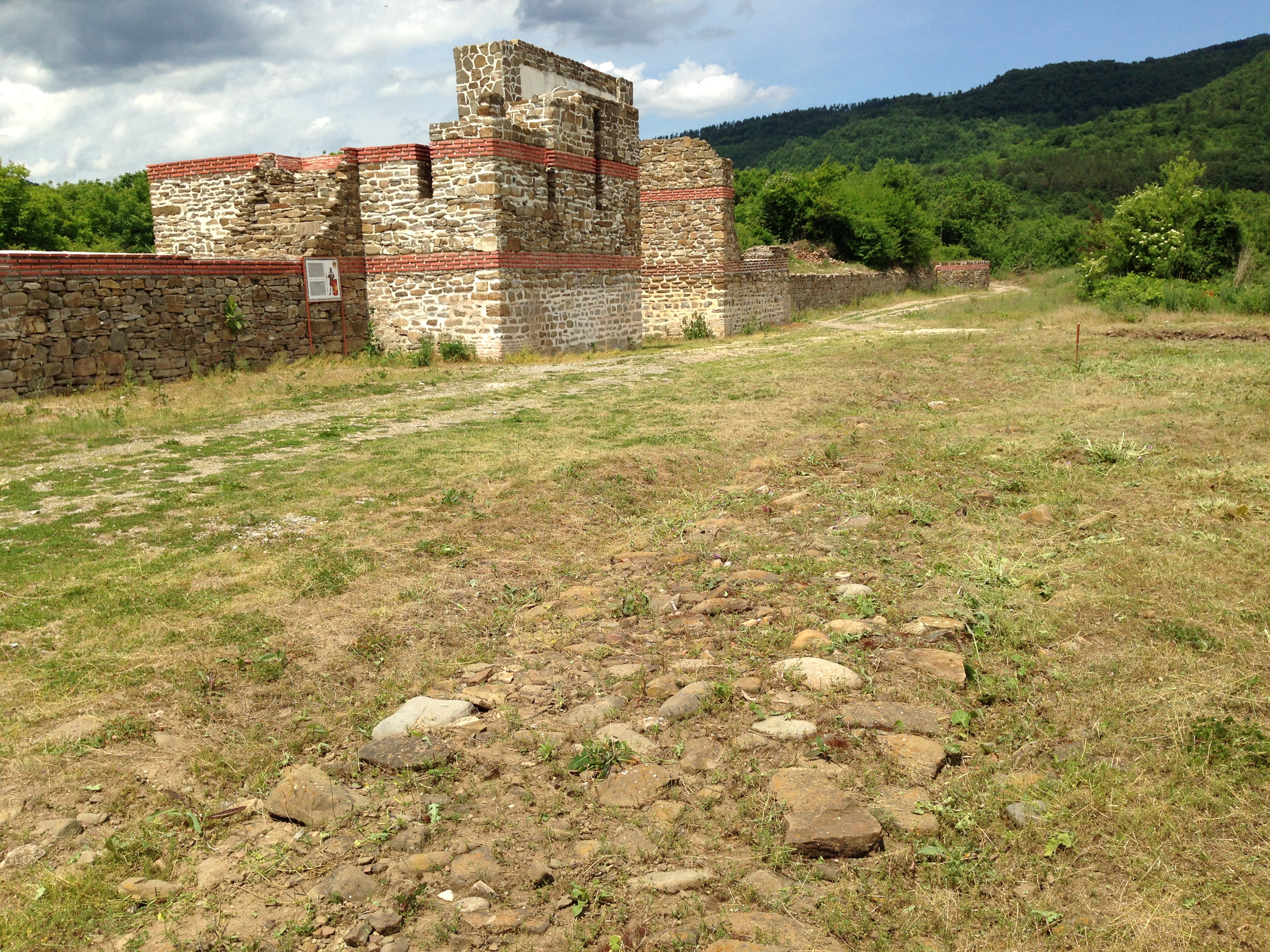
later fort and foundation of original fort wall from 147 AD

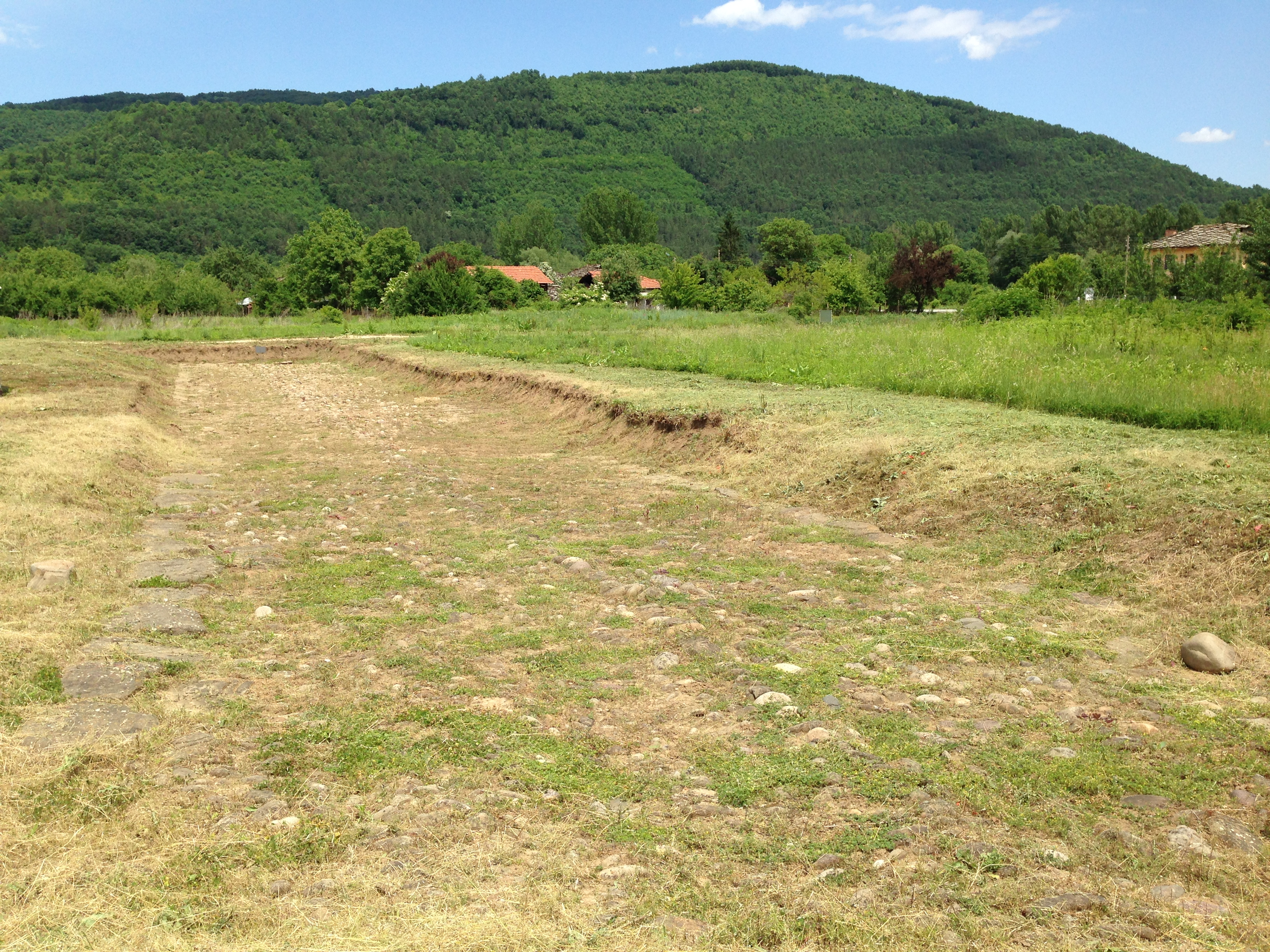
Via Traiana at Sostra

The site was first settled based on a mansio or road station from around 100 AD. Sostra fort was built around 147 AD at the order of Roman Emperor Antoninus Pius. The cohort II Mattiacorum of around 1000 soldiers (milliaria) was stationed here according to a statue base found in the principia, after being based at Sexaginta Prista (present-day Ruse) until 145 AD. The settlement (or vicus) to the west and east of the fort gradually grew into a town with a civilian population.

In 175 the road was improved under Marcus Aurelius, according to milestone inscriptions, leading to increased passing traffic and trade. It became a paved dual-width carriageway allowing two-way traffic.

From 235 another cohort (I Cisipadensium) was stationed here, consisting of nominally 500 men. The fort became the target of barbarian invasions and in 249 was captured by the Goths. In 254 another cohort was stationed here by emperor Gallienus and began building a new fort wall which continued till at least 282 under Claudius Gothicus, Aurelian and Probus.

In 378 the fort was again burnt down by the Goths, but in the late 4th century the Christian basilica of St. George was built in the town. In the early 5th century eastern "barbarians" settled in Sostra and the nearby old Thracian strongholds in the mountains were restored.

It was completely destroyed by the Huns at the end of the 5th century.

== Archaeology ==
The Roman site extends over about 6 km^{2}.

The original fort of 147 AD had no bastions and the walls were rounded at the corners. The rebuilt fort from 254 AD was placed inside the original walls and conformed to later Roman norms with many bastions for better defence.

Recently a large Roman road station (mansio) near the fort has been excavated which covers an area of 500 sq.m with walls up to 2 m high. It is described as a luxury complex resembling a modern-day spa resort and dating from 100 AD; it has also been described as a praetorium because it was a meeting place for VIP visitors. In addition to Roman thermae there was a large indoor swimming pool next to a heated jacuzzi. Other swimming pools have also been discovered some with holes in the floor possibly for upwelling hot springs.

Sostra was excavated in 2002–2016 by Ivan Hristov of the Bulgarian National Museum of History.

== Sources ==
- Ivan Hristov: SOSTRA, Roman Castellum, Road-side Station and Settlements on the Road Oescus (Ulpia Oescus) – Philippopolis 2nd-5th c., THRACIAN, GREEK, ROMAN AND MEDIEVAL CITIES, RESIDENCES AND FORTRESSES IN BULGARIA, Editor RUMEN IVANOV. ISBN 978-619-90503-0-9
