= Temple of Augustus and Livia =

Roman temple located in Isère, France

Coordinates: 45°31′32″N 4°52′27″E

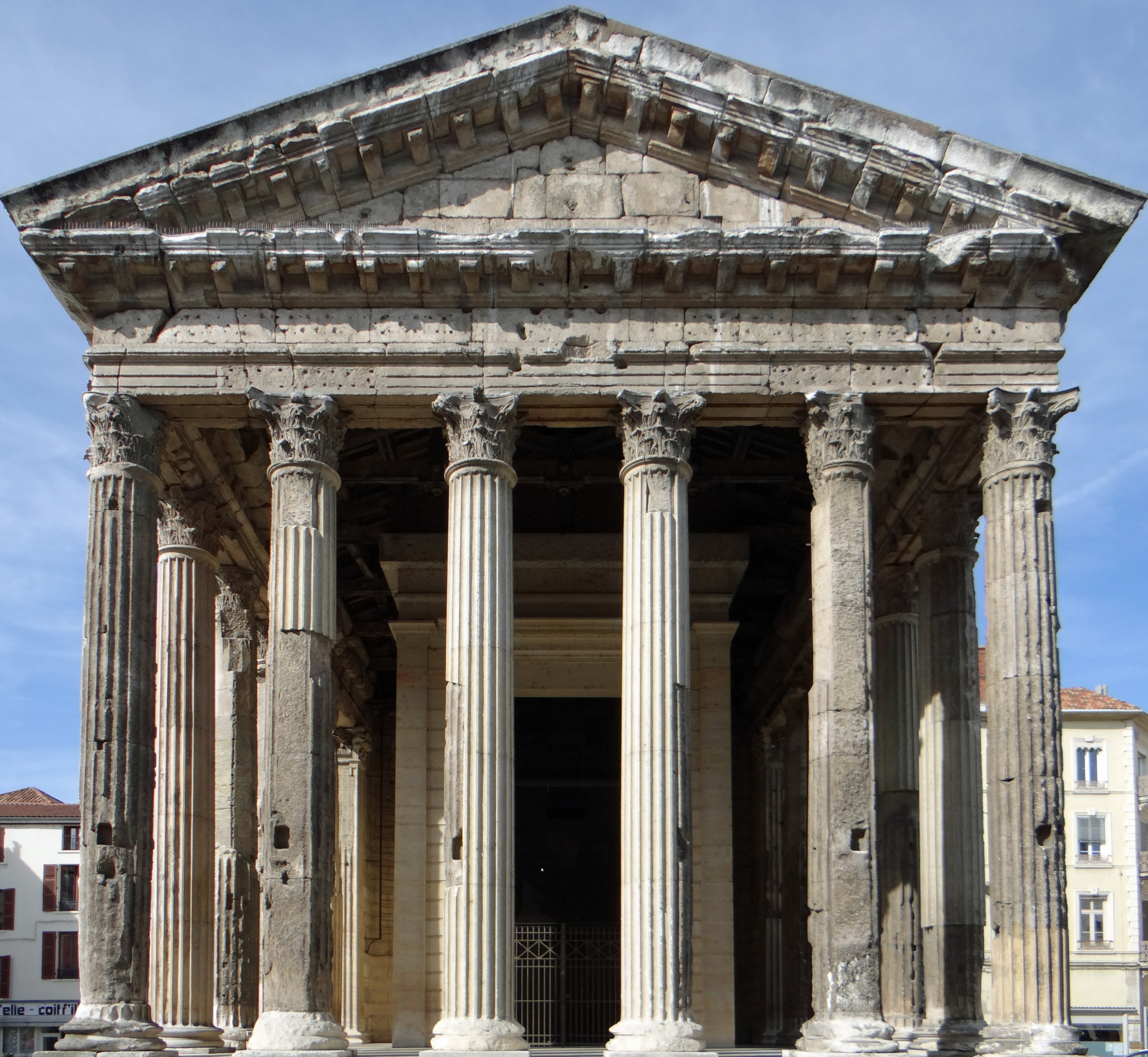
Front view of the Temple

The Temple of Augustus and Livia is a Roman peripteral sine postico (Note: sine postico is a term used by Vitruvius for a temple peripteral on three sides only, with a plain back wall.) hexastyle Corinthian temple built at the beginning of the 1st century, which was in the center of the ancient city of Vienne, also corresponding to the center of the modern city, in the French department of Isère and the region of Auvergne-Rhône-Alpes.

== Ancient history ==
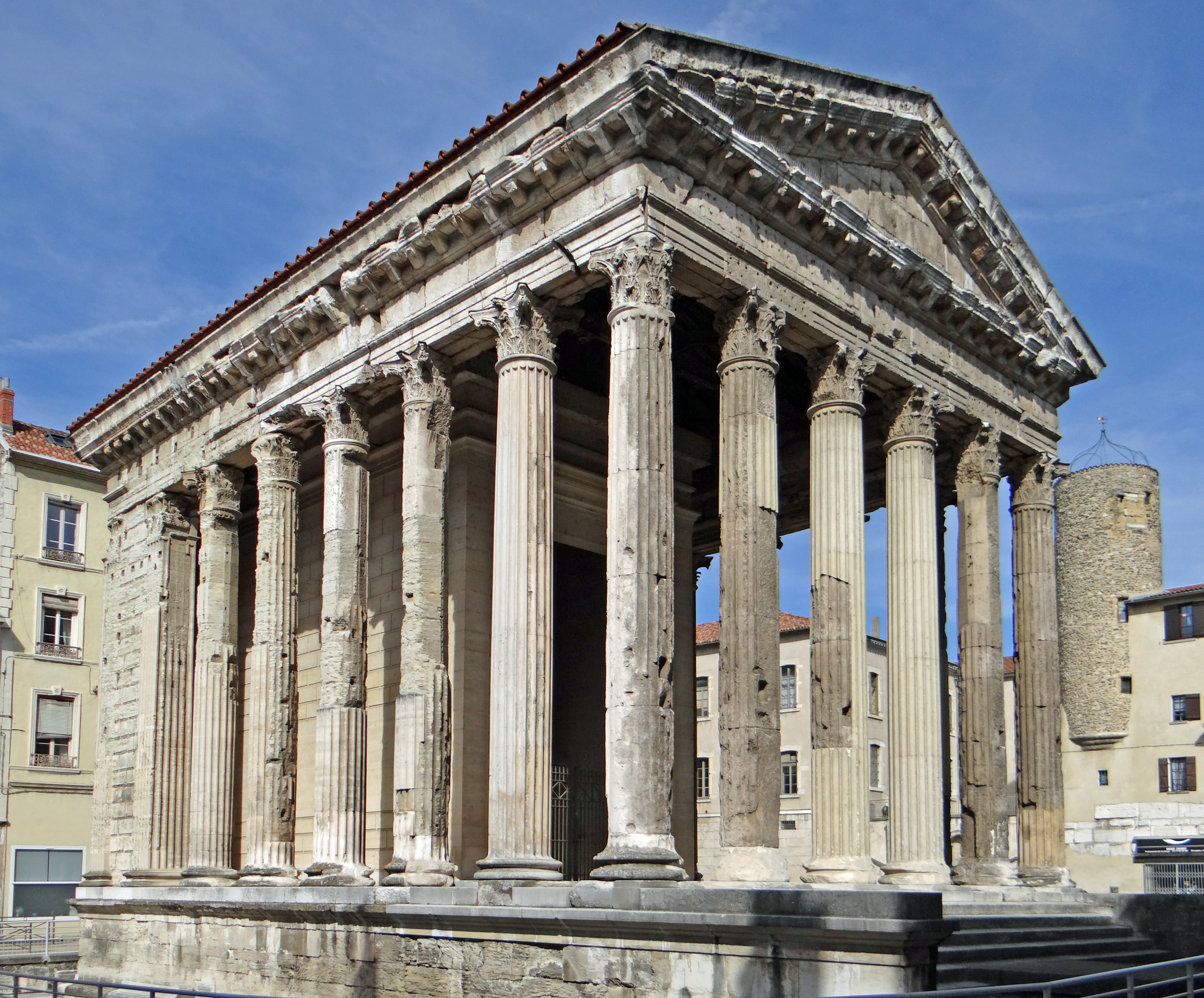
Temple of Augustus and Livia

During its construction, the temple was dedicated to the imperial cult, to honor the Emperor Augustus and his wife Livia. It has two states of construction. Of the original building built in southern stone, only the rear part remains: large wall to the west, corner pilasters, returns with pilasters and columns. The first state is dated last quarter of the 1st century BC. AD, by comparison with the Maison Carrée in Nîmes, the Roman temple of Château-Bas in Vernègues, and other buildings in Narbonnaise. Most of the building is rebuilt in Seyssel stones and choin. According to specialists of ancient ornamentation, the more naturally treated capitals were carved around the middle of 1st century, which corresponds to the first uses of choin in the city. Partial reconstruction would therefore take place a few decades after construction. However, one cannot imagine that such a building intended to honor Augustus has remained unfinished for so long. The building must therefore have suffered a fire (traces of which can be seen on the rear part and on the podium), or a slight earthquake which caused the collapse of the eastern part of the building (this assertion is disputed by the scientific community ), the rear part having resisted better due to the presence of the cella and the west wall. This reconstruction undoubtedly took place before Livia was deified in 42 because the initial inscription was put back on the frieze of the new pediment and then that of Livia was added to the architrave.

== Modern history ==
With the Fall of the Western Roman Empire and the Christianization of Gaul, the temple became the parish church of Sainte-Marie-la-Vieille then Notre-Dame-de-la-Vie until the French Revolution. From 1792, the church became the temple of Reason, then the commercial court of Vienne, then the museum and the library of Vienne (until 1852), and finally, after 28 years of work, the building regained its original aspect of Roman temple. Today the temple is the subject of a classification under the historical monuments by the List of 1840.

== Gallery ==
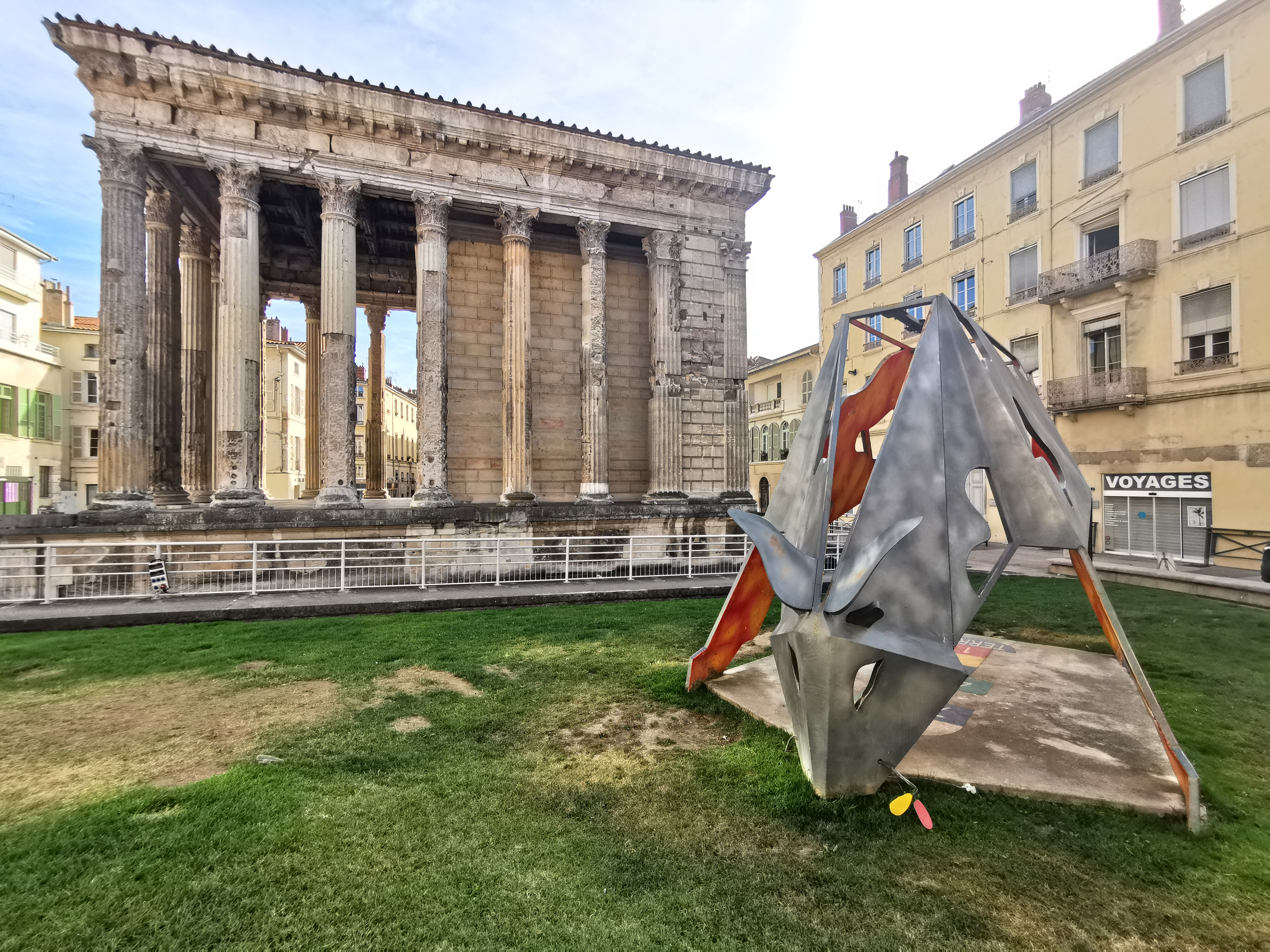
view from the North

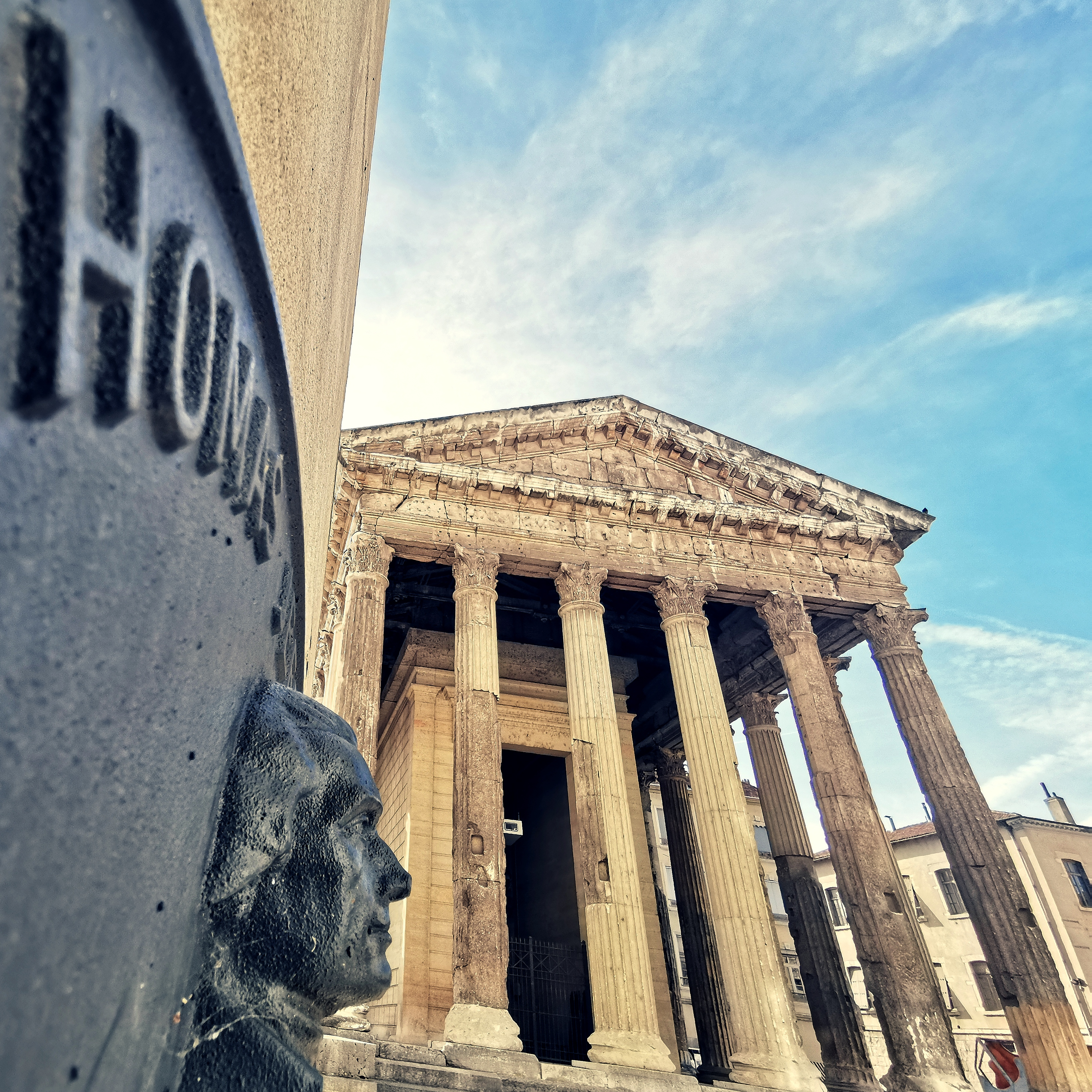
Thomas Jefferson visited the temple in March 1787.
