= Chapel of San Jacinto =

Roman Catholic chapel in Salcajá, Guatemala

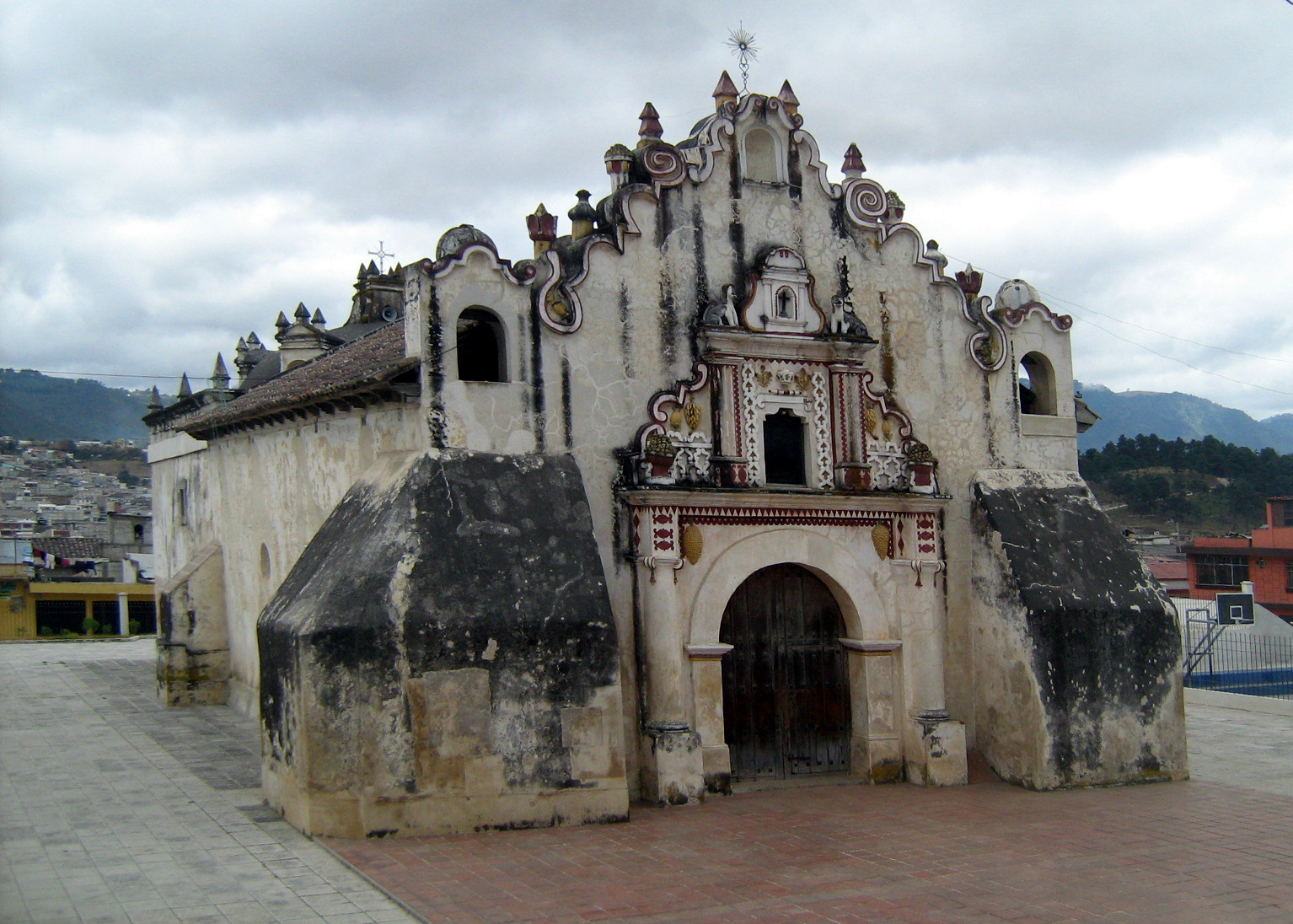
- Chapel of San Jacinto, 2007

Religion
- Affiliation: Roman Catholic
- Province: Los Altos, Quetzaltenango-Totonicapán
- Ecclesiastical or organisational status: Church
- Year consecrated: 1524

Location
- Location: Salcajá, Quetzaltenango
- Municipality: Salcajá
- Interactive map of Chapel of San Jacinto
- Territory: Archdiocese of Los Altos, Quetzaltenango-Totonicapán
- Coordinates: 14°52′53″N 91°27′34″W

The Chapel of San Jacinto (Spanish: Capilla de San Jacinto), formal name Ermita La Conquistadora de la Inmaculada Concepción, is a Roman Catholic chapel located in the town of Salcajá, Guatemala. It is said to have been founded by the Franciscans in 1524, the same year the Maya K'iche' kingdom was conquered by the Spanish conquistadores, and is claimed to be the first church built in Central America. Although there is no historical evidence to support that claim, the chapel can be considered a fine example of early Spanish colonial architecture.
