= Tuñón =

Parish in Asturias, Spain

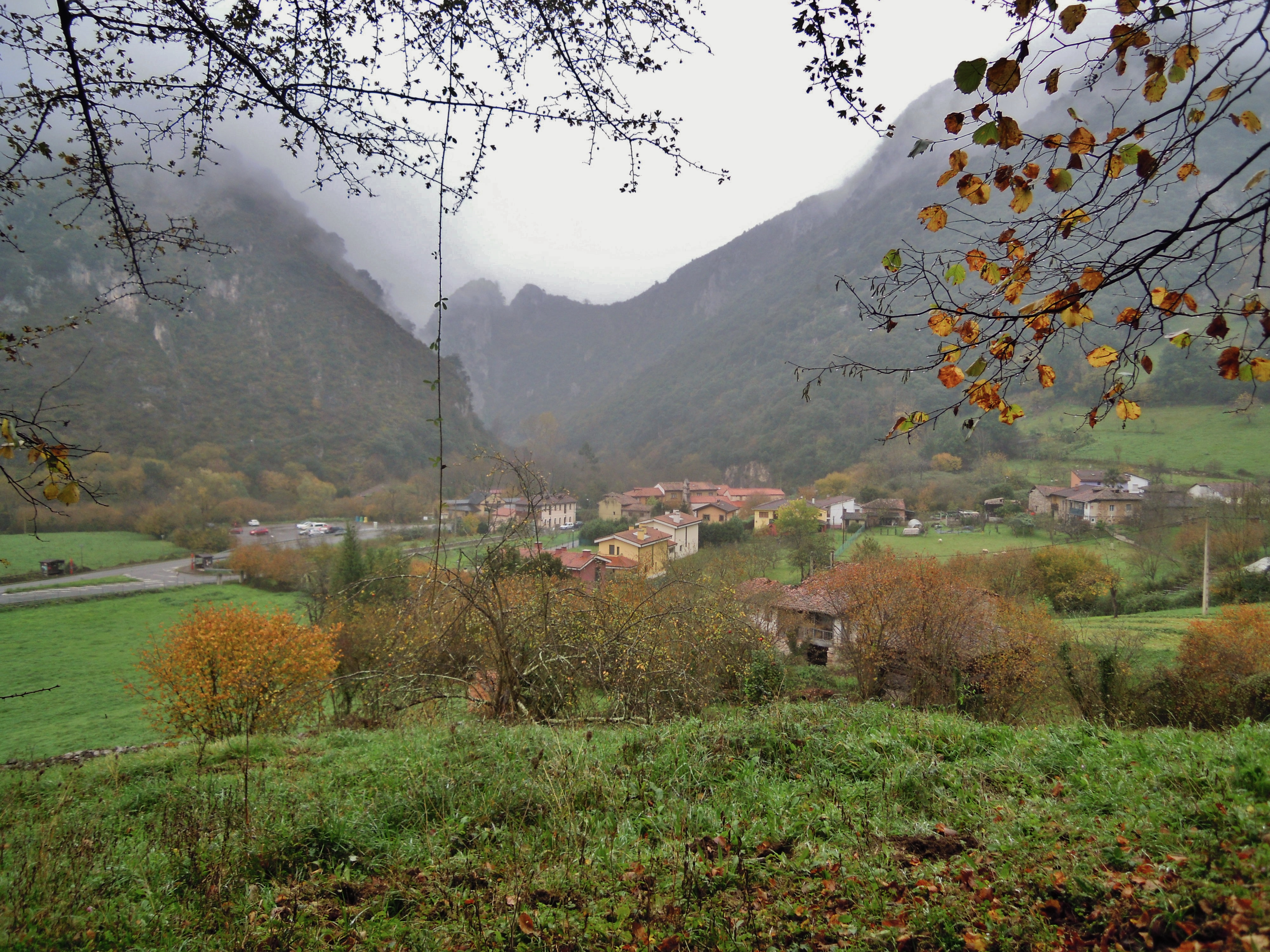
The landscape of Tuñón.

Tuñón (43.28333°N 5.966667°W) is a parish in Santo Adriano, a municipality within the province and autonomous community of Asturias, in northern Spain.

It is 11.29 km^{2} (4.36 sq mi) in size. The population is 76 (2006). The postal code is 33115.

This parish has several villages:

- Busecu
- Dosango
- La Casina
- La Collecha
- La Rodada
- La Veiga'l Rei
- Las Curuxas
- Les Carangues
- Peñoba
- Sabadía
- Tenebreo
- Tuñón

Feast days include:

- Feast of the Martyrs, dedicated to St. Fabian and St. Sebastian, 20 January
- San Antonio, 13 June
