= Gobiendes =

- Parish
- Location within Spain
- Coordinates: 43.466667°N 5.233333°W
- Country: Spain
- Autonomous community: Asturias
- Province: Asturias
- Municipality: Colunga

Gobiendes is one of 13 parishes (administrative divisions) in the Colunga municipality, within the province and autonomous community of Asturias, in northern Spain.

The population is 295 (INE 2007).

== Villages ==
- Coceña
- Gobiendes
- Lloroñi
