= Veliki Preslav =

Veliki Preslav Велики Преслав
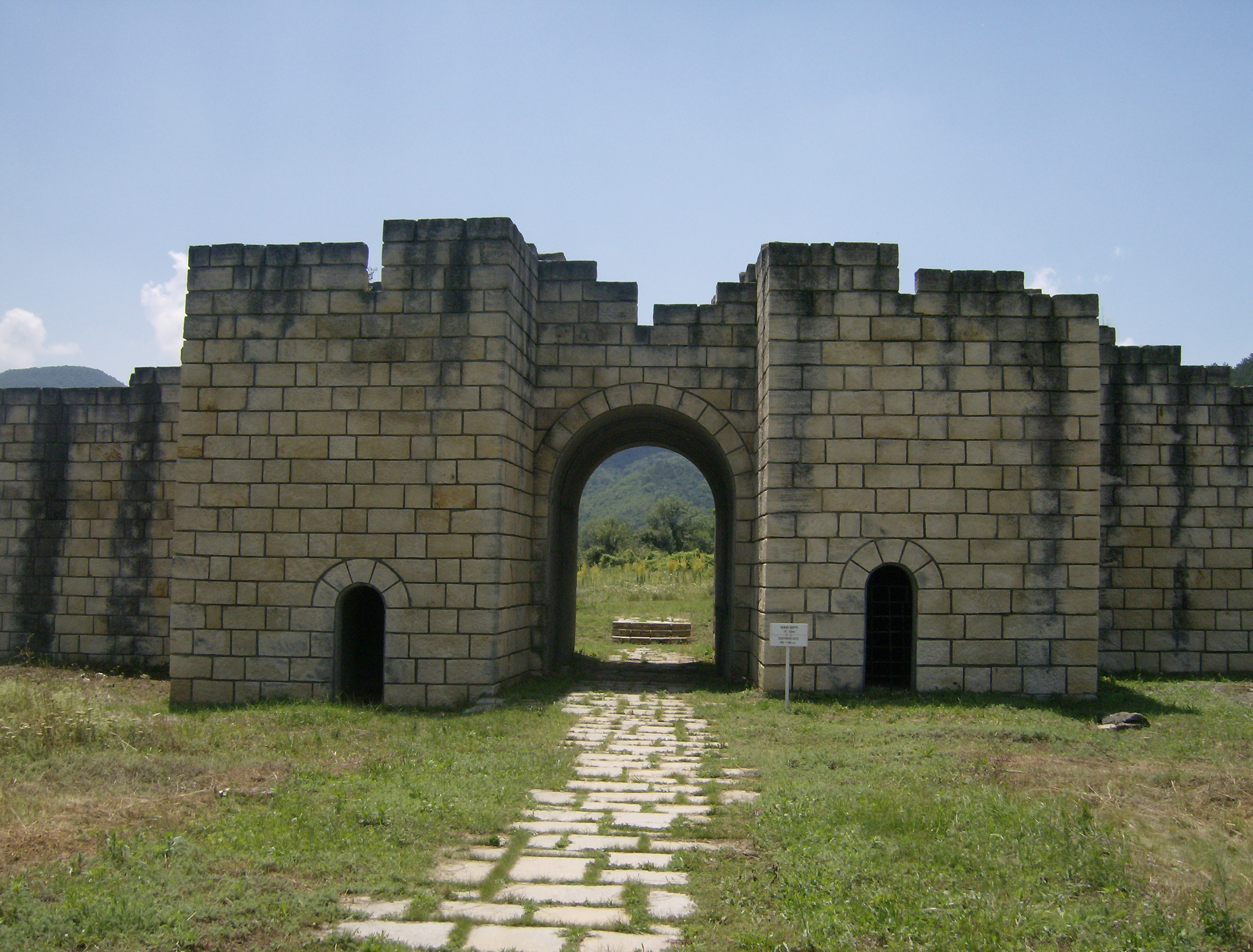

- Location of Veliki Preslav, Bulgaria
- Coordinates: 43°10′0″N 26°49′1.2″E
- Country: Bulgaria
- Province (Oblast): Shumen
- Elevation: 92 m (302 ft)

Population (2009-12-31)
  - City: 8,951
  - Urban: 14,960
- Time zone: UTC+2 (EET)
  - Summer (DST): UTC+3 (EEST)
- Postal Code: 9850
- Area code: 0538

The modern Veliki Preslav or Great Preslav (Bulgarian: Велики Преслав, pronounced [vɛˈliki prɛˈsɫaf]), former Preslav (Bulgarian: Преслав; until 1993), is a city and the seat of government of the Veliki Preslav Municipality (Great Preslav Municipality, new Bulgarian: obshtina), which in turn is part of Shumen Province, Bulgaria. Veliki Preslav is situated at an altitude of 132 m (92 m above sea level).

A former village, it assumed the name of the medieval capital in 1878 and became a town in 1883. As of December 2009, it had a population of 8,951.

Preslav was the capital of the First Bulgarian Empire from 893 to 972 and was one of the most important cities in medieval Southeastern Europe. The ruins of the city are situated in modern northeastern Bulgaria, some 20 kilometres southwest of the regional capital of Shumen, and are currently a national archaeological reserve.

== History ==
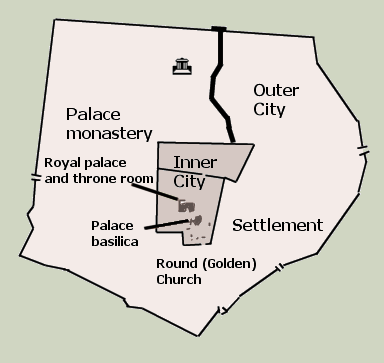
Plan of Preslav

The name of Preslav is of Slavic origin; apparently it was initially founded and functioned as a Slavic settlement until its fortification at the beginning of the ninth century. The proximity to the then Bulgarian capital of Pliska led to the fast development and expansion of Preslav during the reign of the Khans Krum and Omurtag. By the time of the coronation of Archon Boris I in 852, Preslav had turned into an important strategic military centre and was the seat of the Ichirgu-boil. A number of churches were built in the city after the conversion of the Bulgarians to Christianity in 864.

The pagan revolt of the Pliska nobility led by Prince Vladimir in 892 was decisive for the future destiny of the city. In 893 Vladimir was dethroned and during the Council of Preslav Boris I appointed Simeon the Great as his successor and decided to move the capital of the state from the still somewhat pagan Pliska to Preslav. In the following 80 years the city developed rapidly, turning into a centre not only of Bulgarian politics and diplomacy, but also of Slavic culture, literature and fine arts. A chronicler mentioned that it took Simeon 28 years to establish and build up his new capital. Archeological excavations have, however, proved that the city continued to develop also during the 930s and 940s and reached the peak in its growth and magnificence in the middle of the rule of Emperor Peter I of Bulgaria.

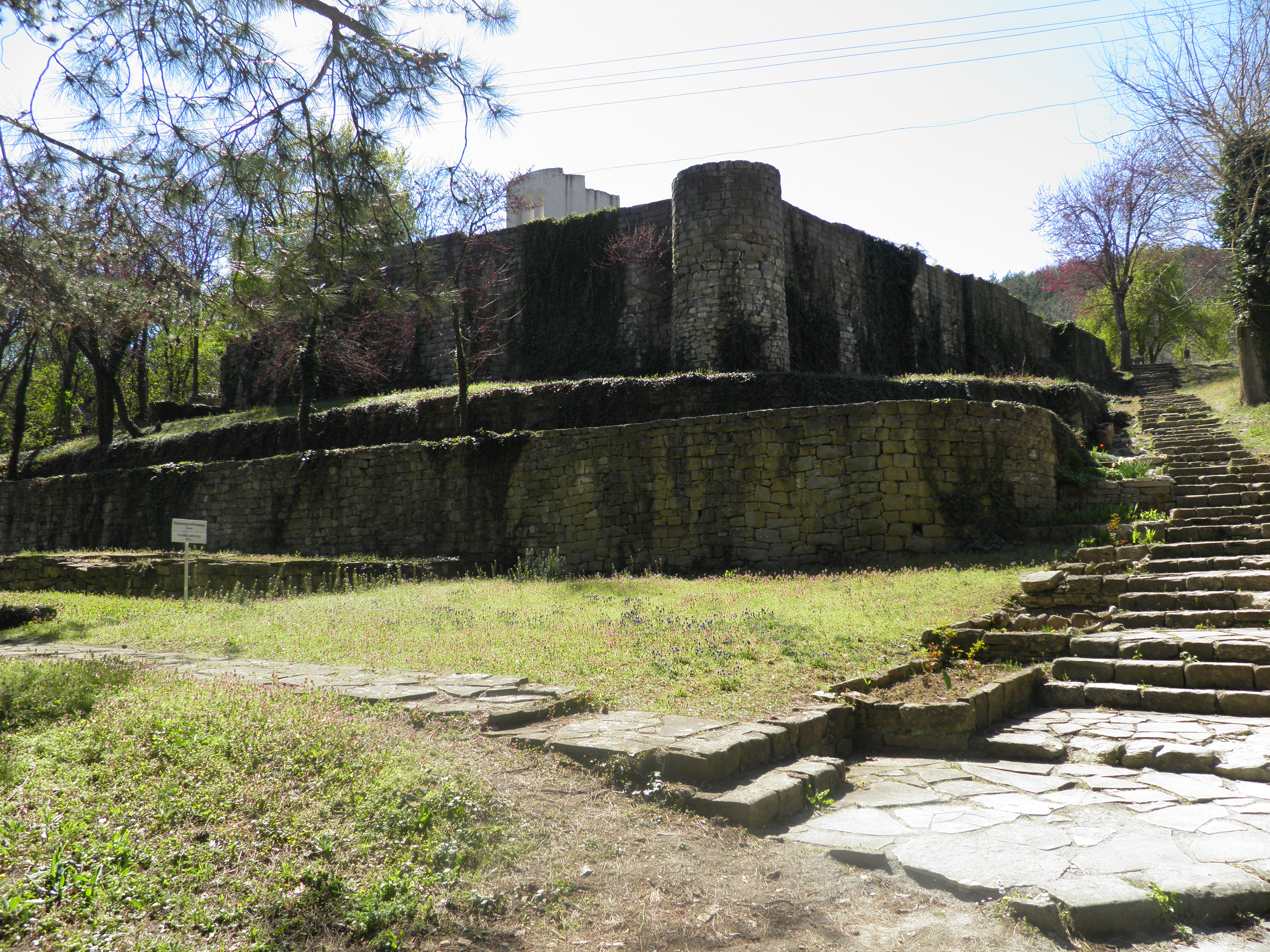
The Round Church, also known as the Golden Church of Veliki Preslav

In view of the impressive town planning, the vital economy and the grandeur of buildings like the Round Church and the Royal Palace, Preslav was a true rival of the largest and most important city centres in the western hemisphere. Culturally, it was the centre of the Preslav Literary School which was founded in Pliska in 886 and was moved to Preslav along with the rest of the court in 893. The greatest Bulgarian writers from the Old Bulgarian period worked in Preslav, among them John Exarch, Constantine of Preslav, Chernorizets Hrabar. It was probably around the Preslav Literary School that the Cyrillic script developed in the tenth century. The city also had large ceramic workshops which produced art ceramics, glazed tiles, as well as ceramic icons and iconostases.

The city's fortune underwent a dramatic downturn at the end of the 960s, when it was occupied by Kievan Prince Sviatoslav. The ensuing war between Rus' and Byzantines left the city burnt and ravaged by the army of Byzantine Emperor John I Tzimisces. The conquerors took away the treasury, the Bulgarian Tsar's regalia and a large part of the library of Simeon. Although Tzimisces renamed the city Ioannoupolis after himself, this name doesn't seem to have caught on in the long term even in Greek, as Anna Komnene mentions Preslav under the hellenised name Megale Peristhlaba in her Alexiad. Although the city did not lose its importance in the next three hundred years, the neighbouring outskirts and the big monasteries became desolate, the economy lost its vitality and significance.

Preslav regained some of its importance in Bulgarian politics during the first years of the joint rule of the founders of the Second Bulgarian Empire, Peter IV of Bulgaria and Ivan Asen I. Apparently, Ivan Asen ruled from the centre of the uprising, Tarnovgrad, whereas his brother and co-ruler Theodore Peter resided in Preslav as a symbol of the renewed statehood of Bulgaria. The strategic advantages of Tarnovgrad were, however, decisive in the long run and the significance of Preslav waned in the course of the 13th century. The Tatar raids during the 1270s drove away the last citizens of Preslav, along with the protothroned bishop of the city. Some of the surviving refugees built up a village of the same name only two kilometres north from the fortress where the contemporary town of Veliki Preslav is now situated.

Preslav Crag on Livingston Island in the South Shetland Islands, Antarctica is named after Preslav.

== Population ==
Veliki Preslav
Year	1887	1910	1934	1946	1956	1965	1975	1985	1992	2001	2005	2009	2011	2021
Population	??	??	??	4,127	5,499	8,143	11,298	10,865	9,969	9,328	9,265	8,951	??	??
	Highest number ?? in ??													
Sources: National Statistical Institute, citypopulation.de, pop-stat.mashke.org, Bulgarian Academy of Sciences

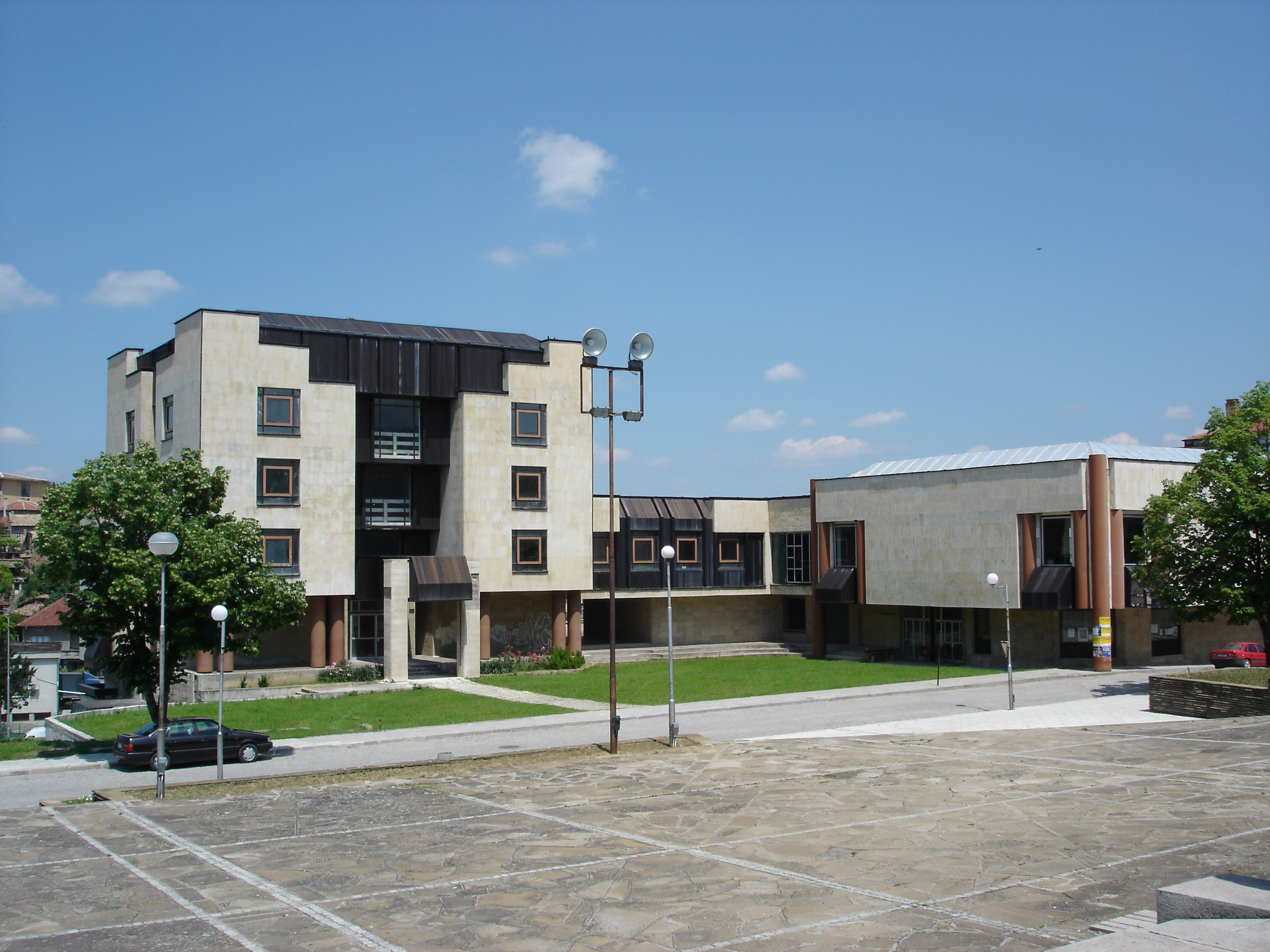
Town Hall

== Education ==
- Simeon Veliki's technical high school
- Farming high school

== Climate ==
Climate data for Veliki Preslav
Month	Jan	Feb	Mar	Apr	May	Jun	Jul	Aug	Sep	Oct	Nov	Dec	Year
Mean daily maximum °C (°F)	5.6 (42.1)	7.8 (46.0)	12.2 (54.0)	18.1 (64.6)	23.7 (74.7)	27.0 (80.6)	30.1 (86.2)	30.2 (86.4)	25.3 (77.5)	19.0 (66.2)	12.2 (54.0)	6.2 (43.2)	18.0 (64.4)
Daily mean °C (°F)	1.3 (34.3)	2.5 (36.5)	7.0 (44.6)	12.6 (54.7)	18.0 (64.4)	21.3 (70.3)	24.1 (75.4)	24.1 (75.4)	20.1 (68.2)	14.0 (57.2)	8.2 (46.8)	2.3 (36.1)	13.0 (55.4)
Mean daily minimum °C (°F)	−1.8 (28.8)	−1.0 (30.2)	2.3 (36.1)	7.1 (44.8)	12.0 (53.6)	15.5 (59.9)	18.0 (64.4)	18.1 (64.6)	14.2 (57.6)	8.8 (47.8)	4.2 (39.6)	0.7 (33.3)	8.0 (46.4)
Source: Weatherbase

== Culture ==
The National Historical and Archaeological Reserve and Museum are located in the town. In 1906 Yordan Gospodinov with the help from K. Shkorpil, established Archaeological Society "Ticha". Every year in the town are conducted May cultural celebrations "Spring in Preslav". Community Center "Razvitie" were established in 1874.

== Sport ==
- FC Preslav

== Gallery ==
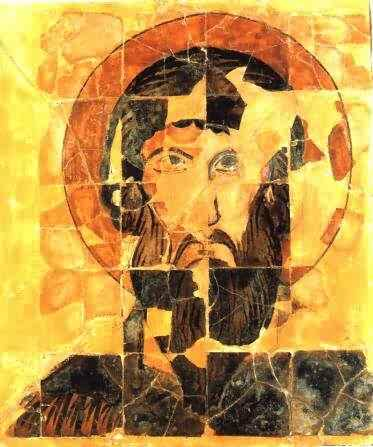
Ceramic icon of St Theodore Stratelates, Preslav, circa 900 AD, National Archaeological Museum, Sofia

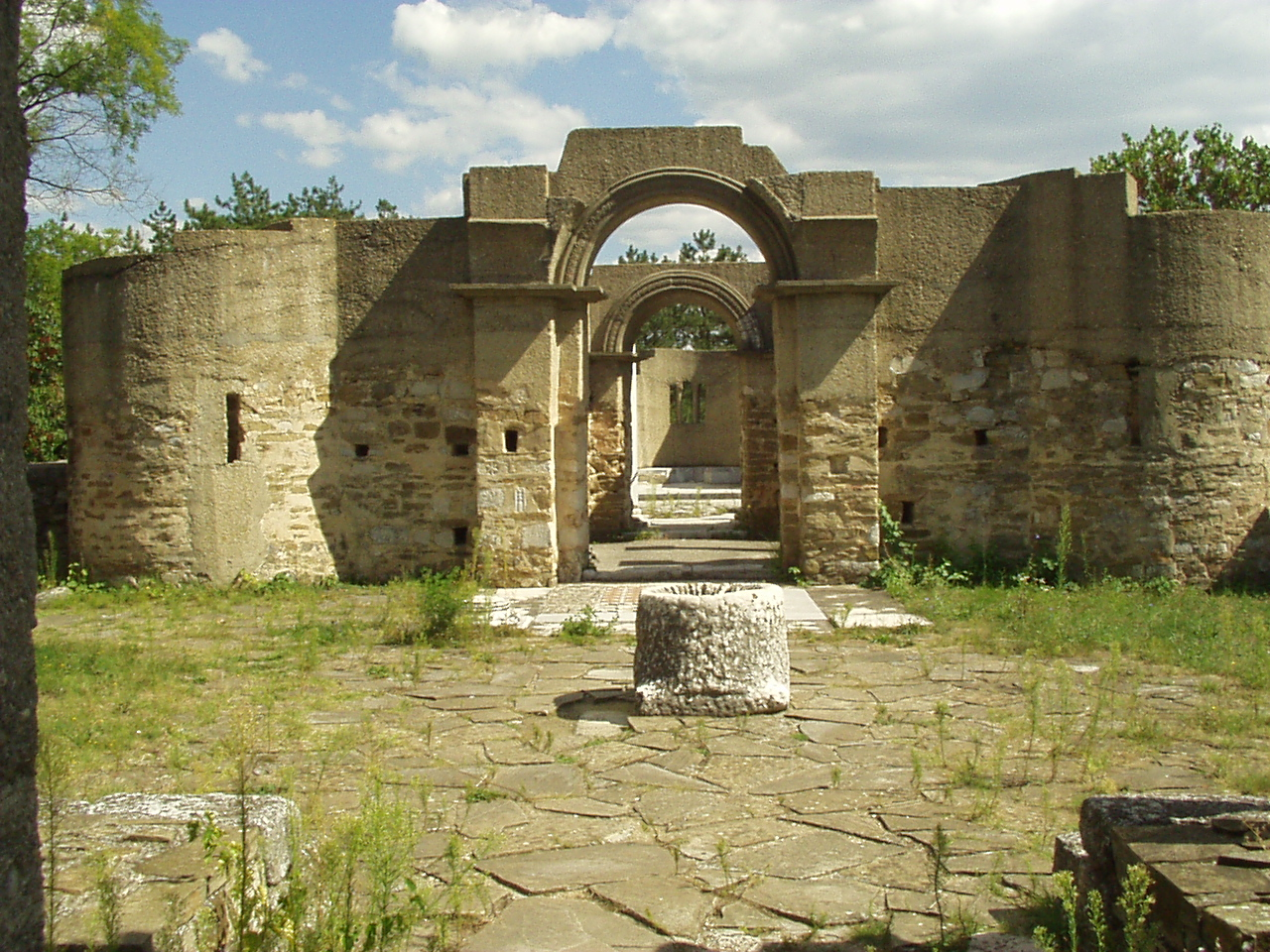
Entrance to the Round (Golden) Church of Veliki Preslav

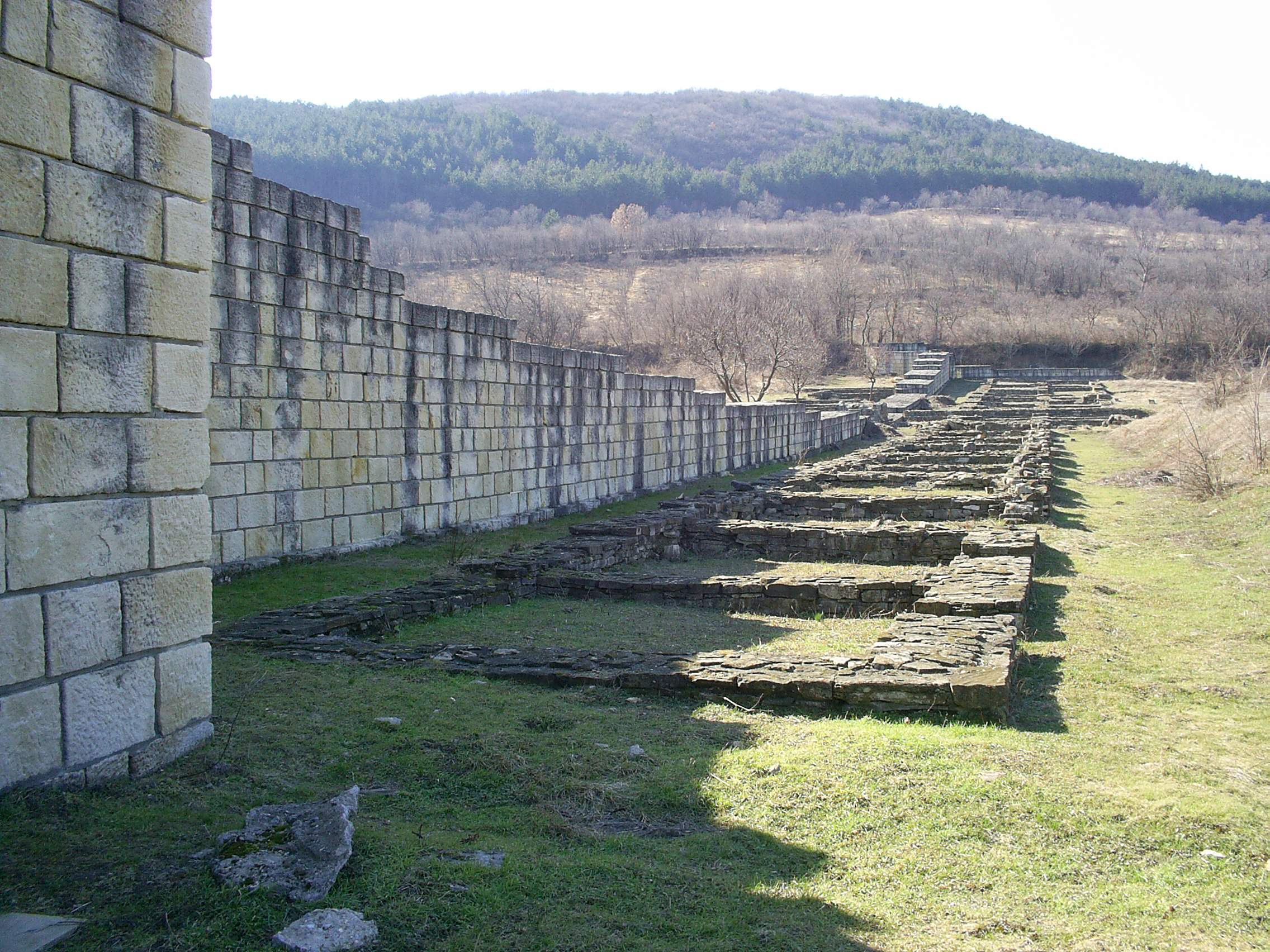
Interior of southern wall of the inner-town of Preslav and ruins of officer's quarters lining the wall

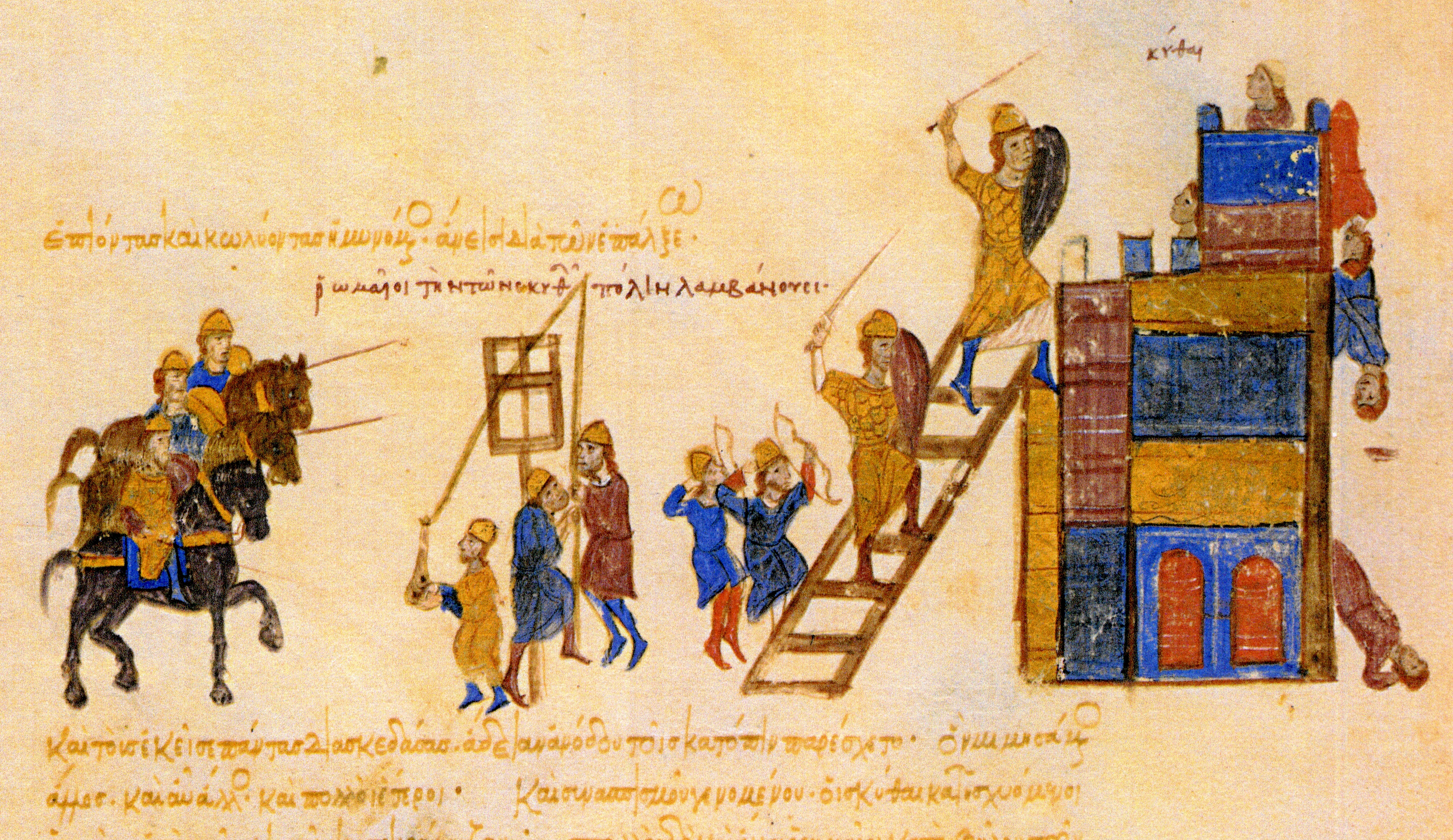
The Byzantines attack Preslav, in a drawing from the 11th century chronicle of John Skylitzes

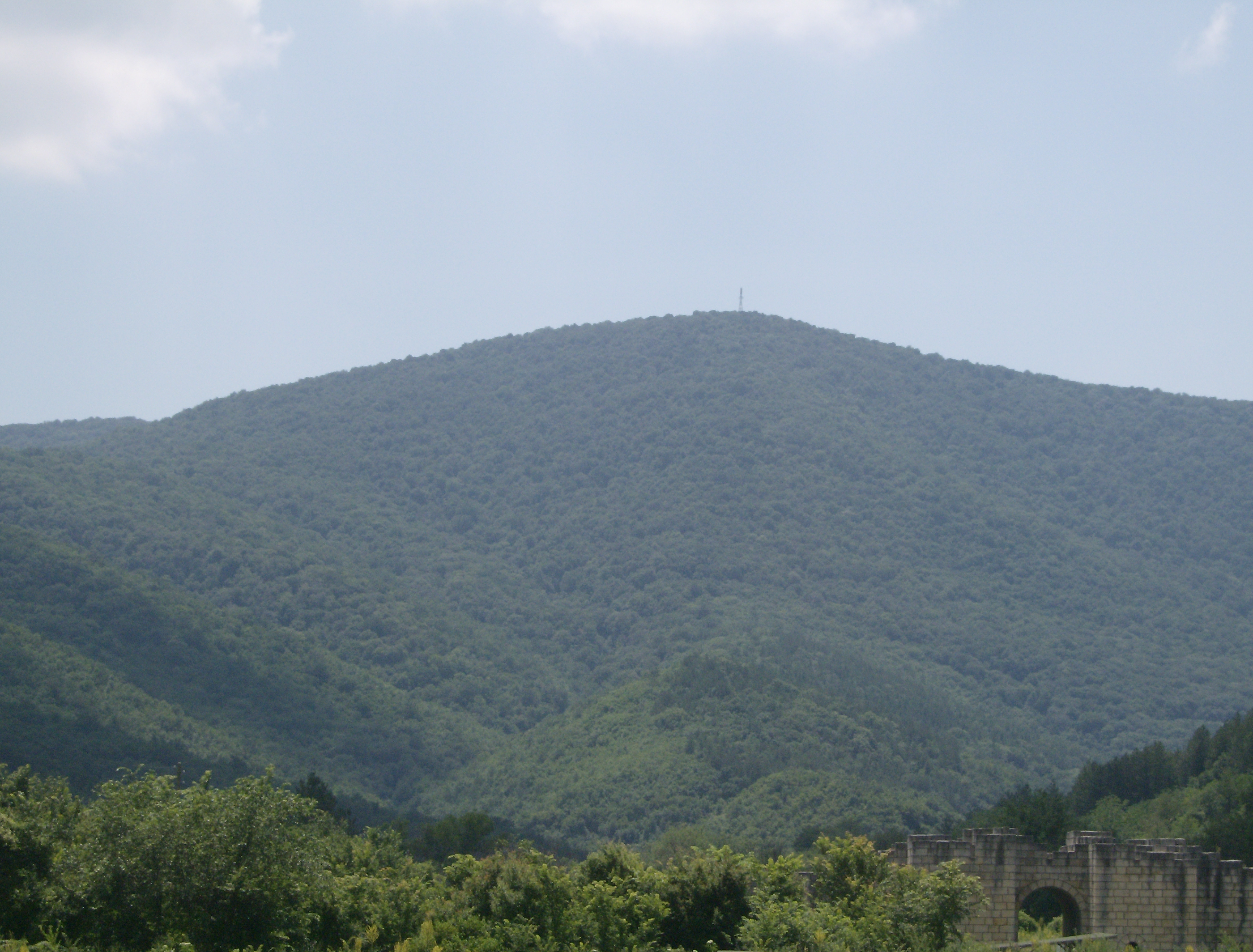

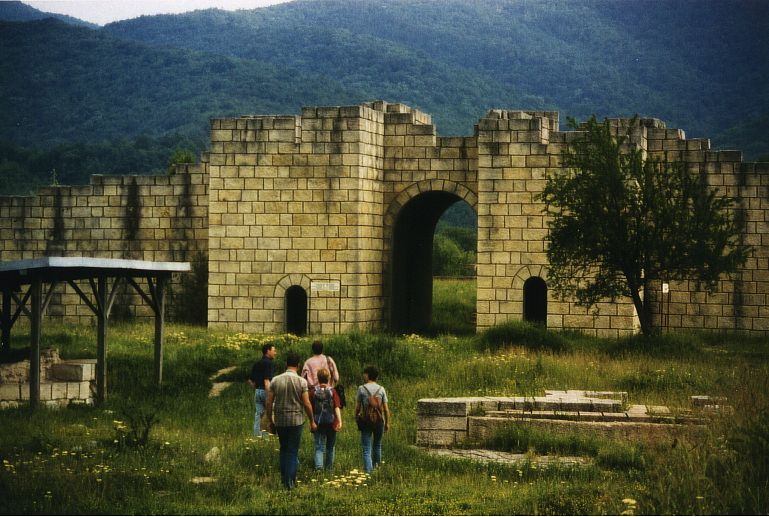

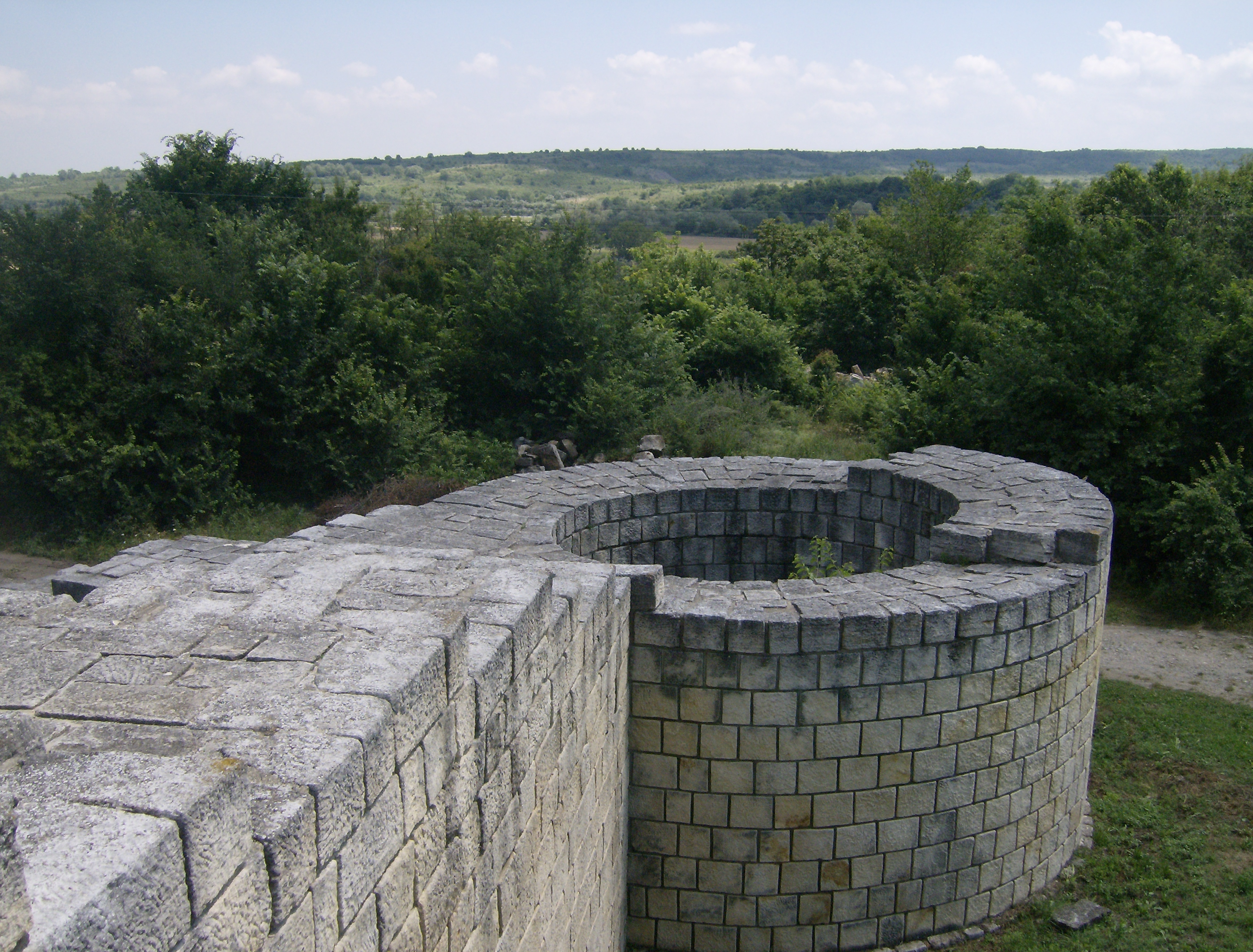

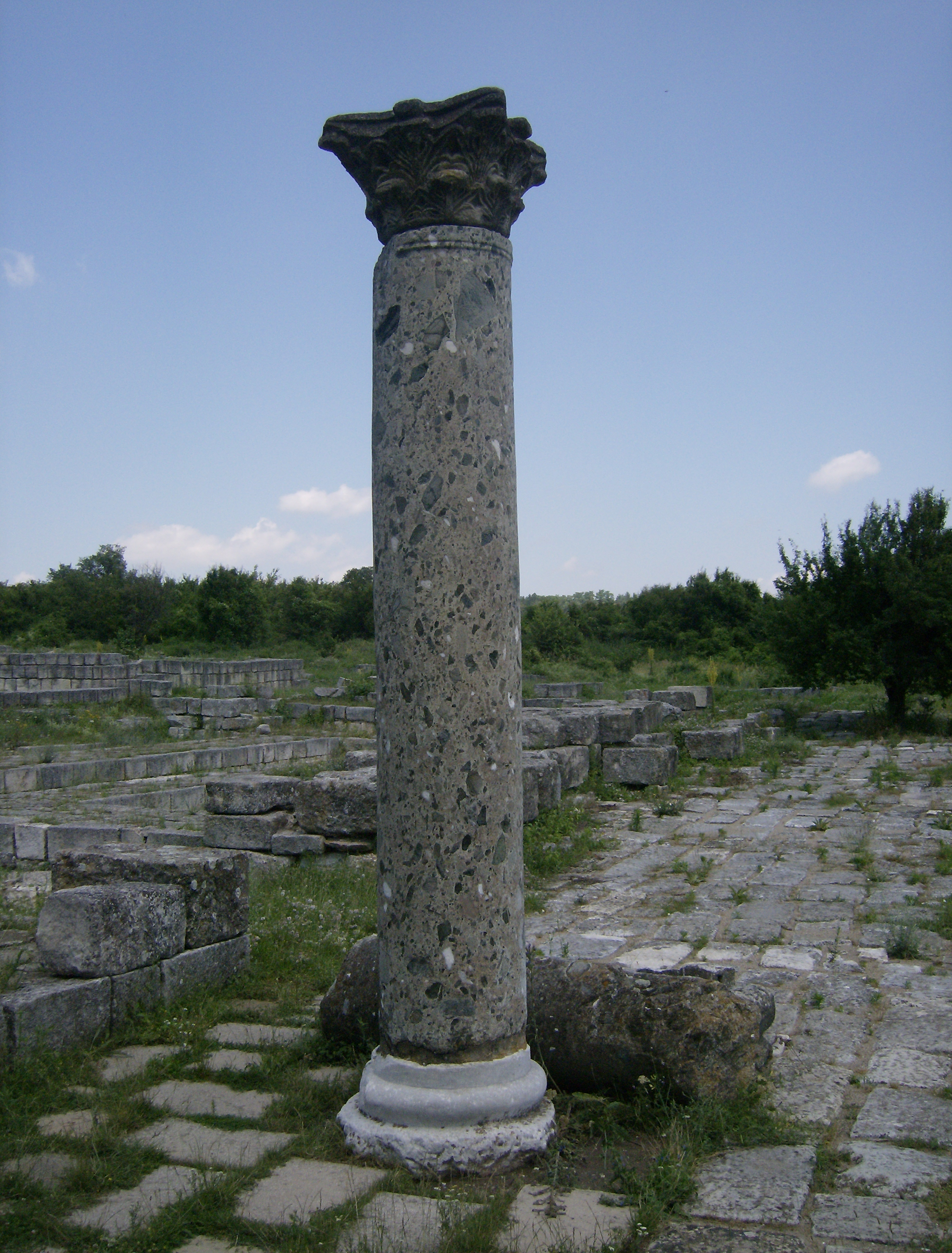

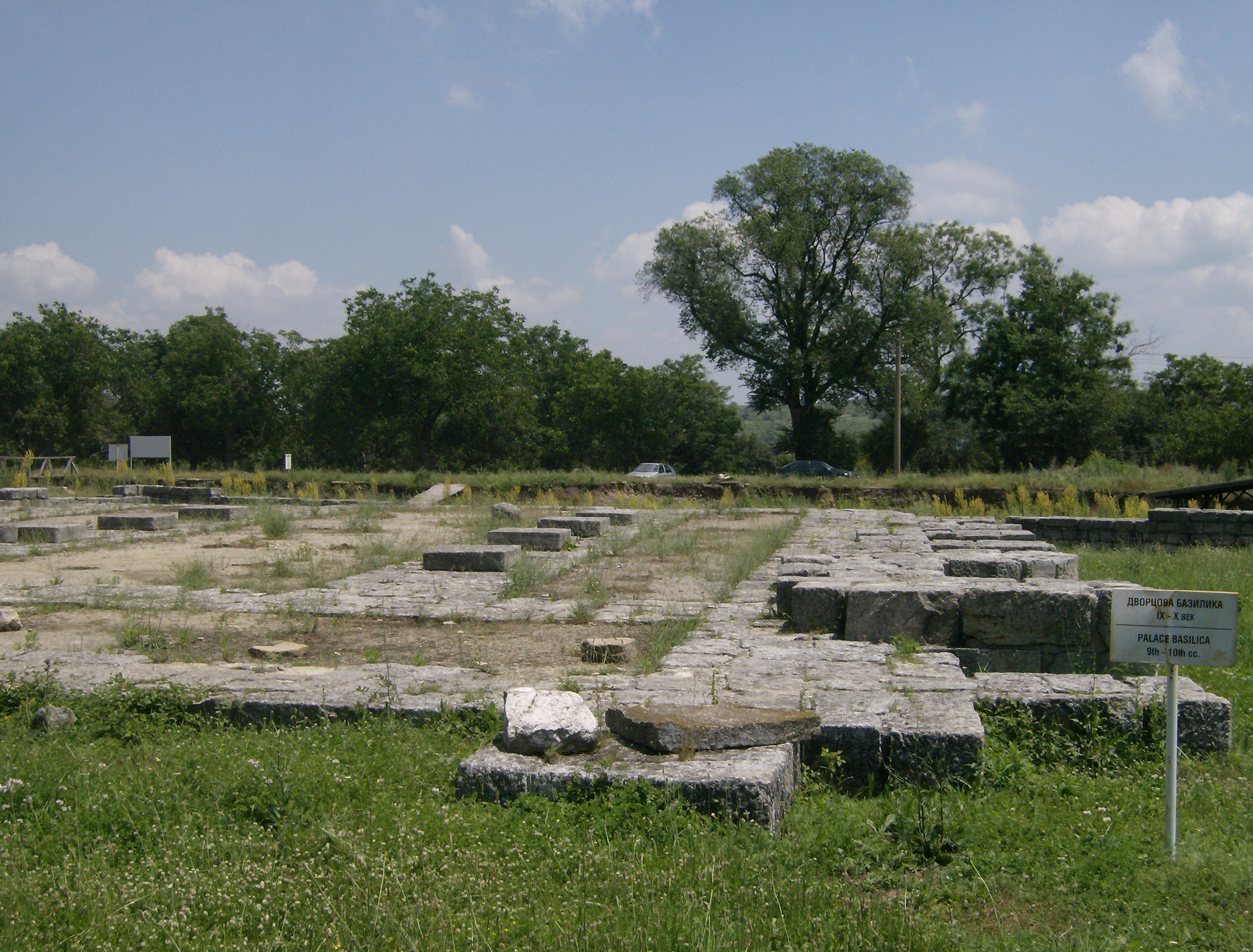

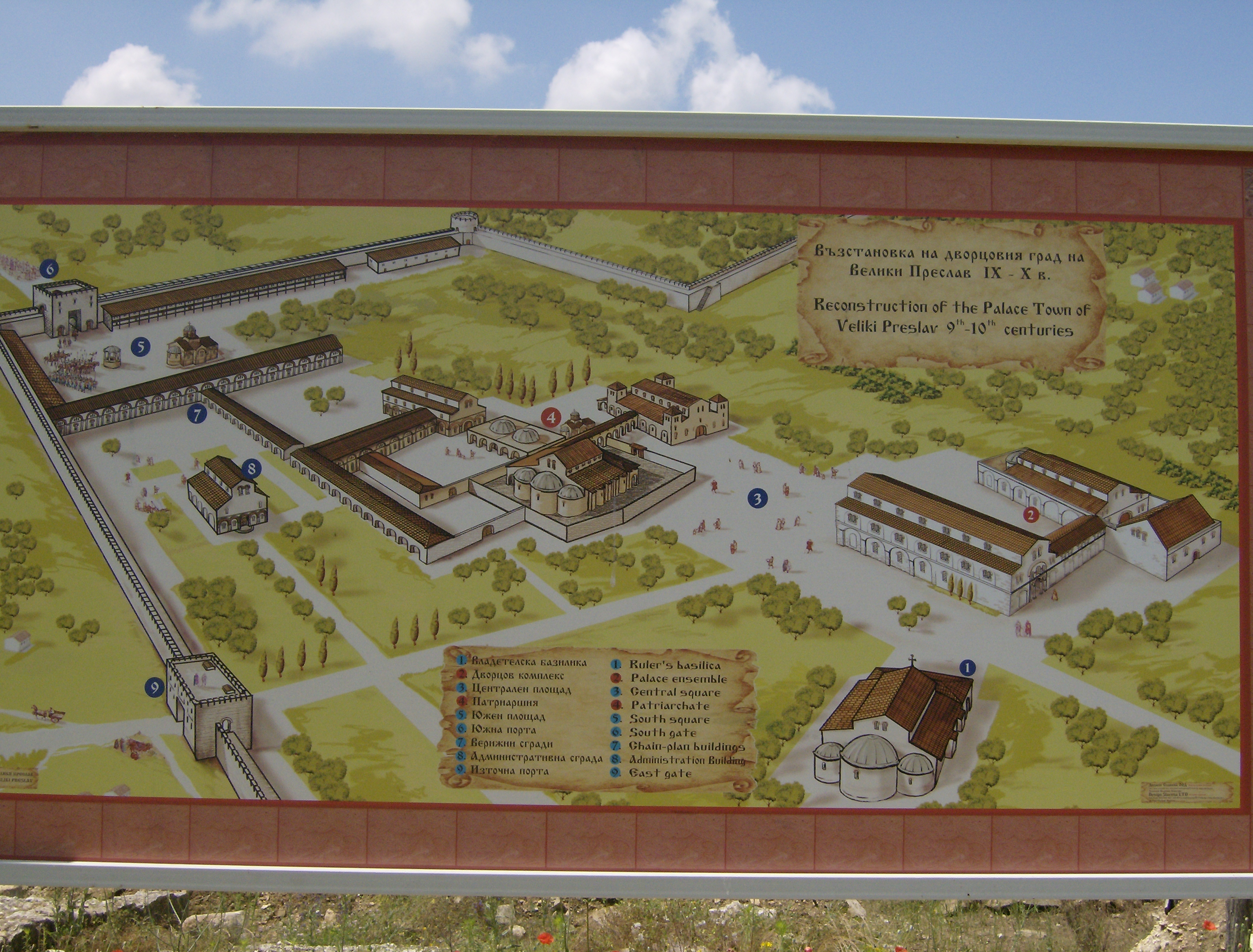

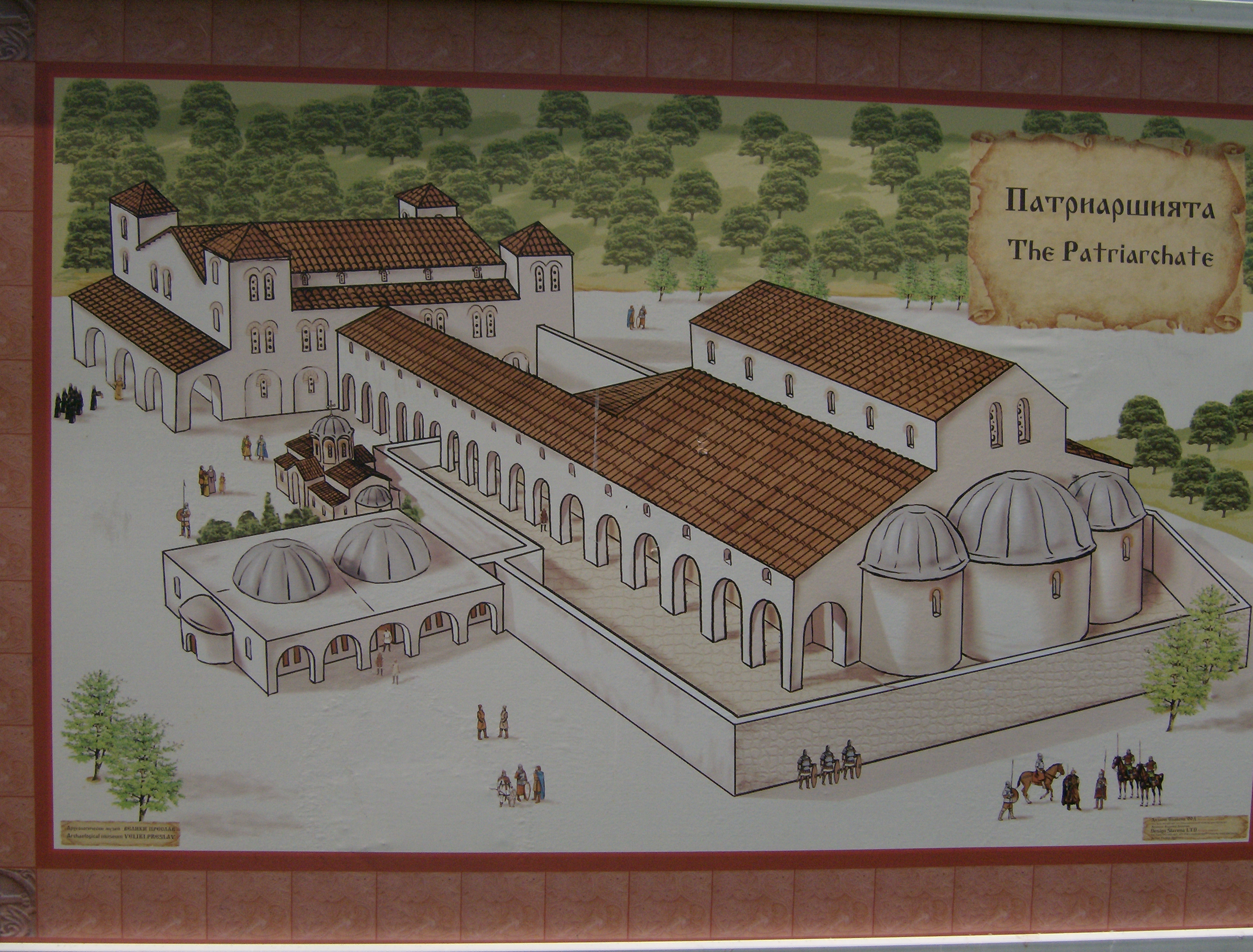

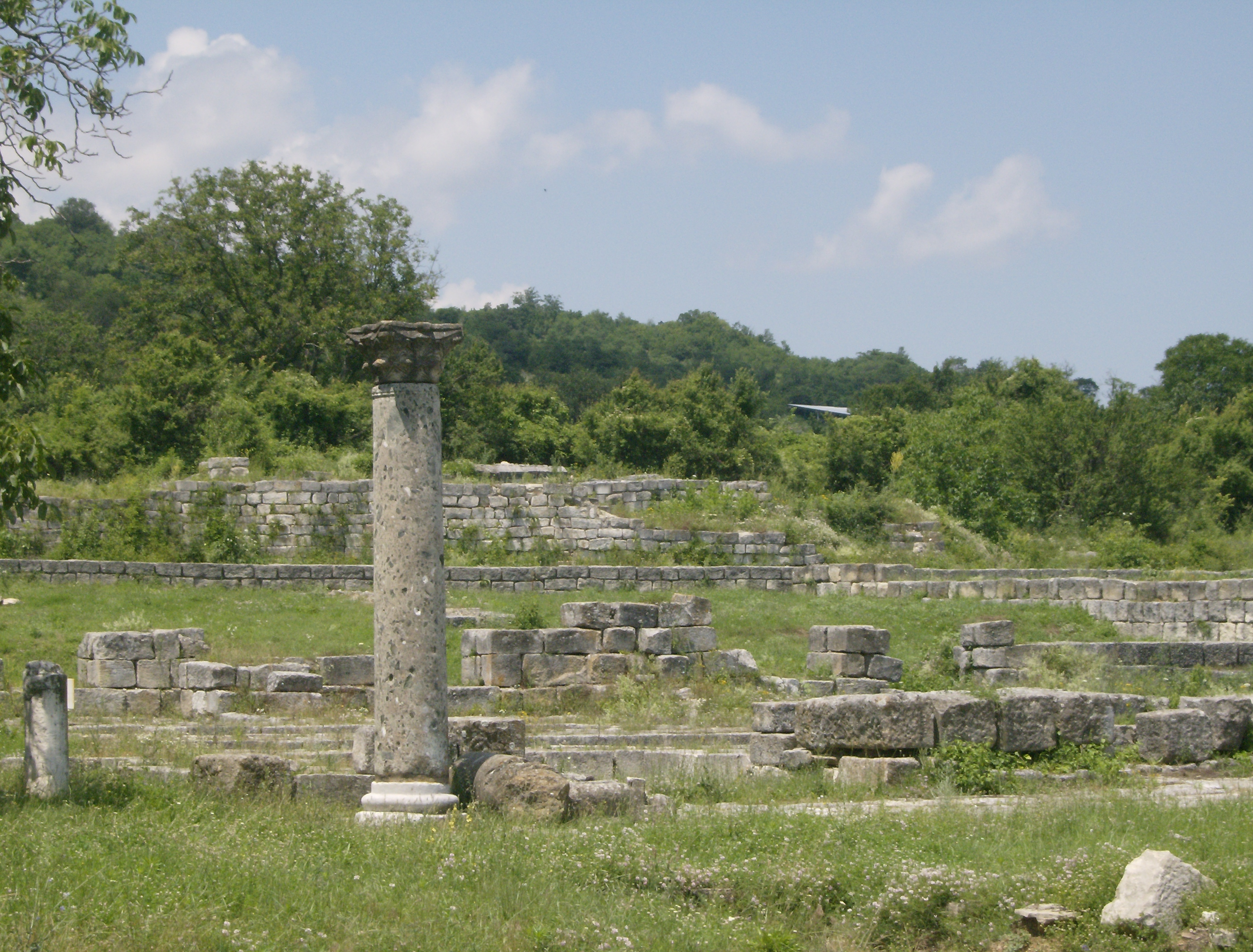

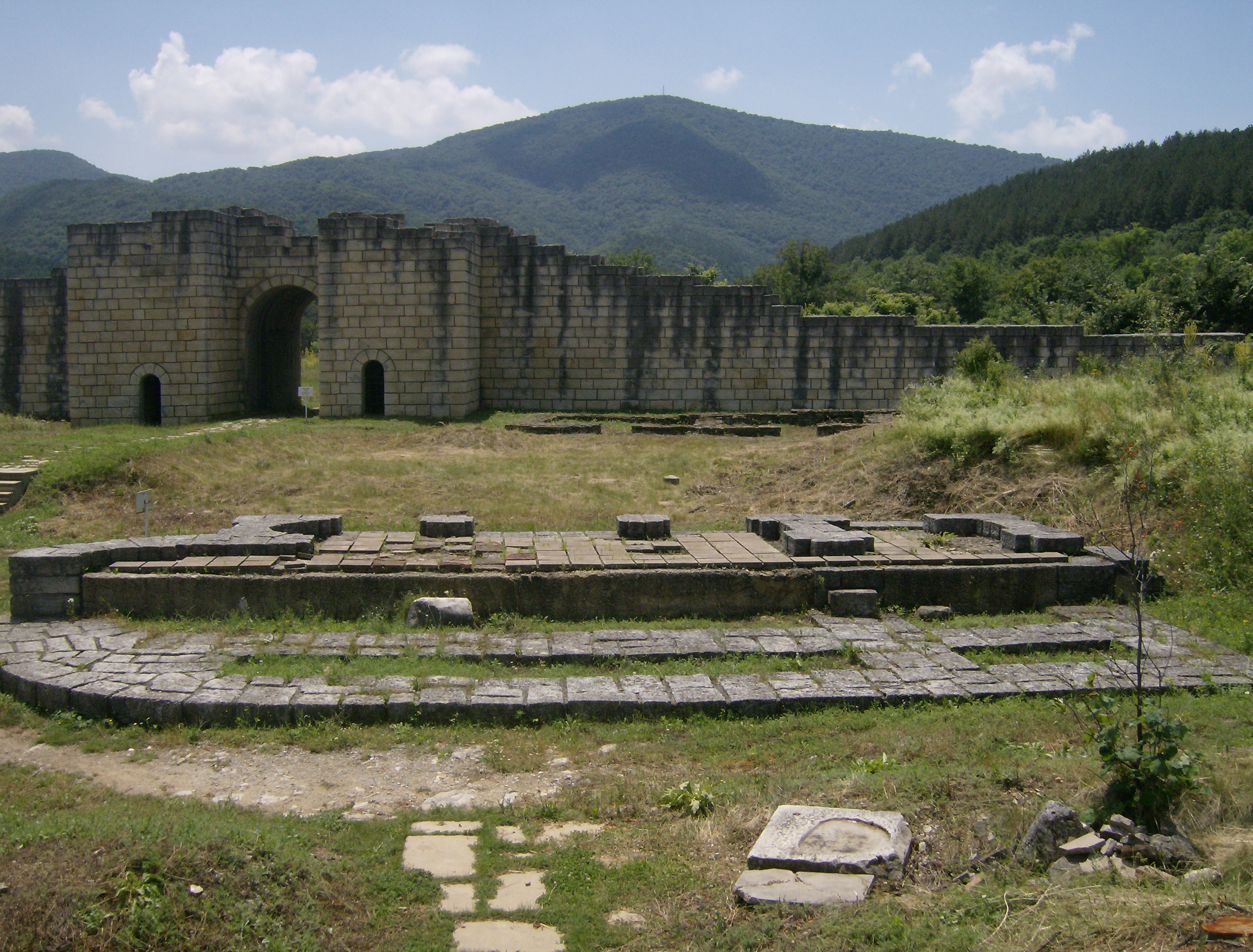

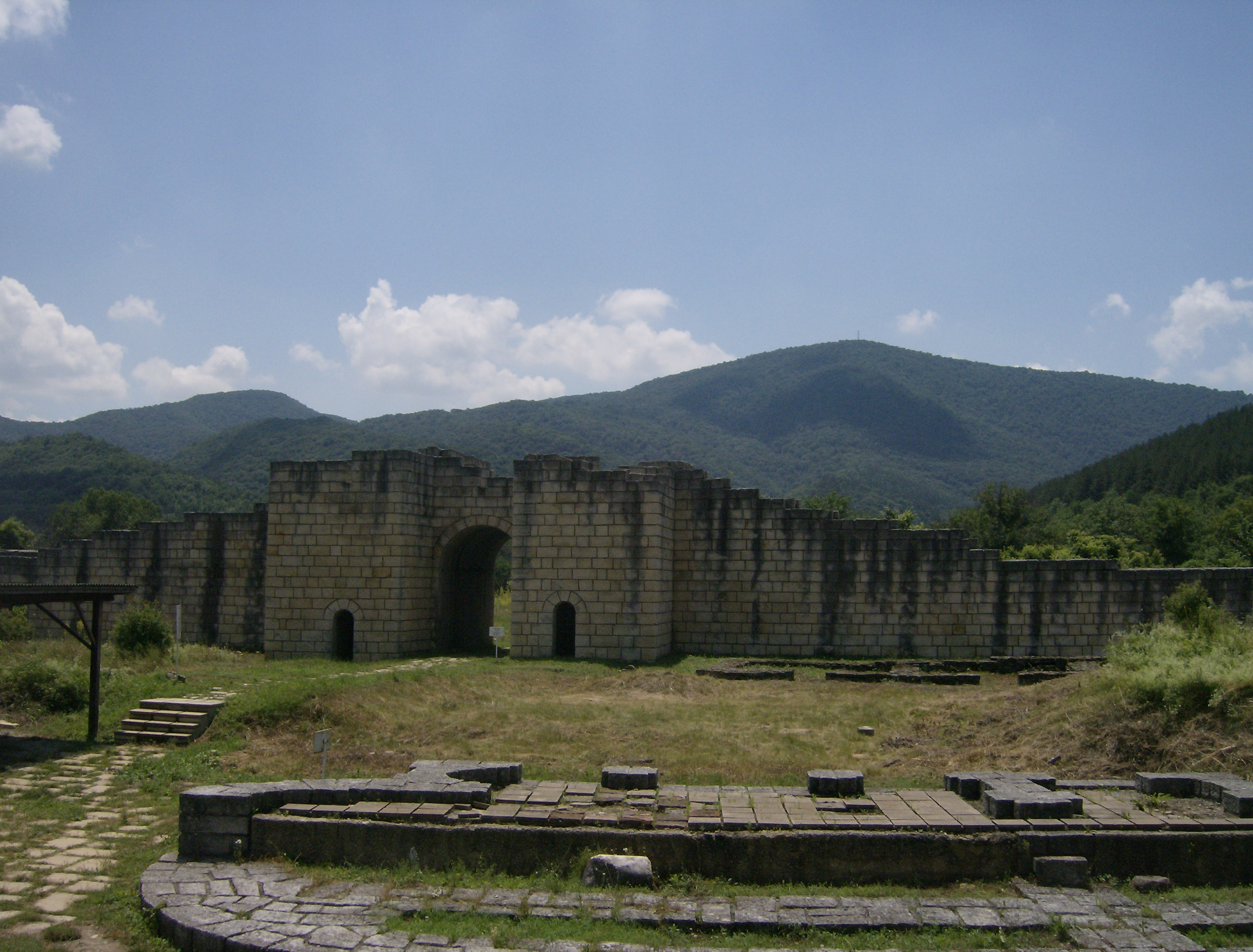

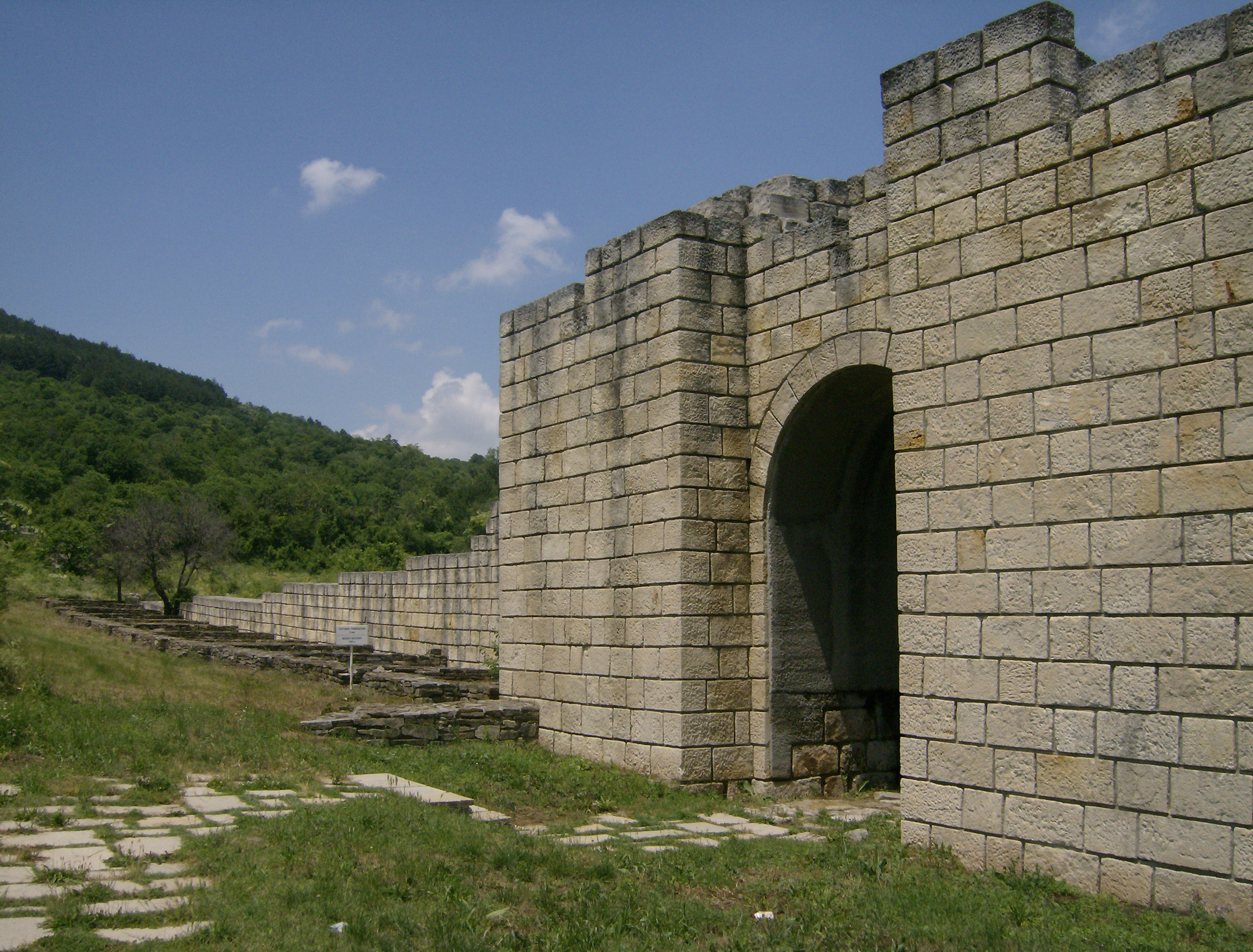

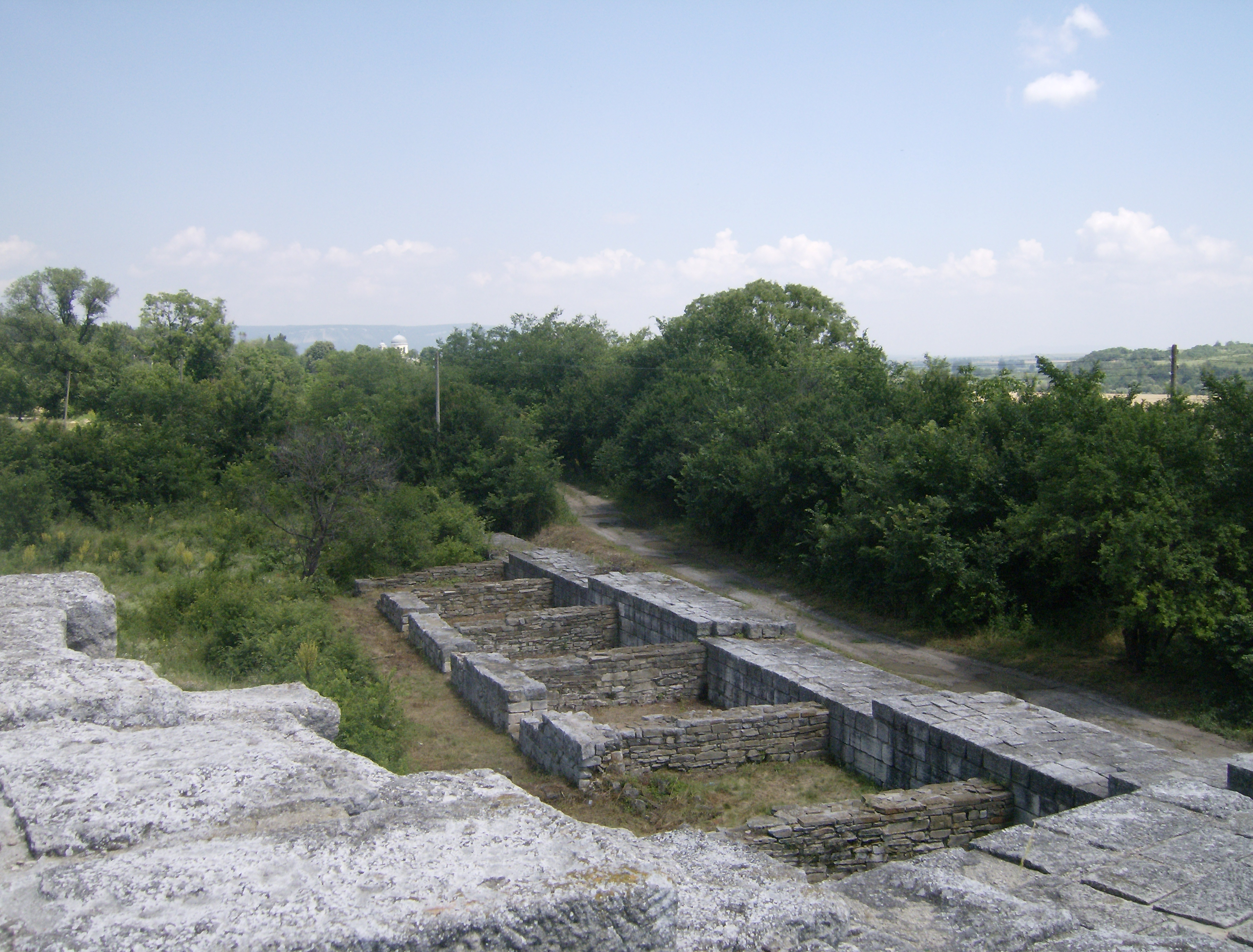

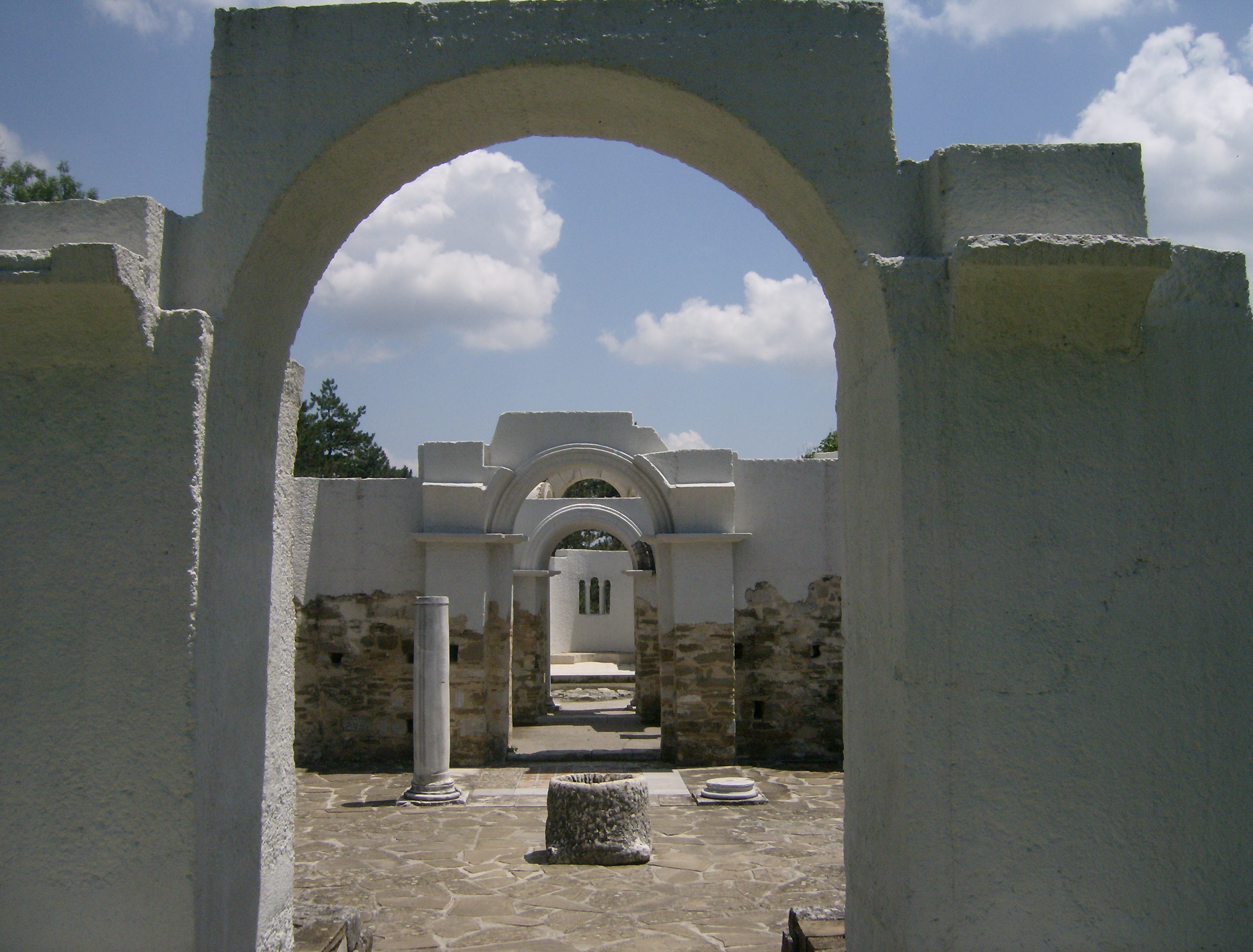

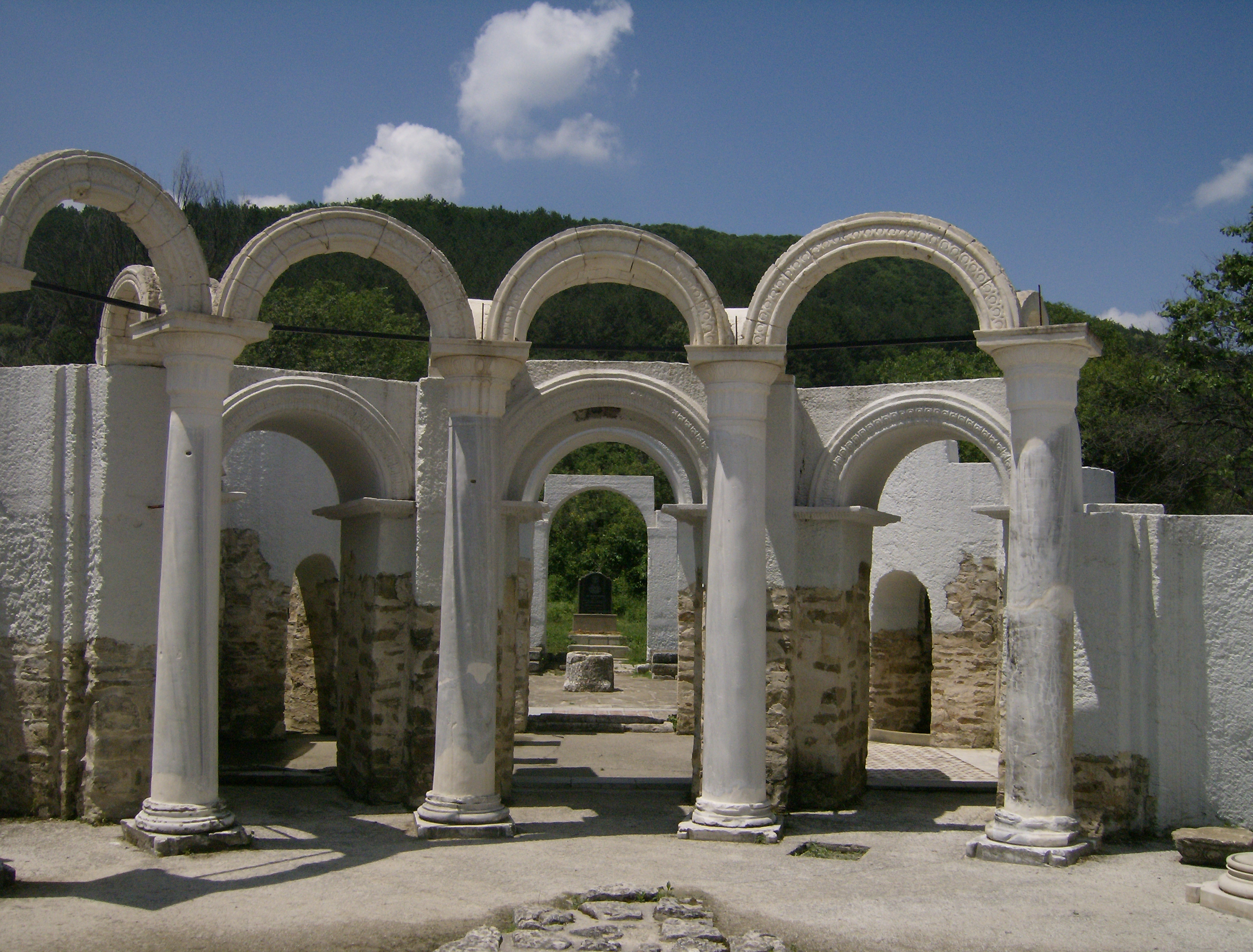

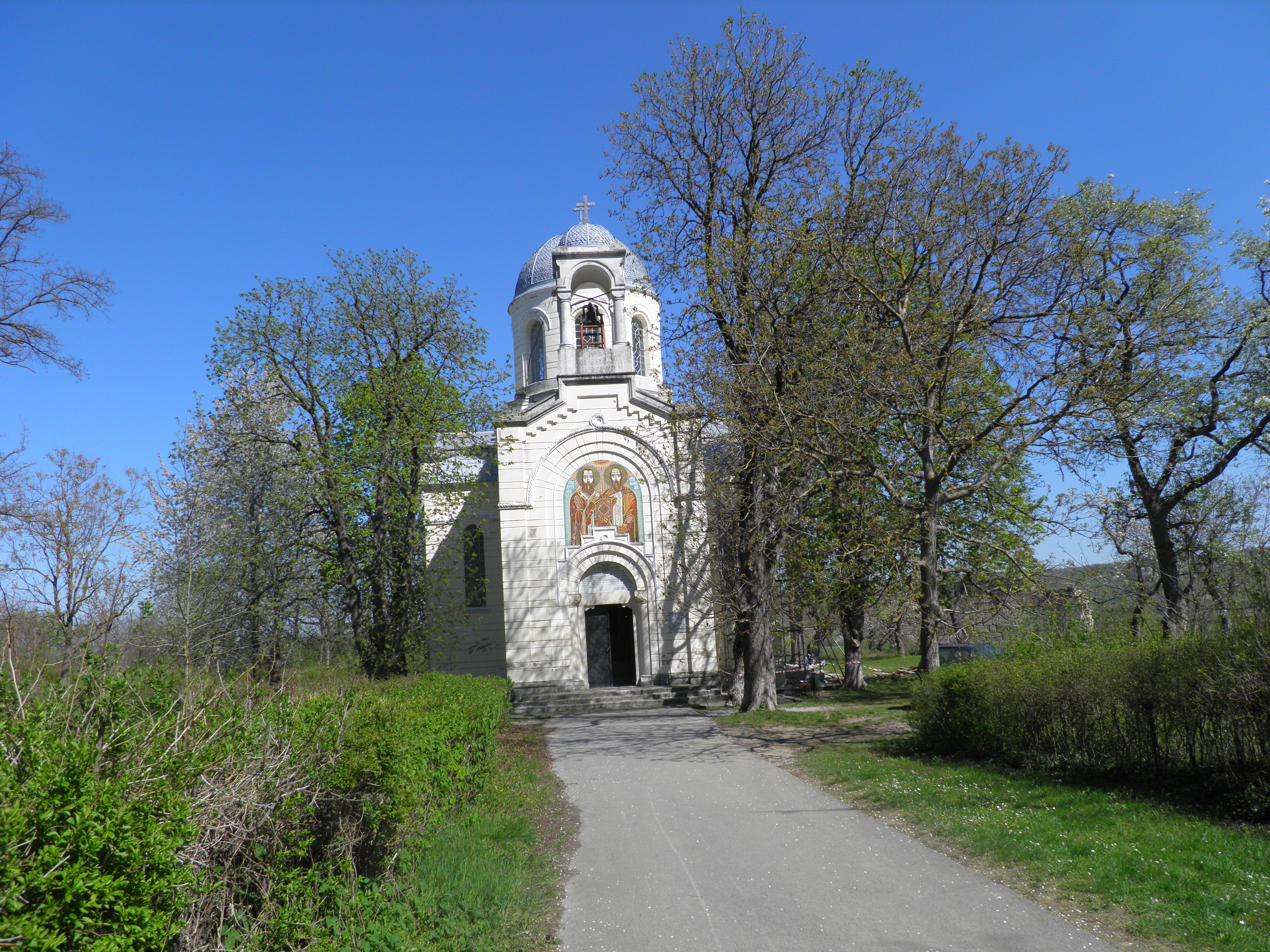

== See also ==
- Preslav treasure
