= Round Church, Preslav =

Large partially preserved early medieval Eastern Orthodox church in Bulgaria

Round Church Кръгла църква
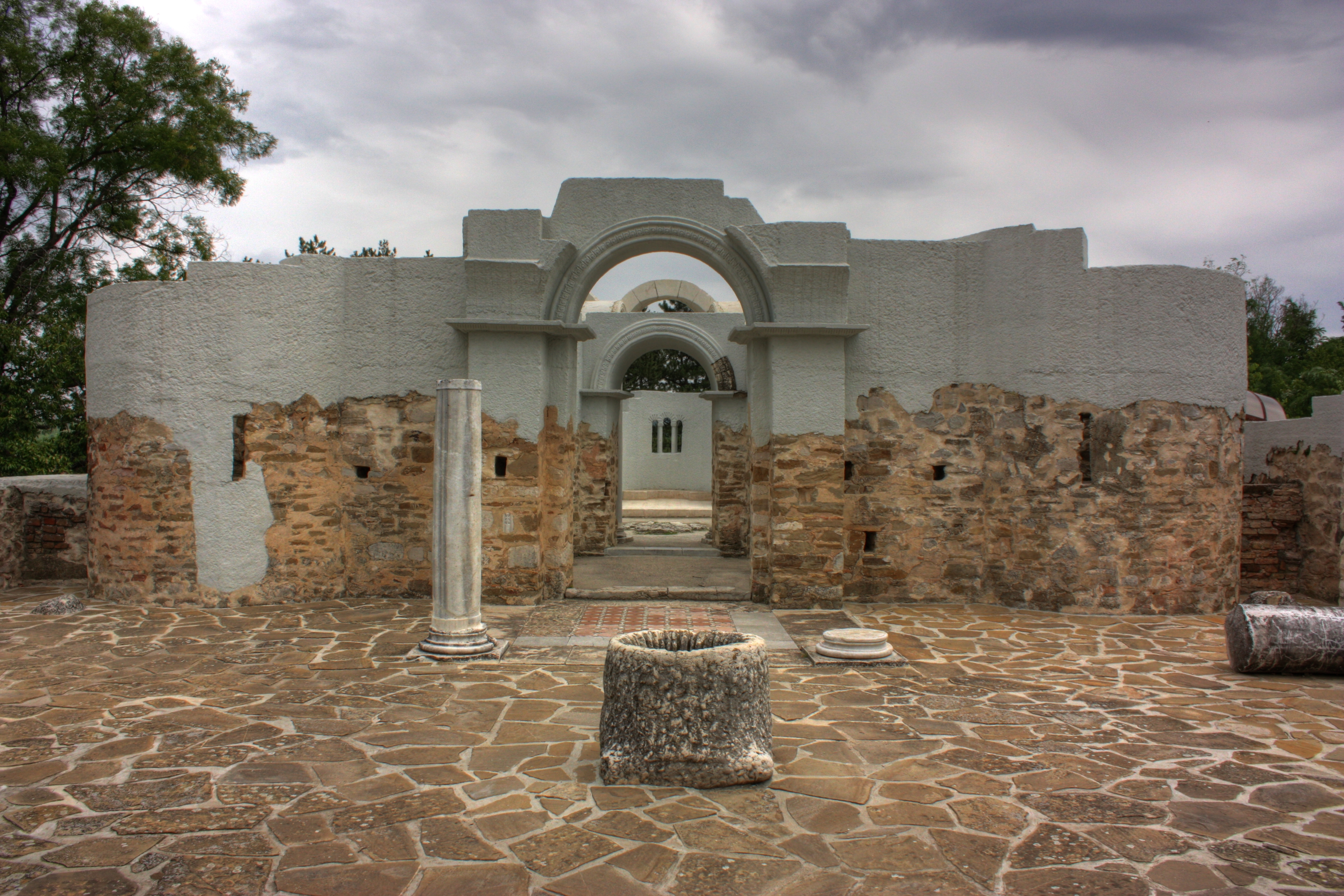
- The ruins of the Round Church in Preslav. View from the atrium entrance looking towards the narthex and rotunda gates, with the apse in the distance

- Location within Bulgaria

Religion
- Affiliation: Bulgarian Orthodox Church
- Ecclesiastical or organisational status: Cathedral
- Year consecrated: Early 10th century, possibly before 907
- Status: Preserved

Location
- Location: Veliki Preslav, Shumen Province, Bulgaria
- Coordinates: 43.1423°N 26.81295°E

Architecture
- Type: Cathedral
- Style: Early Byzantine, possible Caucasian and/or Carolingian influences

Specifications
- Direction of façade: West
- Length: 38.5 m (126 ft) (with atrium)
- Width: 14.30 m (46.9 ft) (atrium); 10.50 m (34.4 ft) (rotunda)
- Dome: 1
- Dome dia. (outer): 10.50 m (34.4 ft)

The Round Church (Bulgarian: Кръгла църква, Kragla tsarkva), also known as the Golden Church (Златна църква, Zlatna tsarkva) or the Church of St John (църква "Свети Йоан", tsarkva "Sveti Yoan"), is a large partially preserved early medieval Eastern Orthodox church. It lies in Preslav, the former capital of the First Bulgarian Empire, today a town in northeastern Bulgaria. The church dates to the early 10th century, the time of Simeon I's rule, and was unearthed and first archaeologically examined in 1927–1928.

Considered to be one of the most impressive examples of medieval Bulgarian architecture, the Round Church takes its name from the distinctive shape of one of its three sections, the cella (naos), which is a rotunda that serves as a place of liturgy. The church's design also includes a wide atrium and a rectangular entrance area, or narthex, marked by two circular turrets.

The church has been likened to examples of religious architecture from the late Roman (Early Christian) period, the Caucasus, and the Carolingian Pre-Romanesque of Charlemagne because of its characteristic plan, which is significantly different from contemporaneous Bulgarian or Byzantine buildings. The church's alternative name, the Golden Church, stems from its possible and popular identification with a "new golden church" in Preslav referenced in a medieval literary source.

The Round Church's rich interior decoration, which makes ample use of mosaics, ceramics and marble details, distinguishes it from other churches in Preslav. Its interior features hundreds of drawings depicting ships, fauna, and Christian figures. Medieval inscriptions on the walls range from names of saints in Byzantine Greek to separate letters and short texts in the Glagolitic and Cyrillic alphabets.

== Background ==
Founded in 681 as a pagan state, Bulgaria was formally Christianised by Byzantine clergy in the 860s, under Prince Boris (r. 852–889). The right to convert Bulgaria to Christianity was the subject of a political dispute between Byzantium and the Papacy. With the conversion to Christianity, Boris hoped to solve internal ethnic issues and improve the foreign relations of his state, which was not treated equally by the Christian rulers of Europe.

The Round Church was constructed during the rule of Boris' son and successor, Simeon (r. 893–927), whose successful campaigns established Bulgaria's temporary superiority over Byzantium, at times threatening the Byzantine capital at Constantinople. He extended the territory of the First Bulgarian Empire over most of the Balkans, to the Adriatic and the Aegean. Simeon also conquered the lands of modern Serbia and Montenegro and efficiently eliminated the Magyar threat from the north. Counted among Bulgaria's greatest leaders, Simeon was a benefactor of literature and the arts; his reign is considered the "Golden Age" of medieval Bulgarian culture because of Bulgaria's literary influence over contemporary Slavic Europe.

The city of Preslav was made the capital of Bulgaria early in Simeon's reign, partly because of the former capital Pliska's association with pre-Christian paganism. Simeon turned Preslav into a cultural centre, a true rival to Constantinople. Some of the most eminent scholars of Bulgaria's Golden Age worked at the Preslav Literary School. Intended more as a royal residence and a showcase of cultural power than a fortress, the city boasted impressive architecture, including a large number of characteristic palaces and dozens of churches. Among them the Round Church, regarded as "one of the most impressive monuments of medieval Bulgarian architecture" and an "expression of the highest achievements of Old Bulgarian culture", stood out.

== Identification and history ==
The Round Church is popularly identified with the "new golden church" referenced in a colophon to an Old Bulgarian translation of Athanasius of Alexandria's Orations Against the Arians. The text says that the translation was done on the order of Prince Simeon by Constantine of Preslav and copied by Theodore Dox, "at the mouth of the Ticha in the [Byzantine] year 6415 indiction 14 [907 AD], where the same prince had the holy new golden church built". It is uncertain whether the "mouth of the Ticha" refers to a narrow section of the river, to the Ustie pass near the city, or possibly to a certain location next to the outer city walls and in the direct vicinity of the Round Church ruins. This problem aside, if "golden" is to be taken literally, the source is also unclear as to whether the church is the new one among the city's golden churches, or the single golden one among the new churches in Preslav. Scholar Stancho Vaklinov considers the identification of the Round Church as the "new golden church" from literature "incontestable", while art historian Nikola Mavrodinov is of the opinion that it is probable. On the other hand, historian A. P. Vlasto believes this identification to be "not absolutely certain".

If the church from the marginal note is equated with the Round Church, then it can be conclusively dated to no more than a few years before 907. While the church can be ascribed to no later than the 10th century, some scholars have suggested that it may have been constructed directly on top of a much earlier late Roman basilica due to its antiquated plan. A possible donor (ktetor) of at least part of the church's construction is a high-ranking church official (chartophylax) named Paul, who is mentioned in an inscription inside the church. The main part of the work was likely funded by Simeon, who may have acted as a chief sponsor.

There is debate in Bulgarian academic circles as to whether the church was built as a monastery church or as a separate cathedral. If the buildings neighbouring the church are interpreted as the residential part of a monastery, it was most probably established after the construction of the Round Church, during the rule of Tsar Peter I (r. 927–969). The absence of entrances on these buildings on the sides facing the church and the presence of a large atrium make it unlikely. Another argument against the Round Church being a monastery church is its location, isolated from other buildings yet accessible to the public outside the inner city. Scholar Bistra Nikolova considers it a city cathedral and compares it in function to the Great Basilica in Pliska. Another researcher, Krastyu Miyatev, sees it as a royal church of Simeon, but art historian Nikola Mavrodinov and archaeologist Totyu Totev insist it belonged to a monastery from the beginning.

The earliest excavations of the site were carried out in 1927–1928 by archaeologists from the National Archaeological Museum in Sofia and the Bulgarian Antiquities Society under the direction of Yordan Gospodinov. A second effort headed by Krastyu Miyatev resulted in a much more in-depth study, and archaeological research at the site is ongoing. In 1927, the Round Church, along with the entirety of medieval Preslav, was proclaimed a historical and archaeological reserve and placed under state protection as a national antiquity. In 1970, it was individually included in the list of monuments of culture of national importance with a publication in that year's State Gazette, issue 46. As part of the Veliki Preslav architectural reserve, the Round Church is listed as No. 98 among the 100 Tourist Sites of Bulgaria.

The Church of St Petka in Ruse, opened in 1944, was built as a reconstruction of the Round Church in Preslav. The Round Church underwent partial restoration in the late 1990s and early 2000s. In December 2009, plans were announced to reconstruct the church in its entirety, without demolishing or altering any of the original structural remains. A monument dedicated to Tsar Simeon was unveiled in the immediate vicinity of the Round Church on 27 May 2007 to honour the 1080th anniversary of his death. Despite not being an active church, it is regularly used for baptisms and weddings.

== Architecture ==
=== Location and style ===
The Round Church was built outside Preslav's inner city, which mostly included the royal palace and its associated buildings such as the Royal Basilica. It was still within the outer city limits, and lay in Preslav's southeastern part, some 250 metres (820 ft) from the South Gate of the inner city. It was situated on a high terrace. Today the Round Church, along with the other ruins of medieval Preslav, lie not far from the modern town of Veliki Preslav, which is the administrative centre of a municipality in Shumen Province, northeastern Bulgaria.

Simplified floor plan

While no church from this age in the Slavic-populated parts of the Balkans was up-to-date with contemporary Byzantine architecture, the Round Church differs markedly because of its centralized, circular plan, which is unique in medieval Bulgarian architecture. The rounded and dynamic nature of its shapes is in contrast with the sharp rectangular designs of that period. It is most likely based on the abundant examples of late Roman or early Byzantine buildings that lay ruined in the Bulgarian lands. The layout, particularly the rotunda, resembles churches from the time of Justinian I such as the Basilica of San Vitale in Ravenna, the Little Hagia Sophia in Constantinople (today Istanbul), and the Rotunda of Galerius in Thessaloniki. Even if the plan is unusual, the technology and principles employed in its construction are contemporary to the 10th century and in accord with other monuments in Preslav.

Byzantine churches are not the only source of inspiration that researchers attribute to the Round Church. Some scholars link its design to an Armenian influence, perhaps brought to Bulgaria by craftsmen from the Caucasus. In general, churches with such an antiquated plan in the Balkans are associated with the migration of Cappadocian, Armenian, or Georgian monks. Another possible model for the Round Church in Preslav may well be found in Carolingian architecture from the time of Charlemagne, and particularly the Palatine Chapel in Aachen, western Germany, with which it shares some characteristics. At the time of the Round Church's construction, Bulgaria was in direct contact with the Frankish Empire. One trait of the Round Church that is claimed by scholars to be a very recognisable Carolingian influence is the presence of a monumental westwork.

=== Description ===
The Round Church includes three sections: the wide atrium (or courtyard), the narthex and the cella (also naos or, due to its shape, rotunda), each serving as a premise to the other. The sections were not necessarily built at the same time, and it is generally accepted that a reconstruction of the church was carried out some time after its completion. Mavrodinov and archaeologist Karel Škorpil believe the narthex and cella comprised the first building period, while the atrium was added very shortly after that and by the same architect.

The church has a total length of 38.5 m (126 ft), including the atrium. It was mostly built of rectangular limestone blocks sparingly joined with mortar. Inside the apse, the mortar is red-coloured. The floor was covered by marble and stone tiles glued on top of red mortar in the narthex and white mortar elsewhere. Red and yellow bricks and pieces of bricks were used for the atrium, the arches, and possibly the dome; some brick pieces were used to fill spaces between the stones on the walls.

==== Atrium ====
The outermost part of the Round Church is its atrium, the flanked open space leading into the narthex. It is accessed by means of three gates (one on each wall), of which the entrance on the main west wall is the most elaborate and grandest in appearance. The atrium is almost square in shape and measures 12.20 m × 14.30 m (40.0 ft × 46.9 ft). A water well was constructed in the center of the courtyard; it was linked to a water conduit.

The sides of the atrium are decorated by a multitude of vaults with piers in between. In total, there are fourteen vaults: four on each of the courtyard's three walls and one each where the west wall meets the sides. The atrium includes an equal number of round limestone columns each standing opposite one of the piers, 0.60 m (2.0 ft) apart.

==== Narthex ====
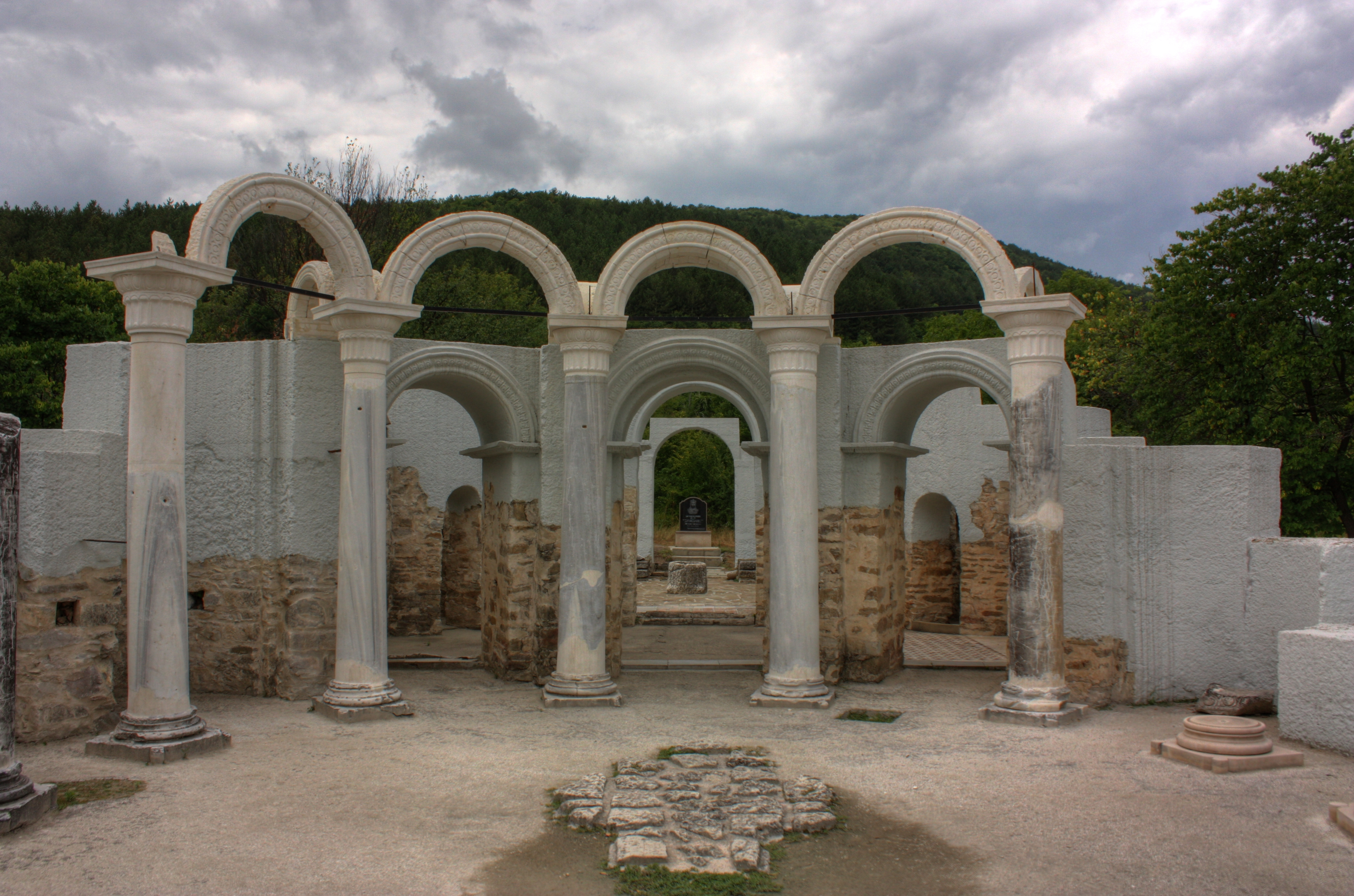
View from the centre of the rotunda west towards the atrium

The rectangular narthex constitutes the middle part of the building, between the atrium and the cella, and serves as the lobby of the church. It lies directly east of the atrium, through a wide gate flanked by a couple of high circular turrets. Mavrodinov likens the narthex of the Round Church to similar structures in the churches of Mount Athos, because of its depth.

Together with the north and south wall, the entrance of the narthex effectively isolates two smaller parts of the atrium, similar in plan and accessible through doors. The north part includes a small necropolis, while the south part was probably a baptistery, as it features a square installation with a clay pipe that resembles a baptismal font. However, Nikolova considers its shape much too unusual and its depth unsuitable for baptism, and believes it may instead have been designed as a vessel for dispensing holy water.

Measuring 5 m × 9.50 m (16.4 ft × 31.2 ft), the narthex is the part of the Round Church which has survived in best shape, as some of its walls reach 3 m (9.8 ft). Its two turrets have a diameter of 3.20 m (10.5 ft); each has an entrance facing the interior of the narthex and three windows. The higher reaches of the towers were reached via spiral stairways, archaeological remains of which have been unearthed in the north turret. There are two pairs of columns inside the narthex, supporting its second floor, which is accessible from the north tower. The columns divide the narthex into three naves and mark the way from the narthex entrance to the gates of the rotunda.

==== Rotunda ====
The round cella is the easternmost and most important part of the church, as it was where the liturgy was performed. The diameter of the rotunda is 10.50 m (34.4 ft). It is accessed through three gates, all from the narthex. It was entirely covered by a dome. Twelve vaults, semicircular as seen from the inside and pentagonal on the outer wall, were constructed north and south of the rotunda's eastern part, the apse, which itself fits into one of the vaults. Large buttresses reinforce the structure both inside and outside. A circle of ten or twelve white marble columns was inscribed inside the rotunda, 0.55 m (1.8 ft) from the interior buttresses. The capitals of the columns are similar to those of the royal palace in Preslav. A copper-plated wooden coffin lay in a burial chamber by one of the vaults near the apse.

The semicircular apse fits naturally with the other vaults of the rotunda despite being larger, and features vaults on its north and south walls. The marble ambon was situated in the center of the circle of columns and of the whole rotunda, directly under the dome's centre, as evidenced by a mortar padding. Stairs from the east and west, aligned with the apse, used to lead up to the ambon. The bishop's throne or cathedra probably lay near one of the south vaults, which was likely enlarged for the purpose.

== Decoration ==
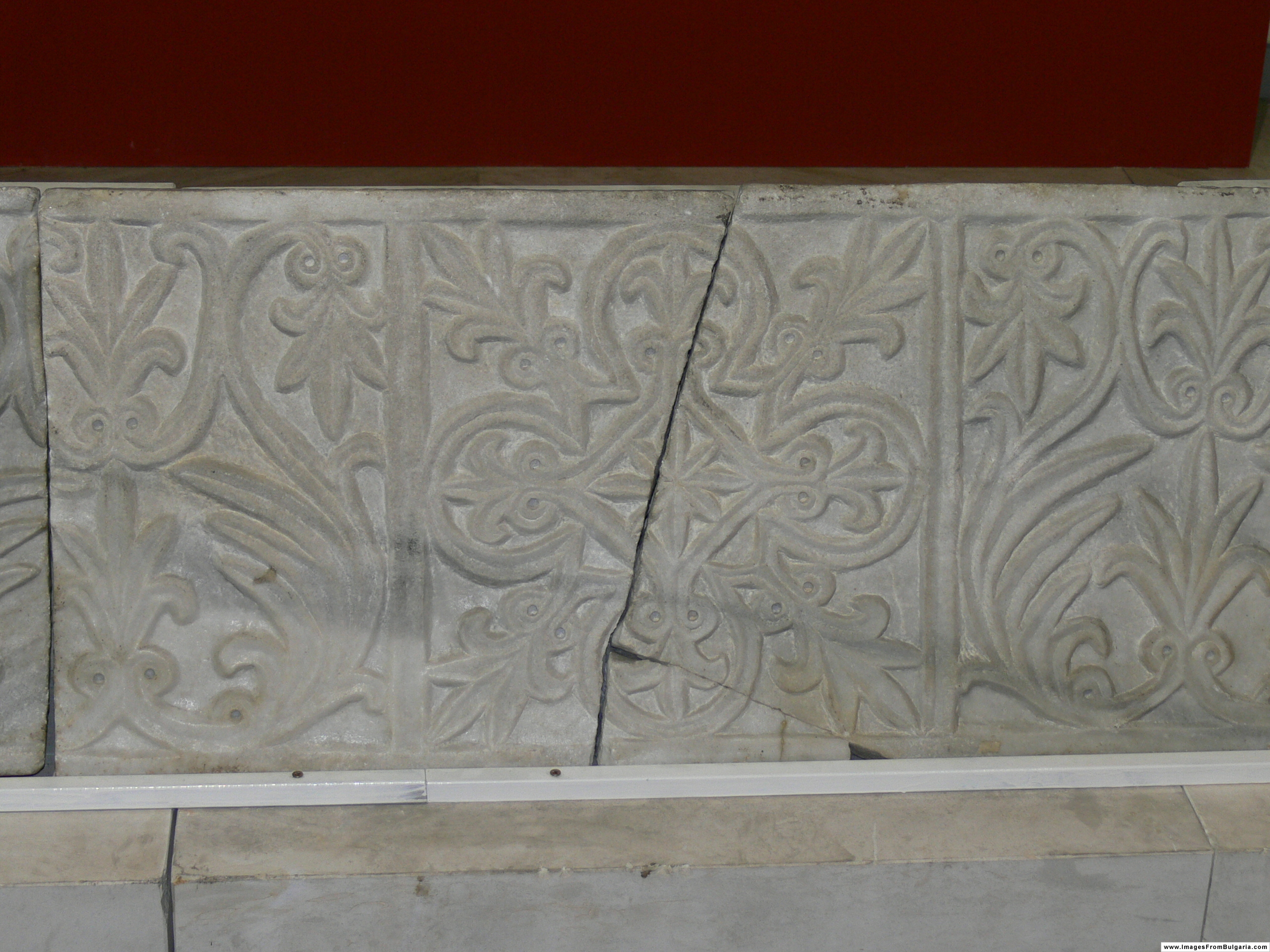
Cornice from the Round Church with floral motifs

The interior was lavishly decorated with colourful Byzantine-style mosaics, cornices, and ceramics. With the exception of the Corinthian and Doric column capitals, which are of Roman or Byzantine origin, the rest of the decoration was created specifically for and during the church's construction. Vlasto finds a Proto-Bulgarian flavour in the church's interior and a relationship with the art of Persia or Central Asia. Thus, he believes that it is not based on Byzantine examples of that age. Of a contrary opinion is Miyatev, who points out significant similarities between the decoration of the Round Church and that of the Church of the Mother of God (now part of the Fenari Isa Mosque) from 908 in Constantinople. Mavrodinov goes a step further to claim that the architect of the Round Church was directly inspired by ancient examples, citing in particular the rich sculptural decoration.

The Round Church was unmatched in its ceramic decoration by any church in Preslav, and was the only known building in the city to rely heavily on polychrome ceramic tiles. Ceramic and mosaic icons were a highlight of the interior; they ranged in size from almost life-sized to miniature. While the ceramic images were constructed out of clay tiles, the mosaic icons were more varied in their material, which included clay, glass, and stone of various shades on a gold-coloured background. Among the portrayed saints and biblical figures are Charalampus and perhaps Joel. Some of the images were enclosed in ellipses.

The Round Church featured marble and limestone cornices. These included a large number of intertwined ornaments and details, such as palmettes, grape clusters, leaves, and chamfers. Besides classic ornamental shapes, the cornices feature some that are entirely new in character or well-known yet redesigned motifs. Floral decoration dominates the cornices. Tiles found inside the church ruins depict birds and other animals in addition to geometric shapes and floral motifs, all glazed in either brown, yellow, green, blue, or blue-green. The walls were covered in polished marble facing with encrusted shapes.

== Epigraphy ==
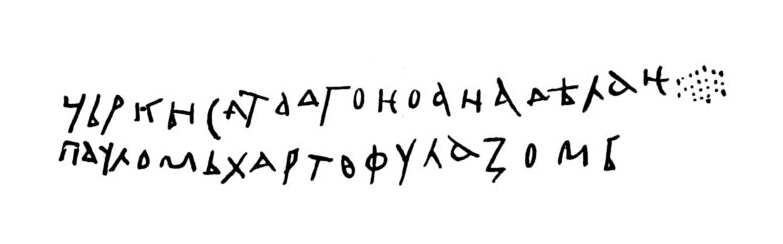
Inscription of chartophylax Paul from the interior of the Round Church

The Round Church contains many medieval inscriptions, both official and scratched on its walls as graffiti. One study counted a total of 193 signs and 30 drawings, the vast majority bearing some kind of Christian symbolism. As a whole, the epigraphy of the Round Church dates from the 10th century, and three alphabets are represented: the Greek, the Glagolitic, and the Cyrillic, as well as two languages: Byzantine Greek and Old Bulgarian (the eastern Bulgarian recension of Old Church Slavonic). The Glagolitic inscriptions of the Round Church bear evidence that the use of that alphabet in Preslav continued alongside Cyrillic.

Perhaps the most famous and valuable writing on the walls of the church is a Cyrillic inscription on the south wall of the premises south of the narthex, conventionally known as the baptistery. The inscription was clumsily written on top of a mortar putty and says in translation: "Church of Saint John, built by chartophylax Paul". Despite being dated to the 10th century and its mention of the church's dedication and its potential donor, it cannot be described a classic donor's inscription because of its unnatural location and clumsy writing. Nikolova considers it more likely that the author of the inscription was a literate person who served under chartophylax Paul and desired to spread his fame. She believes the text may refer to the construction of the narthex only rather than the whole church, because she is of the opinion that the narthex may have been added after the building of the rotunda.

Other examples of the epigraphy of the Round Church include several short Glagolitic and Cyrillic texts and separate letters. Among the Glagolitic inscriptions is the Preslav Abecedarium, a liturgical text including the first thirteen letters of that alphabet; some of the Cyrillic texts were written on ceramic tiles. The names and descriptions attached to the icons are in Greek, while there are also bilingual inscriptions in Greek and Bulgarian. Individual letters inscribed on the walls illustrate the way Greek and simplified Glagolitic letterforms were combined to form the early Cyrillic alphabet. On the walls of the church are graffiti of Christian crosses, animals, and up to 11 depictions of ships. At least one epitaph has been discovered, inscribed on the tombstone of a woman described as "God's servant Tudora".

== Sources ==
=== In English ===
- Crampton, R .J. (2005). A Concise History of Bulgaria. Cambridge: Cambridge University Press. pp. 16–17. ISBN 978-0-521-61637-9.
- Curta, Florin (2006). Southeastern Europe in the Middle Ages, 500–1250. Cambridge: Cambridge University Press. pp. 220–221. ISBN 978-0-521-81539-0.
- Kazhdan, Alexander (1991). "Bulgarian art and architecture". Oxford Dictionary of Byzantium. Oxford: Oxford University Press. pp. 334–335. ISBN 978-0-19-504652-6.
- Mango, Maria Mundell (2009). Byzantine Trade, 4th–12th Centuries: The Archaeology of Local, Regional and International Exchange: Papers of the Thirty-eighth Spring Symposium of Byzantine Studies, St John's College, University of Oxford, March 2004. Farnham: Ashgate Publishing. pp. 113–114. ISBN 978-0-7546-6310-2.
- Schwartz, Ellen C. (2002). Reconsidering the Round Church of Symeon. Sofia, Bulgaria: Palaeobulgarica XXV. pp. 2–15.
- Stavreva, Kirilka; Quek, Lynette (2007). Cultures of the World: Bulgaria. New York: Marshall Cavendish. ISBN 978-0-7614-2078-1.
- Stephenson, Paul (2000). "Bulgaria and beyond: the Northern Balkans (c. 900–963)". Byzantium's Balkan Frontier: A Political Study of the Northern Balkans, 900–1204. Cambridge: Cambridge University Press. ISBN 0-521-77017-3.
- Vlasto, A. P. (1970). The Entry of the Slavs into Christendom: An Introduction to the Medieval History of the Slavs. Cambridge: Cambridge University Press Archive. ISBN 978-0-521-07459-9.

=== In Bulgarian ===
- Delev, Petar; Valeri Katsunov; Plamen Mitev; Evgenia Kalinova; Iskra Baeva; Boyan Dobrev (2006). "10. Zlatniyat vek na balgarskata kultura" [10. The Golden Age of Bulgarian culture]. Istoria i tsivilizatsia za 11. klas [History and Civilisation for the 11th Grade]. Sofia: Knigoizdatelska kashta "Trud"; Sirma AI. ISBN 954-9926-72-9.
- Koeva, Margarita (2003). "Arhitektura na Parvoto balgarsko tsarstvo" [Architecture of the First Bulgarian Empire]. Vavedenie v arhitekturnata teoria i istoria. Uchebnik za studenti po izkustvoznanie [Introduction to Architectural Theory and History. Textbook for Art History Students]. Varna: LiterNet. ISBN 954-304-027-3. Archived from the original on 14 June 2011.
- "Kraglata tsarkva" [The Round Church]. Balgarska entsiklopedia A–Ya [Bulgarian Encyclopedia A–Ya] (CD). Sofia: Balgarska akademia na naukite; Knigoizdatelska kashta "Trud"; Sirma AI. 2002. ISBN 954-8104-08-3.
- Mavrodinov, Nikola (1959). Starobalgarskoto izkustvo: izkustvoto na Parvoto balgarsko tsarstvo [Old Bulgarian Art: The Art of the First Bulgarian Empire]. Sofia: Izdatelstvo "Nauka i izkustvo". pp. 150–164. OCLC 456107079.
- Miyatev, Krastyu (1965). Arhitekturata v srednovekovna Balgaria [Architecture in Medieval Bulgaria]. Sofia: Izdatelstvo na Balgarskata akademia na naukite. pp. 95–100. OCLC 10198565.
- Nachev, Ventseslav (1994). Balgarski nadpisi [Bulgarian Inscriptions]. Sofia: Izdatelska kashta "Hristo Botev". pp. 17–19. ISBN 978-954-445-128-8.
- Nikolova, Bistra (2002). Pravoslavnite tsarkvi prez Balgarskoto srednovekovie IX–XIV v. [The Orthodox Churches During the Bulgarian Middle Ages 9th–14th Century]. Sofia: Akademichno izdatelstvo "Marin Drinov". pp. 88–92. ISBN 954-430-762-1.
- Rashev, Rasho (1995). "Korabat kato simvol v Preslav prez X vek" [The Ship as a Symbol in Preslav in the 10th Century] (PDF). Preslavska Knizhovna Shkola. 1. Sofia: Shumenski universitet; Universitetsko izdatelstvo "Sv. Kliment Ohridski": 338–343. ISBN 978-954-07-0403-6. Archived from the original (PDF) on 24 July 2011.
- Totev, Totyu (1993). Veliki Preslav: Patevoditel [Veliki Preslav: Guidebook] (in Bulgarian). Varna: Hronos. pp. 58–63. ISBN 954-592-001-7.
- Vaklinov, Stancho (1977). "IV. Izgrazhdane na edinna starobalgarska kultura (vtorata polovina na IX — nachaloto na XI v." [IV. The establishment of a united Old Bulgarian culture (second half of 9th — early 11th century]. Formirane na starobalgarskata kultura VI–XI vek [The Formation of Old Bulgarian Culture 6th–11th Century]. Sofia: Balgarsko istorichesko druzhestvo; Izdatelstvo "Nauka i izkustvo". OCLC 314653227.
