= Church of St John the Baptist, Asenovgrad =

Church of St John the Baptist
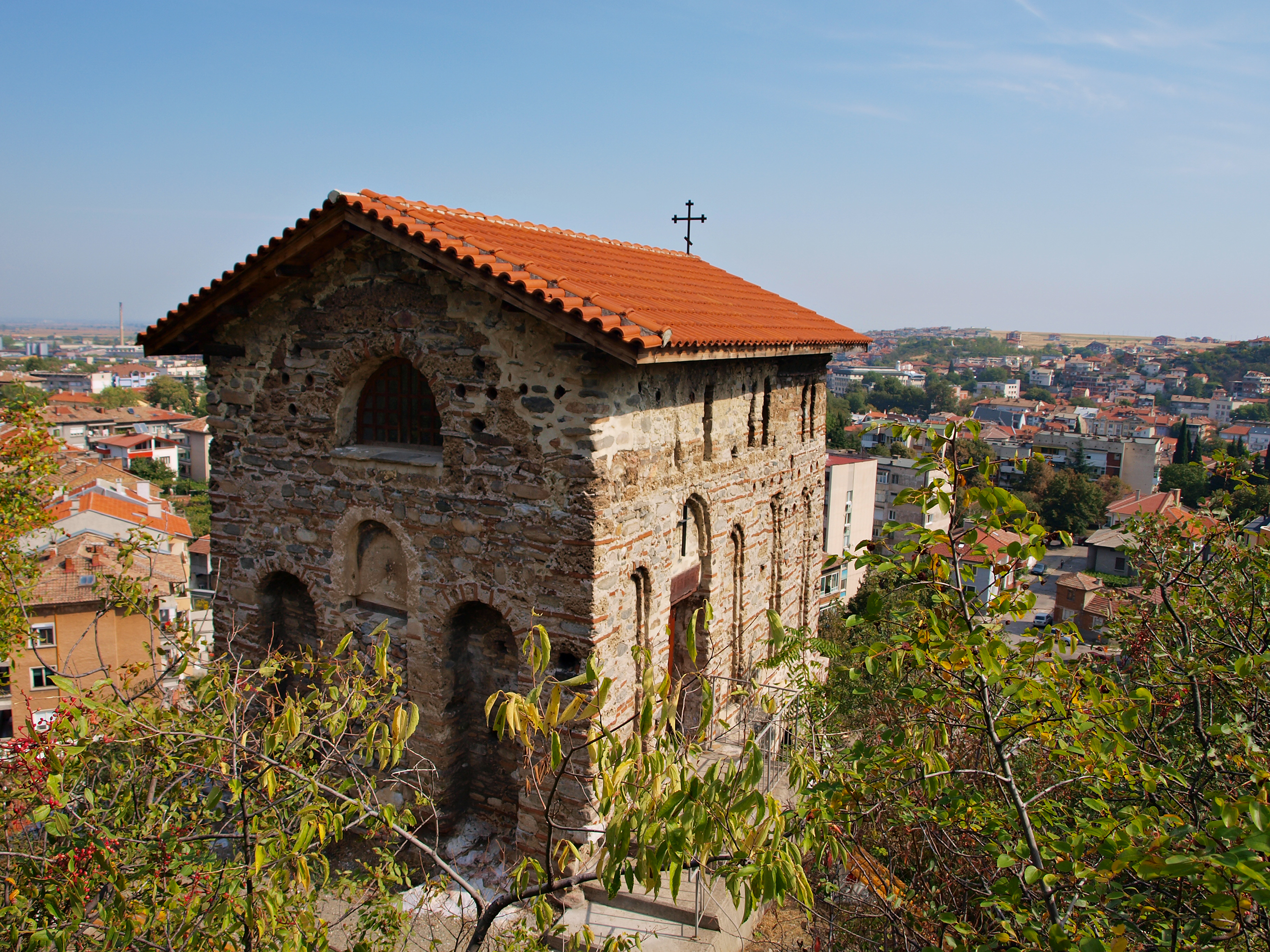
- Southwest view

- 42°1′N 24°52′E
- Location: Asenovgrad, Plovdiv Province
- Country: Bulgaria
- Denomination: Bulgarian Orthodox

History
- Dedication: John the Baptist

Architecture
- Style: Byzantine
- Completed: 12th–14th century

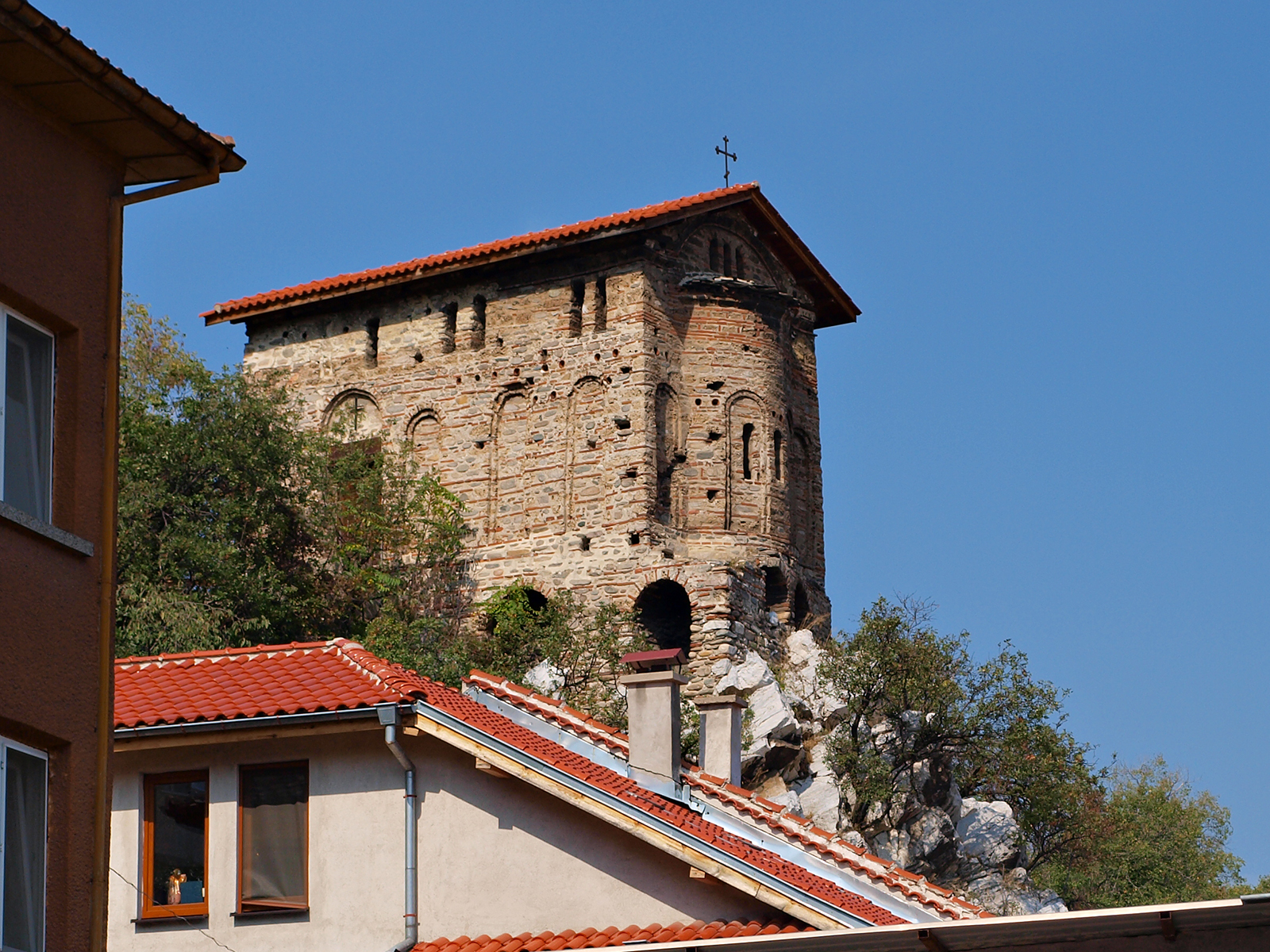
Southeast view

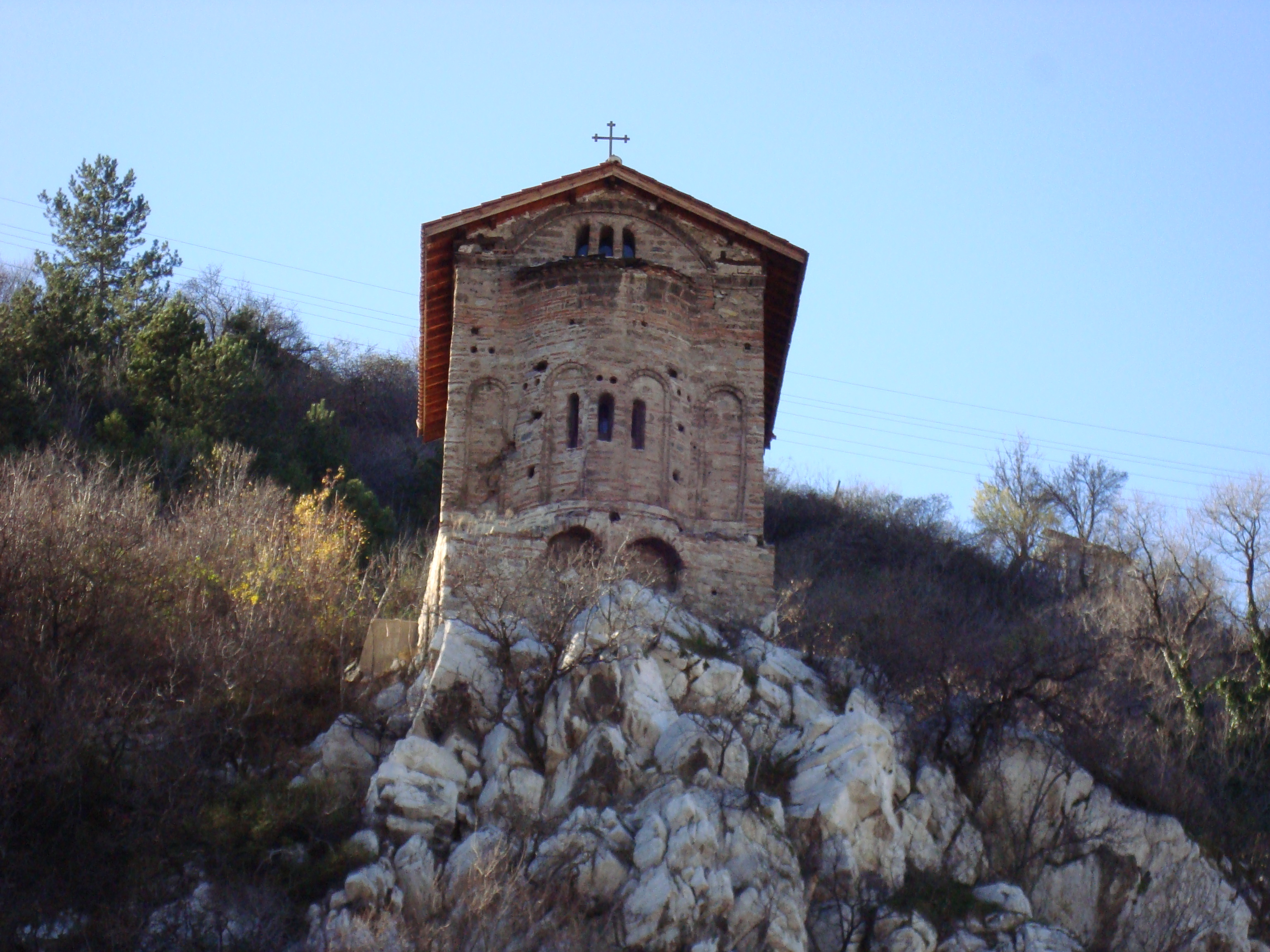
East view with the apse of the church visible

The Church of St John the Baptist (Bulgarian: църква „Свети Йоан Кръстител“, tsarkva „Sveti Yoan Krastitel“), also known as the Church of St John the Precursor or, locally, Sveti Yani or Sveti Yan, is a small medieval Eastern Orthodox church in the town of Asenovgrad in Plovdiv Province, south central Bulgaria. The church is located on a cliff west of the town and dates to the 12th–14th centuries. Its exterior is decorated with many blind arches, while its interior features mostly frescoes from the 18th century, with some fragments of 14th-century murals. Its high position and the arrowslits on the north wall made the church suitable as a defensive outpost.

== Location and history ==
The Church of St John the Baptist, known to the locals as Sveti Yani or Sveti Yan, is located on a high cliff on the western outskirts of Asenovgrad, which belong to the old town. To allow its construction, the terrain around its foundations had to be reinforced. The church lies close to several less ancient chapels, such as Saint Barbara's, Saint George's and Chapel of the Entry of the Most Holy Mother of God into the Temple. Nearby are also a 17th-century water fountain and remains of medieval fortifications which date to the 11th–13th century. Together, these buildings contribute to that part of Asenovgrad's medieval atmosphere.

The church has not been conclusively dated. Art historian André Grabar placed it in the 14th century, scholar Nikola Mavrodinov dated it to the 13th century, while archaeologist Krastyu Miyatev is of the opinion that both theories are equally likely. Architecture writer Stefan Stamov gives a possible range from the 12th to the 14th century.

The Church of St John the Baptist belonged to the northern fortifications of medieval Asenovgrad (then known in Greek as Stenimachos). It was in continuous operation until the late 18th or early 19th century, when it suffered significant damage, perhaps during Ottoman brigand raids. During the reconstruction works which were carried out soon thereafter, the roof and the upper parts of the church were modified. The interior was also repainted at the time.

The church has been protected as a national antiquity since 1940; in 1970, it was enlisted among Bulgaria's monuments of culture of national importance. The church was reconstructed in the 2000s by a team under architect Stoycho Maronov. The restoration efforts restored the windows, the interior frescoes and the iconostasis, and took 42 days.

== Architecture and decoration ==
The Church of St John the Baptist is relatively small, measuring 9.20 by 5.80 metres (30.2 ft × 19.0 ft) or 8 by 5.5 metres (26 ft × 18 ft), with a height of around 5 metres (16 ft). In terms of design, it follows the Byzantine cross-in-square style. The church lacks a narthex and features a single triangular apse with three small windows in its eastern part. The wall which carries the iconostasis clearly divides the interior into a cella and an altar. The altar includes a prothesis and a diaconicon, which are housed in bays in the east wall.

The church was built out of interchanging rows of stones and brickwork, without any ceramic facing. Blind arches form an important part of the church's exterior decoration: there are five each on the north and south walls, with an additional three on the west wall. The walls are around 1 metre (3.3 ft) thick. In its architecture, the church closely resembles other medieval religious buildings in its close surroundings, most notably the Church of the Holy Mother of God in Asen's Fortress south of Asenovgrad and the ossuary of the Bachkovo Monastery. However, the Church of St John the Baptist is unique in that it is the only one of the three to feature arrowslits. Six arrowslits on the north wall enabled the church to be quickly converted into a defensive tower.

Most of the surviving frescoes on the church's interior walls date from the 18th century. These include images of the Mother of God, Jesus Christ and John the Baptist, all painted as part of the church's first reconstruction. However, restoration works carried out in the 2000s have uncovered 14th-century murals depicting the meeting of Elizabeth and Mary as well as John the Baptist.
