= Renier of Trit =

French crusader

Renier of Trit was a knight from Trith-Saint-Léger, Hainaut, who took part to the Fourth Crusade and became the first Frankish duke of Philippopolis (modern Plovdiv, Bulgaria) from 1204 to 1205.

== Life ==
Born in Valenciennes, he was probably the son of a castellan of the town mentioned in 1141. He seems to appear in the official record in 1180. After the accession of Baldwin IX as Count of Flanders in 1194 he appears on several important acts of Baldwin, including the treaty between the latter and Richard Lionheart in June/July 1197 and another in 1199 with John Lackland.

He took the cross alongside his suzerain; in the spring 1203, in Corfu, he was one of the few leaders who advocated in favor of the diversion of the Fourth Crusade to Constantinople.

After the conquest of Constantinople and the establishment of the Latin Empire, Renier was granted Philippopolis and the territory as far as the river Maritsa by Emperor Baldwin I following the October 1204 partition of the conquered and yet to be conquered lands of the Byzantine Empire. Renier's land lay within the realm of Bulgaria, in territory claimed by Byzantium and subsequently the Franks.

Renier's first campaigns that fall and winter to take possession of his imperial fief were successful, but the next year Bulgarian tsar Kaloyan swooped down and took Adrianople and threatened Philippopolis. Renier was abandoned by his son Renier, his brother Gilles, his nephew James of Bondues and his son-in-law Achard of Verli, which tried to go to Constantinople but were captured and executed by Kaloyan. With only a small force remaining at his command, Renier holed up in the castle of Stenimaka. It was during an effort to relieve Adrianople that Emperor Baldwin was captured. In the summer of 1205, the Paulicians of Philippopolis tried to surrender the city to Kaloyan, but Renier sallied from his fortress and razed their quarter of the city, leaving the rest to the brave defence of the united Latin and Greek populations, who declared Alexios Aspietes as emperor. Nevertheless, the city was taken and the Greek quarter burned. Later that same year, the imperial regent Henry of Flanders marched into Bulgaria and relieved Stenimaka and Renier in July 1206.

== Sources ==
- Setton, Kenneth M.; Wolff, Robert Lee; Hazard, Harry W., eds. (1969) [1962]. A History of the Crusades, Volume II: The Later Crusades, 1189–1311 (Second ed.). Madison, Milwaukee, and London: University of Wisconsin Press. ISBN 0-299-04844-6.
- Longnon, Jean (1978). Les compagnons de Villehardouin: Recherches sur les croisés de la quatrième croisade (in French). Geneva: Librairie Droz.

New creation	Duke of Philippopolis; 1204–1208	Succeeded by Gérard de Strøm
