= Duchy of Philippopolis =

Crusader state established in 1204

- 1204–1230
- Status: Vassal of the Latin Empire
- Capital: Philippopolis (1204–1208)
- Religion: Roman Catholic (official); Eastern Orthodoxy (popular)
- Government: Feudal monarchy
- History
  - Established: 1204
  - Disestablished: 1230

The Duchy of Philippopolis was a short-lived duchy of the Latin Empire founded after the collapse and partition of the Byzantine Empire by the Fourth Crusade in 1204. It included the city of Philippopolis (modern Plovdiv) and the surrounding region.

== History ==
The Duchy of Philippopolis was established in 1204, shortly after the creation of the Latin Empire. Unlike the other duchies of the Empire proper, it is not mentioned in the Partitio Romaniae, the treaty that partitioned the Byzantine Empire among the members of the Fourth Crusade. Its first duke, Renier of Trit, was also not among the main leaders of the Crusade, although he was perhaps a relative or vassal of the first Latin Emperor, Baldwin, as both came from Hainaut. Renier quickly faced a revolt of the Greek lords of Thrace, supported by the Bulgarian ruler Kaloyan, who was already at war with the Latin Empire. Feeling unsafe in Philippopolis with its hostile population, Renier had to retreat to the fortress of Stenimachos with only forty knights. They were not relieved until July 1206. Captured by Kaloyan, the city was lost by his successor Boril following his defeat at the Battle of Philippopolis in 1208.

Although not included in the provisions in the Partitio Romaniae, the Republic of Venice nevertheless claimed rule over three eighths of the Duchy, as elsewhere in the Empire. In ca. 1223/24, the then lord of Philippopolis, Gerard of Estreux (otherwise known as Gerard or Girard of Stroim, perhaps a form of Estrœung - Étrœungt - or Estreux) declared himself prepared to acknowledge the claims of Venice, and accord it suzerainty over part of his possessions.

In the draft treaty concluded in December 1228 between John of Brienne and the regents of the Latin Empire, it was agreed that after his death, John's heirs would either take possession of the duchy (among other European territories) or of the Latin possessions in Asia Minor. However, in the treaty finally ratified in April 1229 (or 1230, according to Buchon), the rights of Gerard of Estreux over the duchy were confirmed.

The territory of the duchy finally joined the Bulgarian Empire in the aftermath of Tsar Ivan Asen II's victory over the Empire of Thessalonica at the Battle of Klokotnitsa in March 1230.

== Dukes of Philippopolis ==
- Renier of Trit (1204–1208)
- Gerard of Estreux (1208–1229/30)
- John of Brienne (1229/30–1237)

== Bibliography ==
- Fine, John V. A. Jr. (1994) [1987]. The Late Medieval Balkans: A Critical Survey from the Late Twelfth Century to the Ottoman Conquest. Ann Arbor, Michigan: University of Michigan Press. ISBN 978-0-472-10079-8. OCLC 749133662.
- Hendrickx, Benjamin (2015). "Les duchés de l'Empire latin de Constantinople après 1204: origine, structures et statuts". Revue belge de philologie et d'histoire (in French). 93 (2): 303–328. doi:10.3406/rbph.2015.8837.
- Van Tricht, Filip (2011). The Latin Renovatio of Byzantium: The Empire of Constantinople (1204–1228). Leiden: Brill. ISBN 978-90-04-20323-5.
- Van Tricht, Filip (2022). "The Duchy of Philippopolis (1204–c. 1236/37): A Latin Border Principality in a Byzantine (Greek/Bulgarian) Milieu". Crusades. 21 (1): 91–120. doi:10.1080/28327861.2022.12220024.
