= Asenovgrad =

Asenovgrad Асеновград
- Town
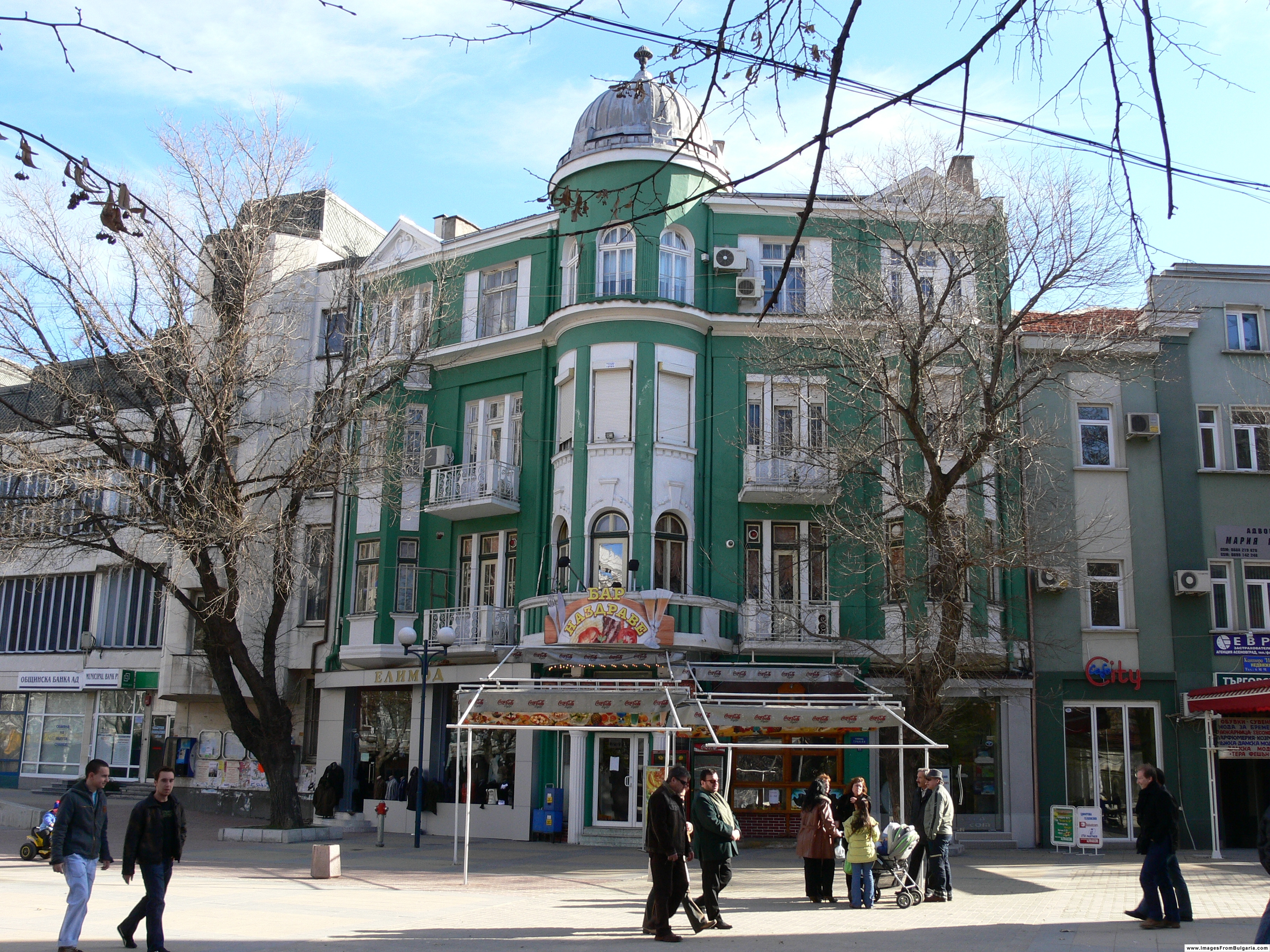
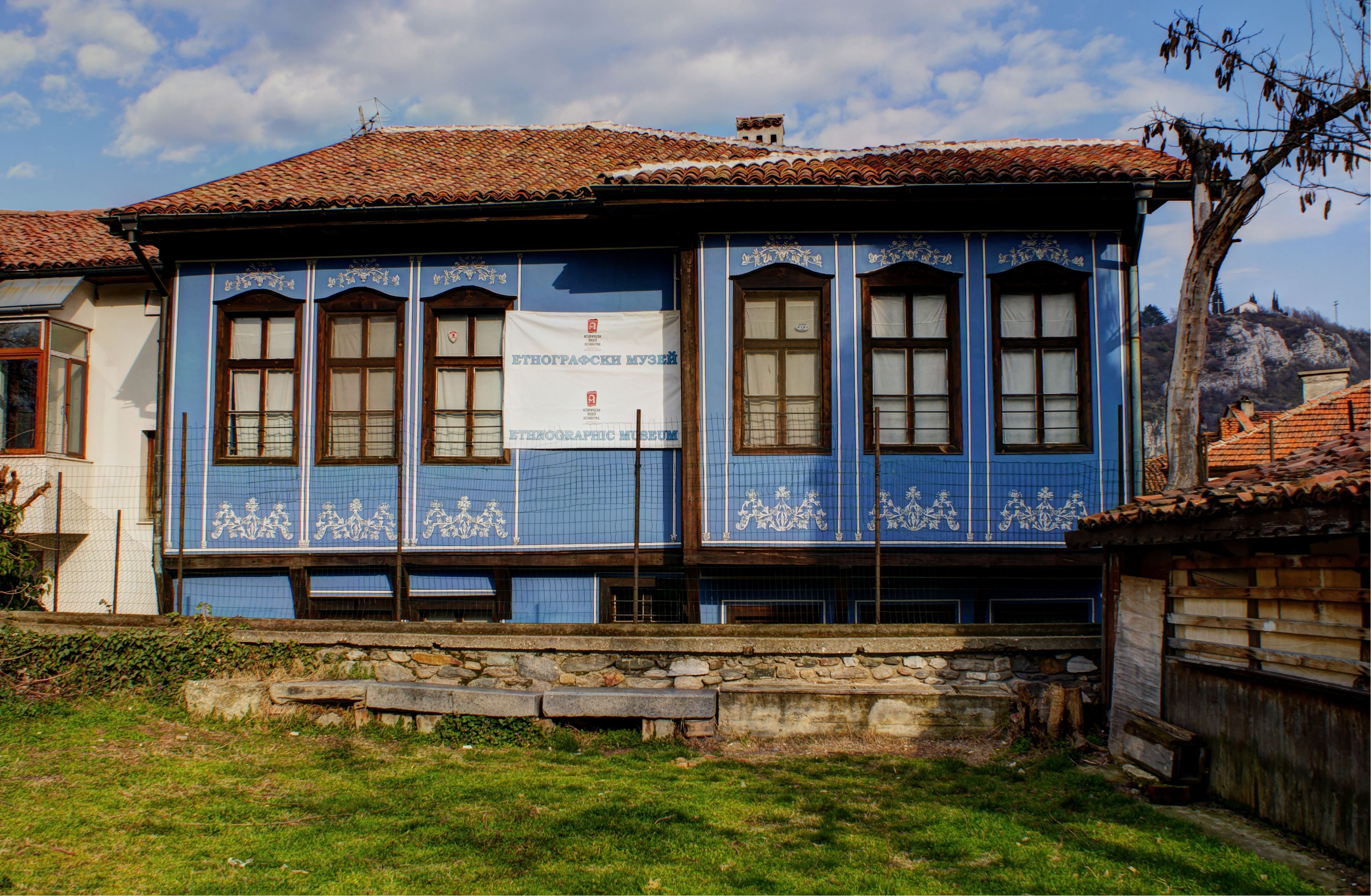
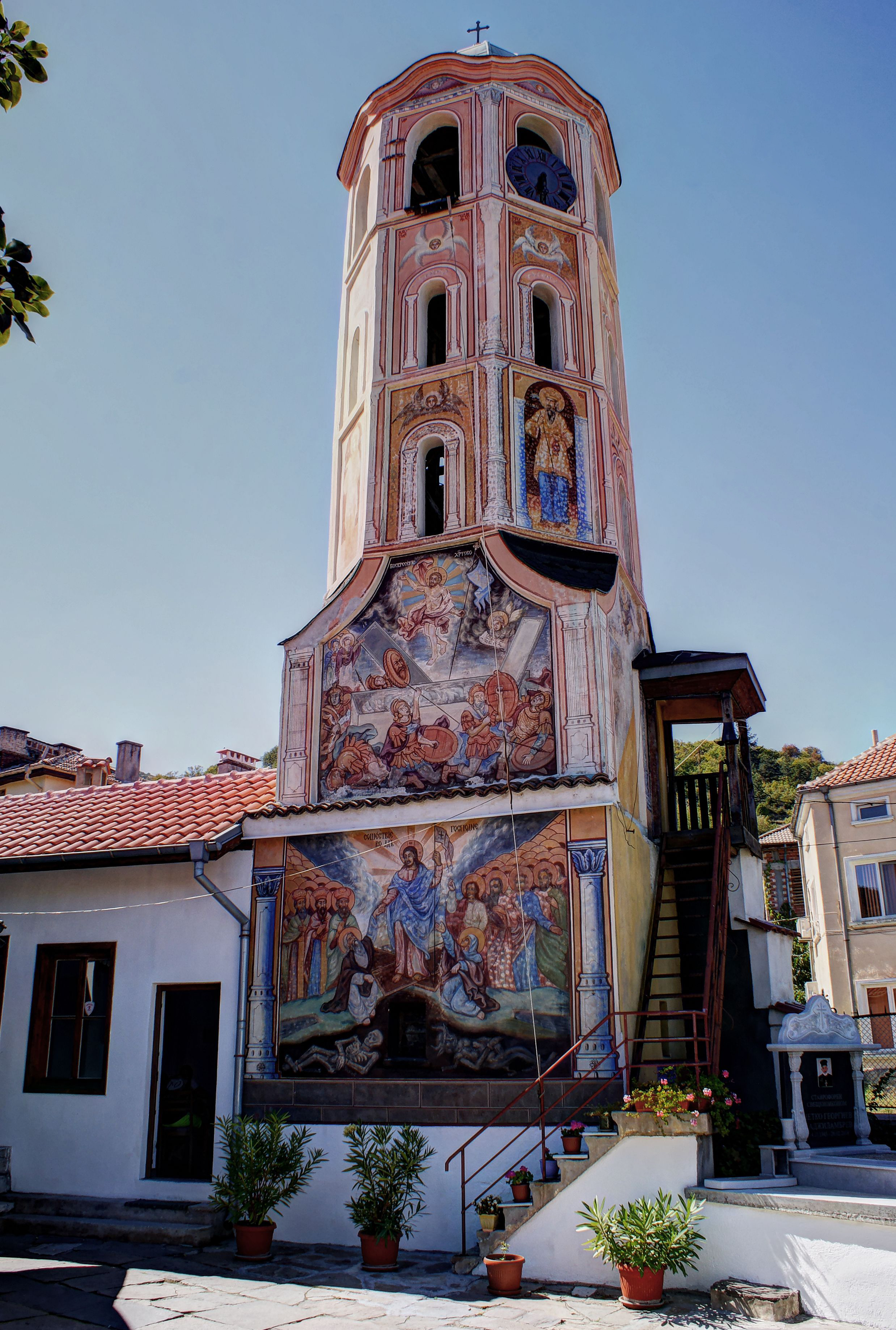
- From the top, Town Centre, Ethnograph Museum, Church of the Dormition

- Coat of arms

- Location of Asenovgrad Asenovgrad (Balkans)
- Coordinates: 42°1′N 24°52′E
- Country: Bulgaria
- Province (Oblast): Plovdiv

Government
  - Mayor: Hristo Grudev

Area
  - Town: 78.012 km^{2} (30.121 sq mi)
- Elevation: 269 m (883 ft)

Population (Census February 2011)
  - Town: 54,778
  - Density: 702.17/km^{2} (1,818.6/sq mi)
  - Urban: 65,962
- Time zone: UTC+2 (EET)
  - Summer (DST): UTC+3 (EEST)
- Postal Code: 4230
- Area code: 0331
- License plate: PB
- Climate: Cfa
- Website: Official website

Asenovgrad (Bulgarian: Асеновград [ɐˈsɛnovˌɡrat]) is a town in central southern Bulgaria, part of Plovdiv Province. The seat of Asenovgrad Municipality, it is the largest town in Bulgaria that is not a province center. Previously known as Stanimaka (Станимака) or Stenimachos, it was renamed in 1934 after the 13th-century tsar Ivan Asen II. Asenovgrad includes the districts of Gorni Voden and Dolni Voden, which until 1986 were separate villages.

The town is situated between the Upper Thracian Plain and the Rhodope Mountains along the river Chepelarska reka.

Above the town are the remains of the Asen's Fortress, an old castle that was strengthened under Ivan Asen II and turned into an important military post in the defense of the southern borders of the Second Bulgarian Empire. The city is known for its many churches, monasteries and chapels and is often called Little Jerusalem. It is also known as the "City of Bridal Gowns" because of the large number of ateliers and shops for wedding dresses and accessories.

According to the census data of 2021, the population of the city is 47 815 people.

== History ==
Asenovgrad was founded by the Thracians as Stenímachos (Greek: Στενήμαχος) around 300–400 BC. In 72 BC the city was captured by the troops of the Roman Empire as part of the Roman expansion towards the Black Sea. After a long period of peace, the town was destroyed by the Goths in 251, but rebuilt later. In 395 the Roman Empire was divided into two parts and the city fell under Byzantine Empire control. Afterwards, the Slavic tribes settled the region (until around 700 AD) and became the majority of the population.

During the wars between the Bulgarian Empire and the Byzantine Empire, the city became a major military stronghold for the Bulgarian rulers. Due to aggravation of the relationships with the Latin Empire, in 1230 Bulgarian Tsar Ivan Asen II strengthened the local fortress Stanimaka and for this reason the city was named after him in 1934 (literally city of Asen). After Bulgaria was conquered by the Ottoman Empire, Roma and Turks settled in Stanimaka, and nowadays make up 15% of the municipality of Asenovgrad's population, the rest 75% being ethnic Bulgarians and 10% – unknown and others.

The town was also inhabited by Greeks (52% in 1900) up to the post-World War I population exchanges between Bulgaria and Greece. Bulgarians from various regions in Greece settled in Asenovgrad, while its Greek inhabitants went to Naousa and Kilkis in Macedonia. Naousa and Kilkis are currently sister towns of Asenovgrad.

Tane Nikolov, revolutionary and leader of the Internal Macedonian Revolutionary Organization, spent his last years in Asenovgrad and died here in 1947.

== Cultural and natural sights ==
The city is a destination for religious and cultural tourism. Its main attractions are the Monastery of St. Petka, Arapovo Monastery and Gorni Voden Monastery. Around the city there are 5 monasteries, 15 churches and 58 chapels (for which the city earned the nickname "The Little Jerusalem"), also there are historical, ethnographic and paleontological museums and 2 kilometers from the town is Asen's Fortress.

Outside of the town is the 40 Springs hunting and fishing resort. The climate is very pleasant during the winter and cool in the summer, which made the city and its surroundings very attractive for tourism. The southeast portions of the city are noted for tourist destinations and their urban development, including Parakolovo and the 40 Springs complex.

In the late twentieth century the town was known for one of the first Bulgarian discos, Dzumbare, with 600 seats and a round dancing floor, it was completed in 1977 and was located in the Asenovets hotel complex, which is full recovering, but the disco no longer exists.

=== Asen's Fortress ===
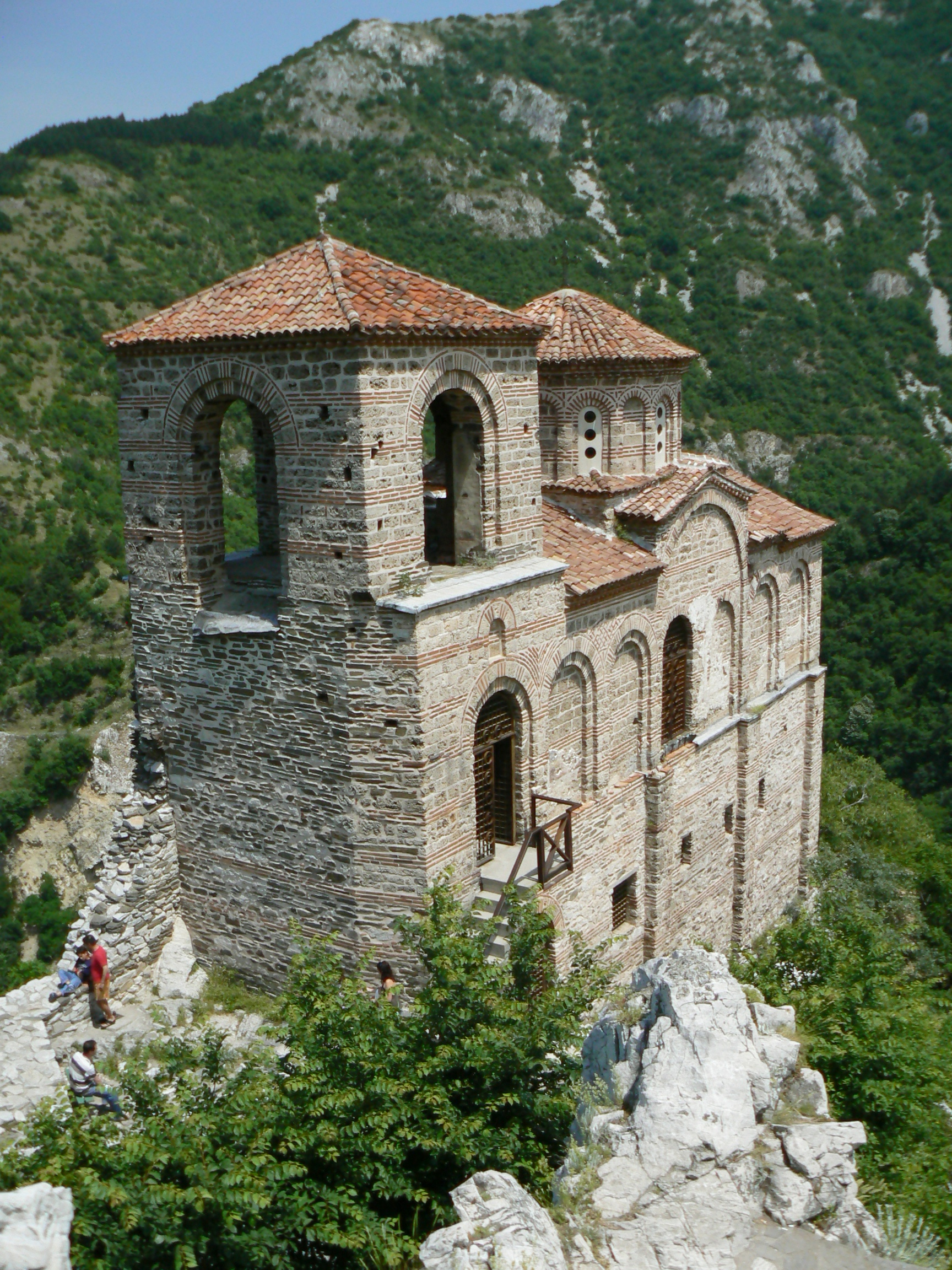
Medieval Bulgarian Church of the Holy Mother of God at Asen's Fortress

Asen's Fortress is located 2 kilometres (1.2 mi) from the town proper, in Rhodope Mountains. The fortress has existed since the time of the Thracians, and during the Middle Ages was a main strategic point. The fortress is named after king Ivan Asen II. The Church of the Holy Mother of God is the only wholly preserved building in the complex. In 1991 after a full restoration of the church, it begin to function as an orthodox temple.

The fortress is among the top 100 National tourist sights of Bulgaria and it is open during the entire year to visitors. Thousands of people and tourist walk to the top daily to take photographs, to relax and to see the beautiful view.

=== Paleontological museum ===
The paleontological museum in the city is affiliated with the National Museum of Natural History in Bulgaria. It was founded in 1990 and has one of the largest paleontological collections in the country. Among the exhibits there are saber-toothed tiger, tiger metailurus, deinotherium, bear – indarctos and others.

=== Historical Museum ===
The Historical Museum - Asenovgrad preserves and presents the rich past of this region: curious archaeology, an impressive history spanning old and modern times, and hundreds of exhibits that silently tell the story of the life and culture of the area. The foundation of museology in Asenovgrad was laid in 1926 with the establishment of the "Svarog" archaeological society, which set up the first historical and archaeological collection in the building of "St. Prince Boris I" high school.

In 1971, the museum moved to the specially renovated and adapted halls of the former Military Club, built in 1898 in the city center, where it is located today. In 2005, a complete renovation of the museum's exposition was carried out, with an emphasis on the departments of "Archaeology", "History of Bulgaria XV–XIX Century", and "Modern and Latest History". Today, the Historical Museum of Asenovgrad includes four main departments: "Archaeology", "Ethnography", "History XV–XIX Century", and "Modern and Latest History". It is located on the central "Acad. Nikolay Haitov" square, in the heart of the city.

Stanimaka, the old name of Asenovgrad until 1934, is a city with ancient roots and a rich cultural heritage. Its favorable location between the plain and the mountains, the mild climate, and the fertile soil are the reasons why people have settled here since ancient times. The museum's exhibitions trace the history of the region chronologically from the Paleolithic era to the present day—uncovering curious stories about battles, discoveries, and the successes of enterprising residents of Asenovgrad. Among them are craftsmen and merchants who developed businesses with tobacco, vineyards, and aromatic wines, or skilled masters who distributed bridal accessories and beautiful products as far as the lands of Europe.

=== Ethnographic House ===
Historical population
Year	Pop.	±%
1887	12,191	—
1910	12,969	+6.4%
1934	17,773	+37.0%
1946	20,952	+17.9%
1956	25,265	+20.6%
1965	37,433	+48.2%
1975	42,962	+14.8%
1985	47,143	+9.7%
1992	52,360	+11.1%
2001	51,936	−0.8%
2011	50,846	−2.1%
2021	45,943	−9.6%
Source: Censuses

The Ethnographic House in Asenovgrad presents the urban life from the late 19th and early 20th centuries. The building was constructed in the mid-19th century as the residence of a wealthy merchant family of Greek origin - the Chanos family, who lived in it until 1906. Afterward, the building became municipal property and was used as a primary school for some time. The house was declared a cultural monument in 1973, and in 1989, the Ethnographic Exposition was opened within it, showcasing the characteristic urban life of Stanimaka (present-day Asenovgrad) from the late 19th and early 20th centuries.

Architecturally, the building is two-storied, with an oriel-windowed upper floor, typical of Revival-era urban architecture. Its exterior façade is painted blue, decorated with garlands of white flowers above and below the windows. The interior decoration is rich. The rooms are painted in various colors (beige, grey, blue, Pompeiian red, and green) and adorned with alafrangas (decorative wall niches/frescoes). Both floors feature a hayet-a central common room characteristic of urban homes of the era. The dining room and living room are located on the first floor, while the second floor holds the bedroom and two guest rooms, one for men and one for women. The furnishing is in the "Secession" (Art Nouveau) style, combined with traditional Bulgarian elements such as minders (low sofas), Chiprovtsi carpets, and carved furniture. Of particular interest are the wood-carved ceilings, decorated with the famous "Olympic Sun" ornament. The house's yard preserves authentic cobblestones, old herbal shrubs, and a fig tree, which complement the atmosphere of Revival-era Asenovgrad. Today, the Ethnographic House is not only a museum but also the home of the artwork of the artist Kosta Forev, who vividly recreates the spirit and colorful character of old Stanimaka in the Naivism style. His paintings decorate the walls of the house and give this cultural center an additional artistic appearance.

=== Old School "Saint George" ===
The Old School "Saint George" is the first purposefully designed school building constructed in Asenovgrad, located next to the church of the same name in the "Saint George" quarter. The building was erected one or two years before the Liberation (1878) and initially functioned as a Greek municipal primary school up to the 4th grade. Starting in 1906, teaching in Bulgarian began at the school. After World War II, children from other city quarters also studied there, and for a period of 20–25 years, the building served as a dormitory for the students of "Saint Dimitar Solunski" High School. In 1997, the building suffered a fire, but thanks to a European project, it was renovated in 2001. Since 2006, it has housed an exhibition dedicated to education and culture in Asenovgrad from the late 19th and early 20th centuries.

Today, the school is a spacious building with two exhibition halls on the first floor and four large rooms on the second floor. One of the second-floor halls has been restored as a period classroom, and another recreates the atmosphere of the bookstore of Dimitar Andreev - Gandhi, a prominent bookseller from Asenovgrad. The remaining halls present the social and cultural societies from the late 19th and early 20th centuries. The original architecture and the well-maintained exhibition spaces make the Old School "Saint George" a valuable cultural and historical site that preserves the spirit of education and cultural life in Asenovgrad's past.

== Culture ==
The southern part of the town is known for its distilleries. Asenovgrad's wines are appreciated all over the country.

The town is famous for its numerous shops for wedding dresses and many Bulgarians come here in order to prepare for their wedding ceremonies.

Due to its specific geographical location the residents of the town enjoy a breeze called вечерник (literally "evening wind").

== Sport ==
The football club FC Asenovets Asenovgrad currently plays in the Third Amateur Football League.

== Twin towns – sister cities ==
Asenovgrad is twinned with:

- Bergama, Turkey
- Denpasar, Indonesia
- Derinkuyu, Turkey
- Dimitrovgrad, Serbia
- Kilkis, Greece
- Naousa, Greece
- Nilüfer, Turkey
- Prilep, North Macedonia
- Stary Oskol, Russia

== Gallery ==
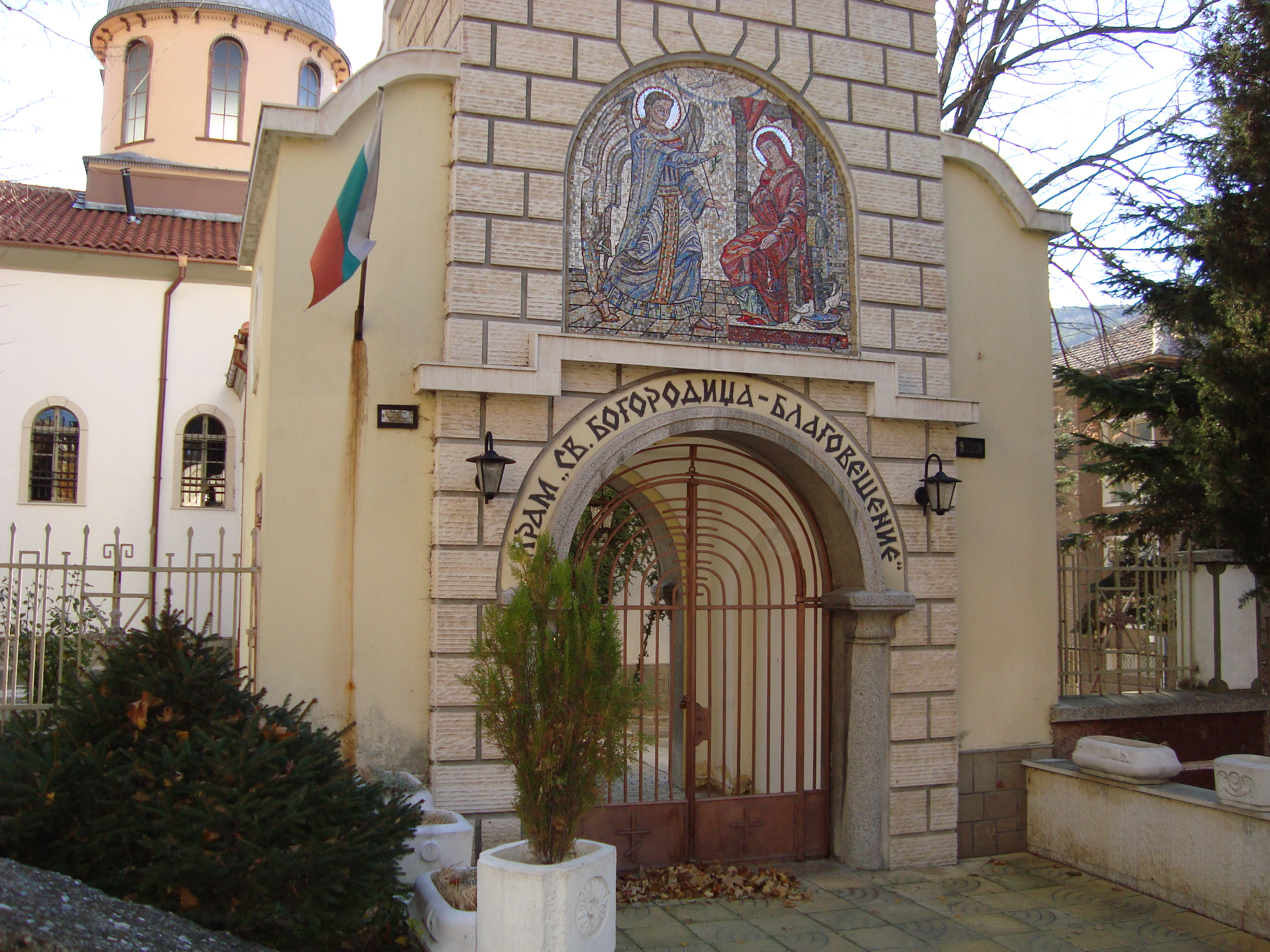
St. Bogoroditsa – Blagoveshtenie

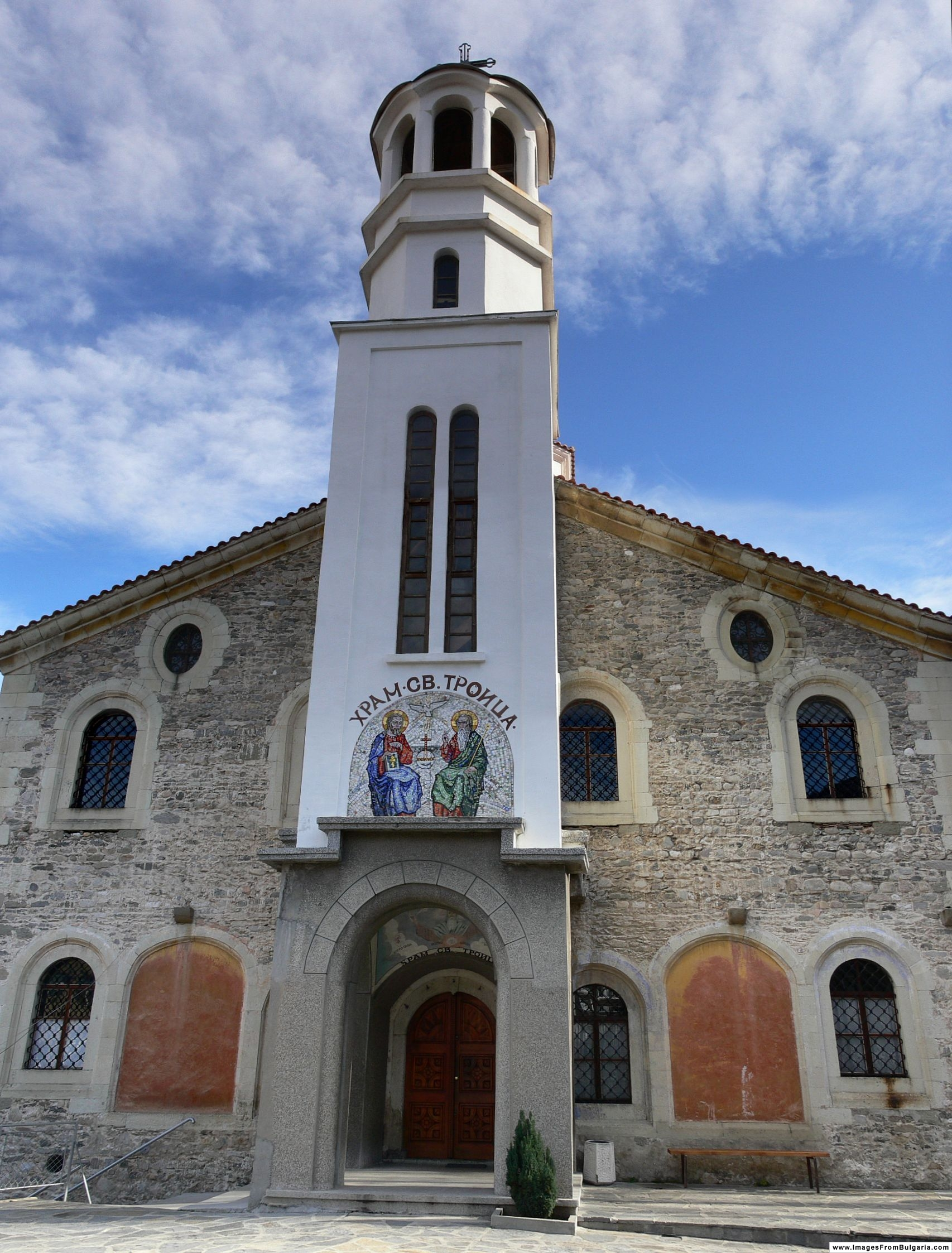
Church of the Holy Trinity (built 1857–1862)

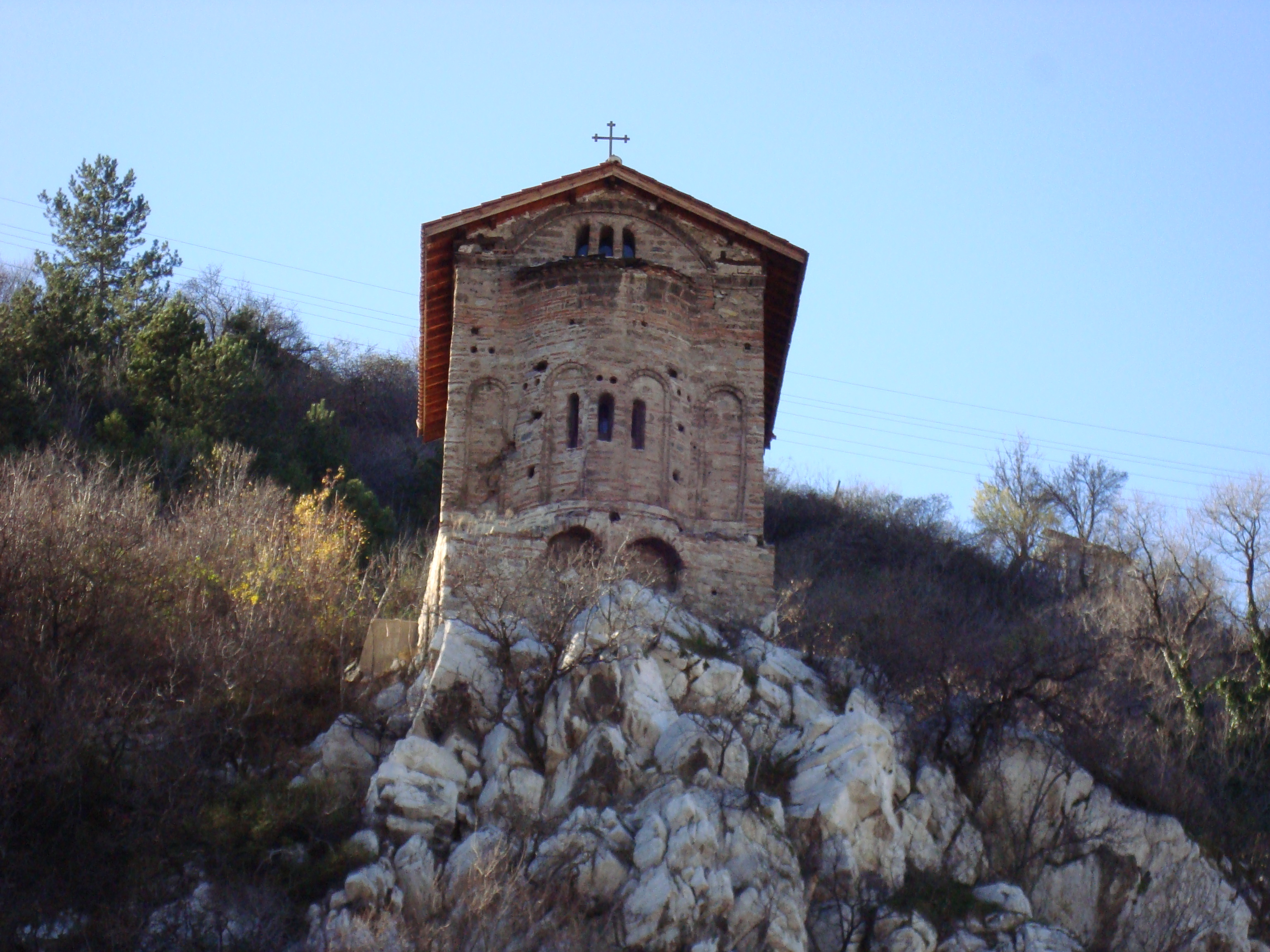
Medieval Church of St John the Baptist overlooking the city

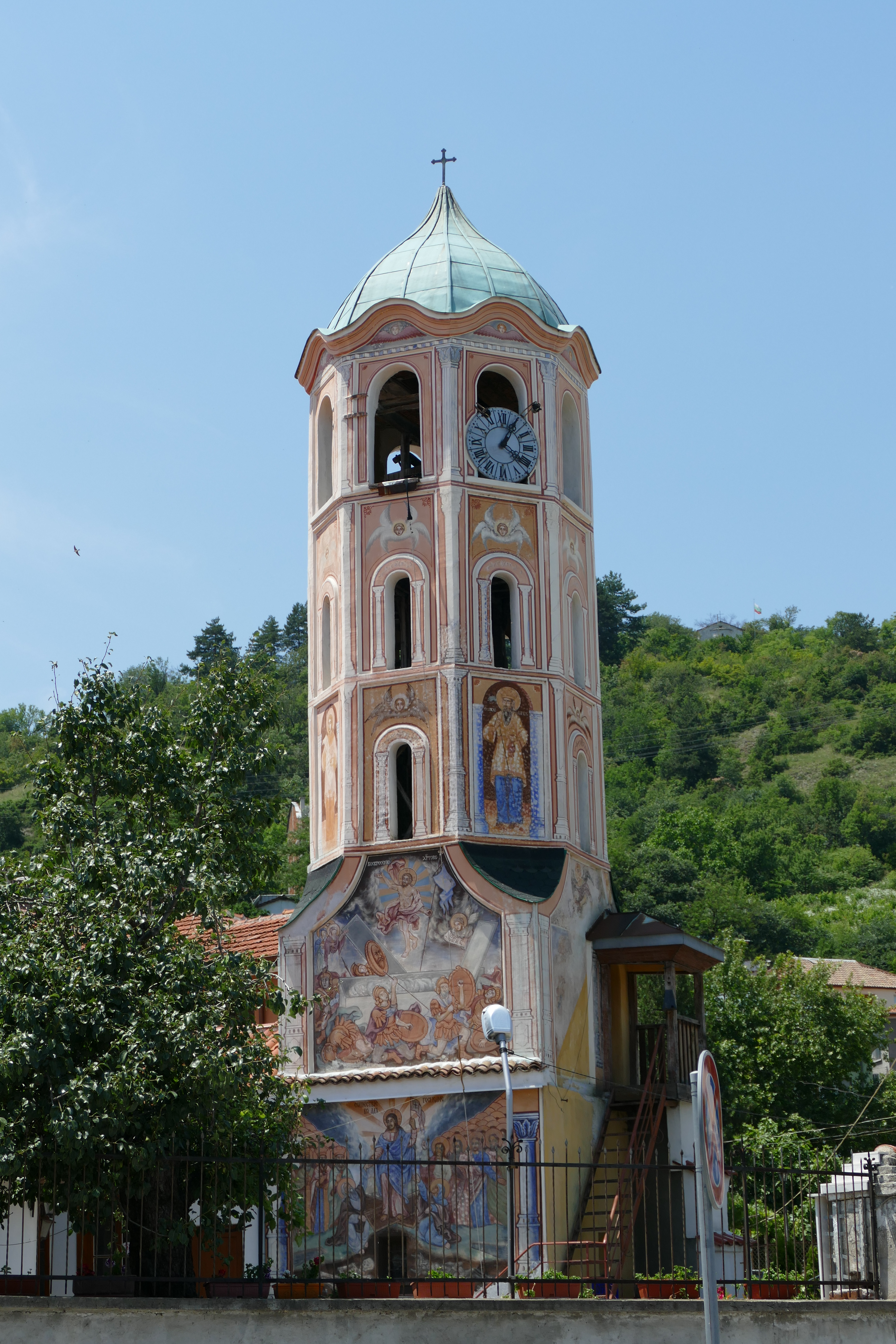
Church of the Assumption decorated with murals
