= Asen's Fortress =

Medieval fortress in the Bulgarian Rhodope Mountains

- Асенова крепост
- Plovdiv Province, Bulgaria
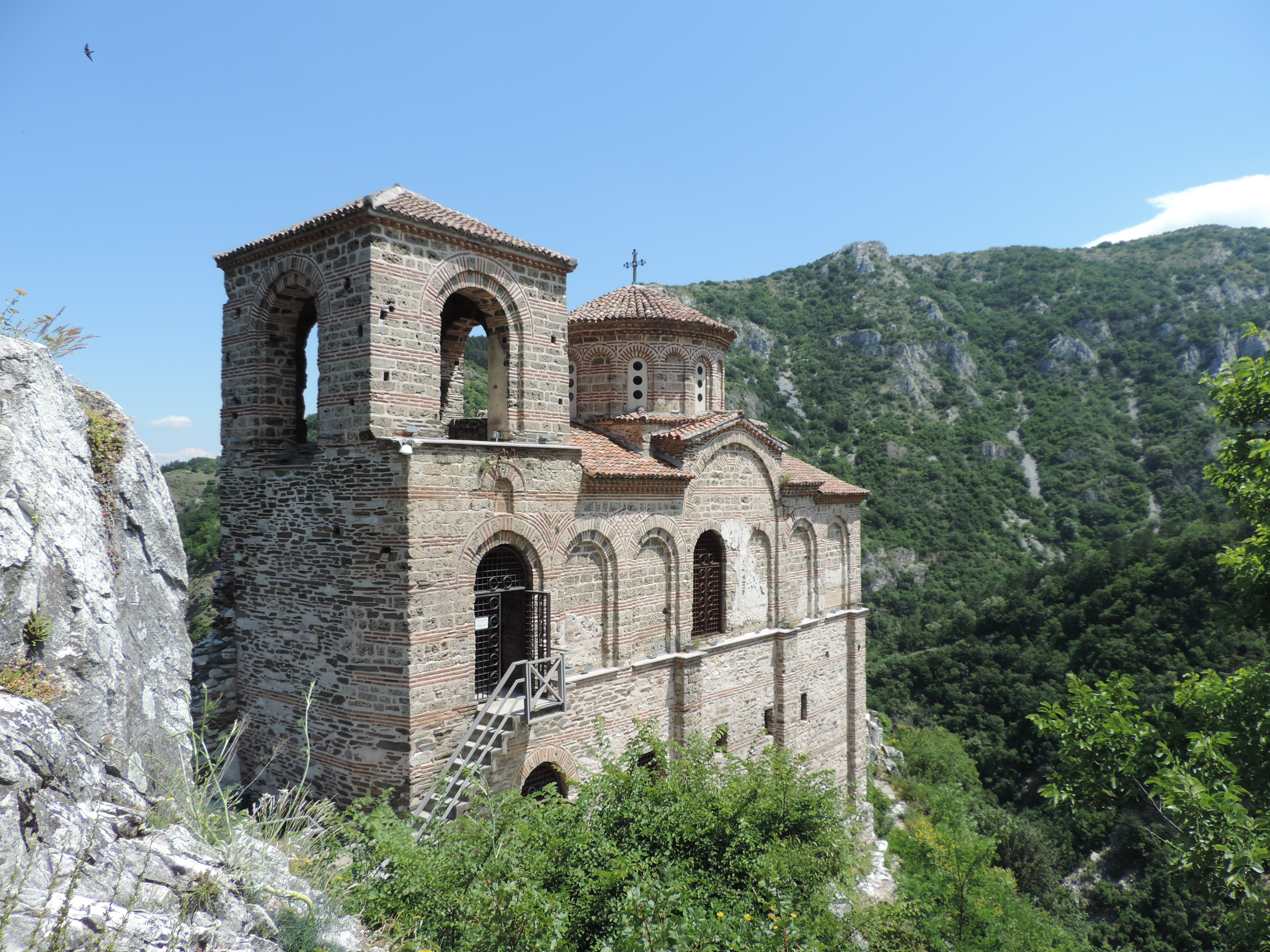
- The Church of the Holy Mother of God in the fortress.

Site information
- Condition: In ruins

Location
- Coordinates: 41°59′12″N 24°52′24″E

Site history
- Events: Byzantine–Bulgarian Wars

Asen's Fortress (Bulgarian: Асенова крепост, romanized: Asenova krepost), identified by some researchers as Petrich (Петрич), is a medieval fortress in the Bulgarian Rhodope Mountains, 2 to 3 kilometres (1.2 to 1.9 mi) south of the town of Asenovgrad, on a high rocky ridge on the left bank of the Asenitsa River. Asen's Fortress is 279 metres (915 ft) above sea level. It is located in the Asenovgrad Municipality of Plovdiv Province.

== History ==
The earliest archaeological findings date from the time of the Thracians, the area of the fortress being also inhabited during the Ancient Roman and Early Byzantine period. The fortress gained importance in the Middle Ages, first mentioned in the statute of the Bachkovo Monastery as Petrich in the 11th century. The fortress was conquered by the armies of the Third Crusade.

In 1205 the Latin Duke of Philippopolis, Renier of Trit, fled from Philippopolis, which was under pressure from Tsar Kaloyan of Bulgaria, and took refuge in Asen's Fortress (at the time called Stanimaka). Renier of Trit would be besieged in the fortress for eleven months with just 40 knights before being relieved by the army of Latin Emperor Henry of Flanders.

It was considerably renovated in the 13th century (more precisely 1231) during the rule of Bulgarian tsar Ivan Asen II to serve as a border fortification against Latin raids, as evidenced by an eight-line wall inscription. The foundations of fortified walls—the outer ones being 2.9 metres (9.5 ft) thick and preserved up to a height of 3 metres (10 ft), originally 9 to 12 metres (30 to 39 ft) high—a feudal castle, 30 rooms and 3 water repositories have been excavated from this period.

The best preserved and most notable feature of Asen's Fortress is the Church of the Holy Mother of God from the 12th-13th century. It is a two-storey cross-domed single-naved building with a wide narthex and a large rectangular tower, and features mural paintings from the 14th century. The conservation and partial restoration works on the church were finished in 1991 (the whole fortress was left to decay after the Ottoman conquest in the 14th century and only the church remained standing in its original appearance as it was used by the local Christians) and now it is in regular use as a Bulgarian Orthodox church.

In the following years after Ivan Assen II's death the castle switched hands between the Bulgarians and Byzantines for decades. The fortress was once again in Bulgarian hands at the time of Ivan Alexander in 1344 only to be conquered and destroyed by the Ottomans during their rule of Bulgaria.

The town of Asenovgrad, formerly called Stanimaka, takes its modern name from the fortress.

== Gallery ==
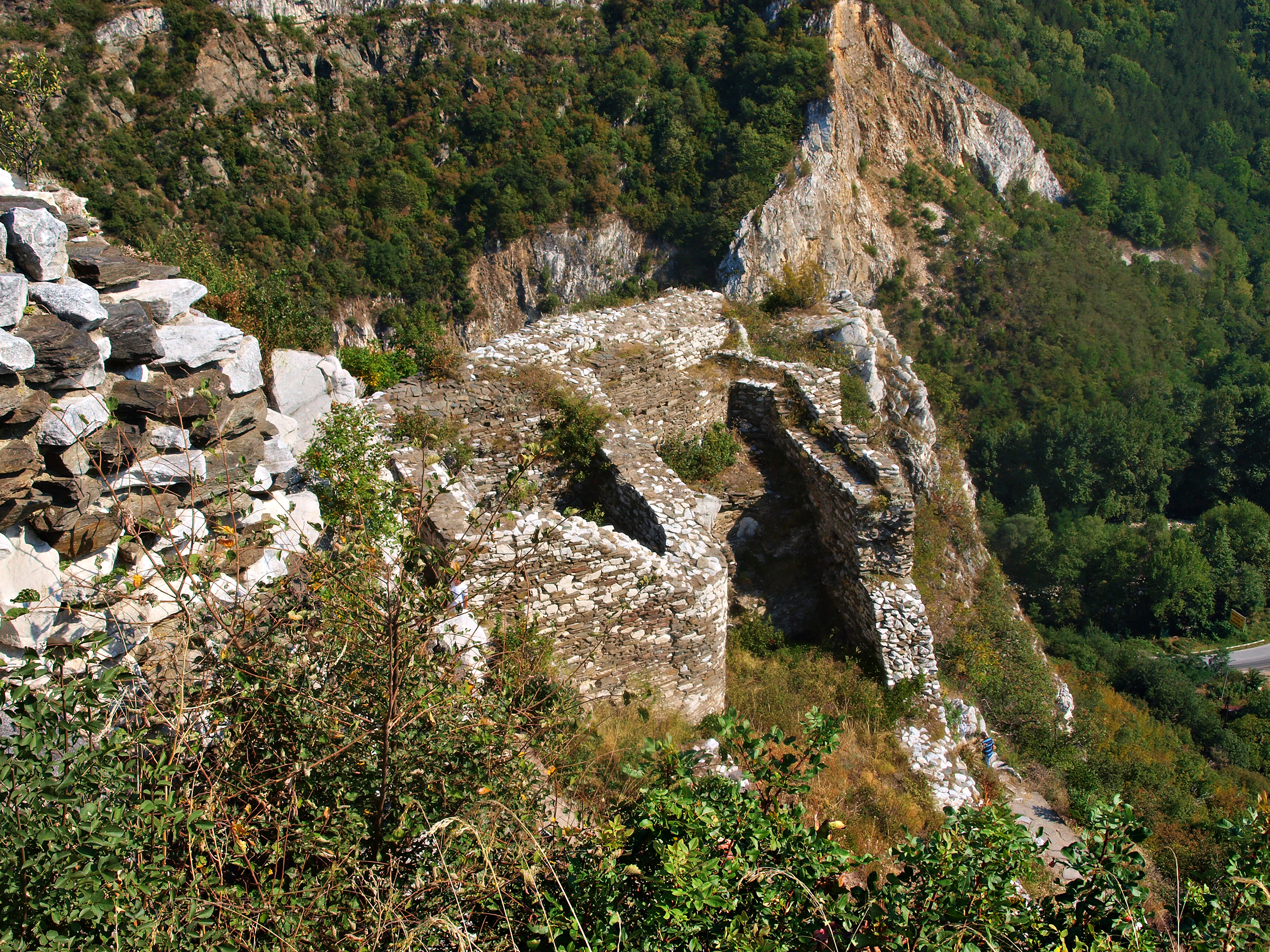
Part of the walls.

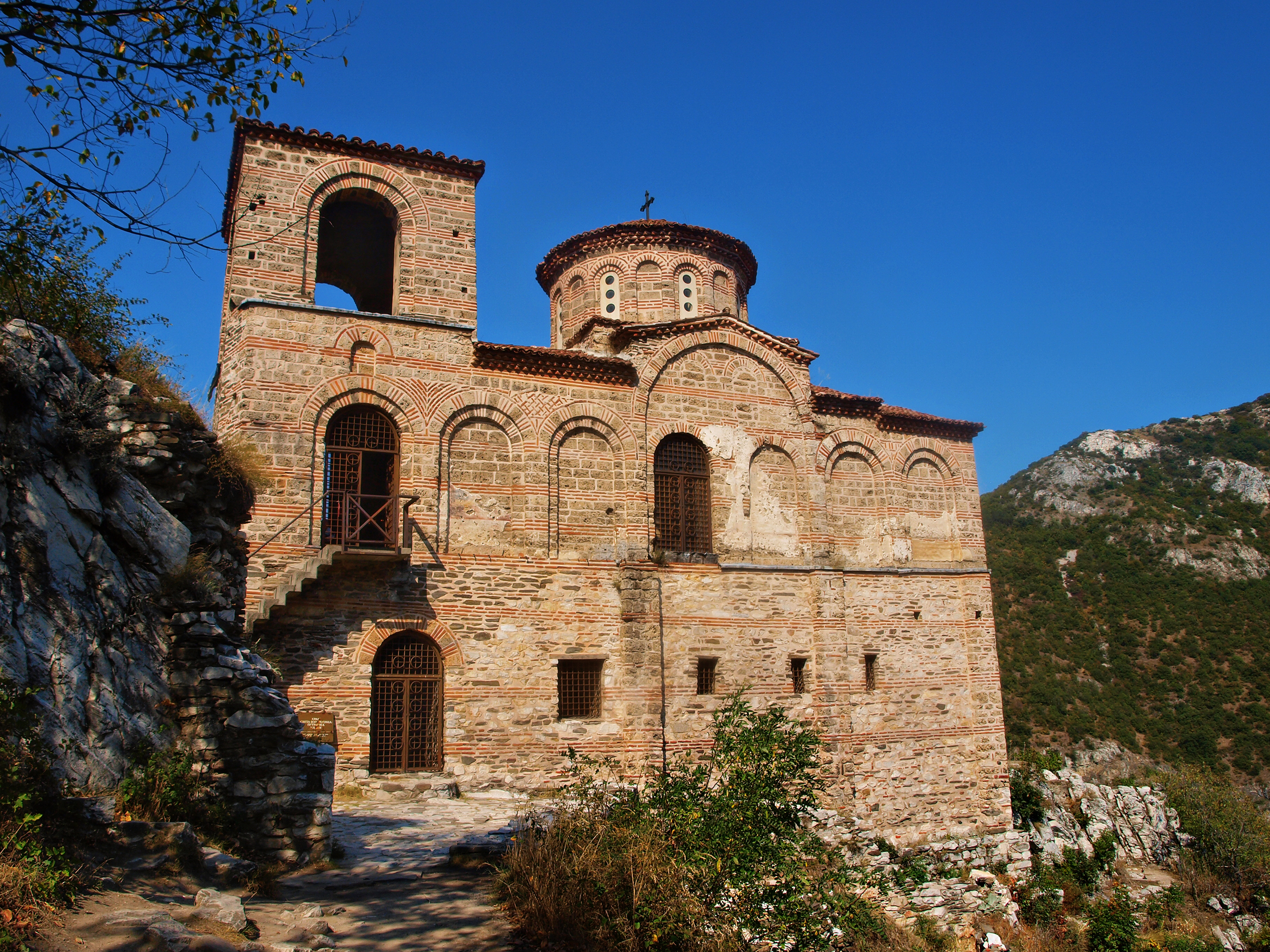
Front view of the church.

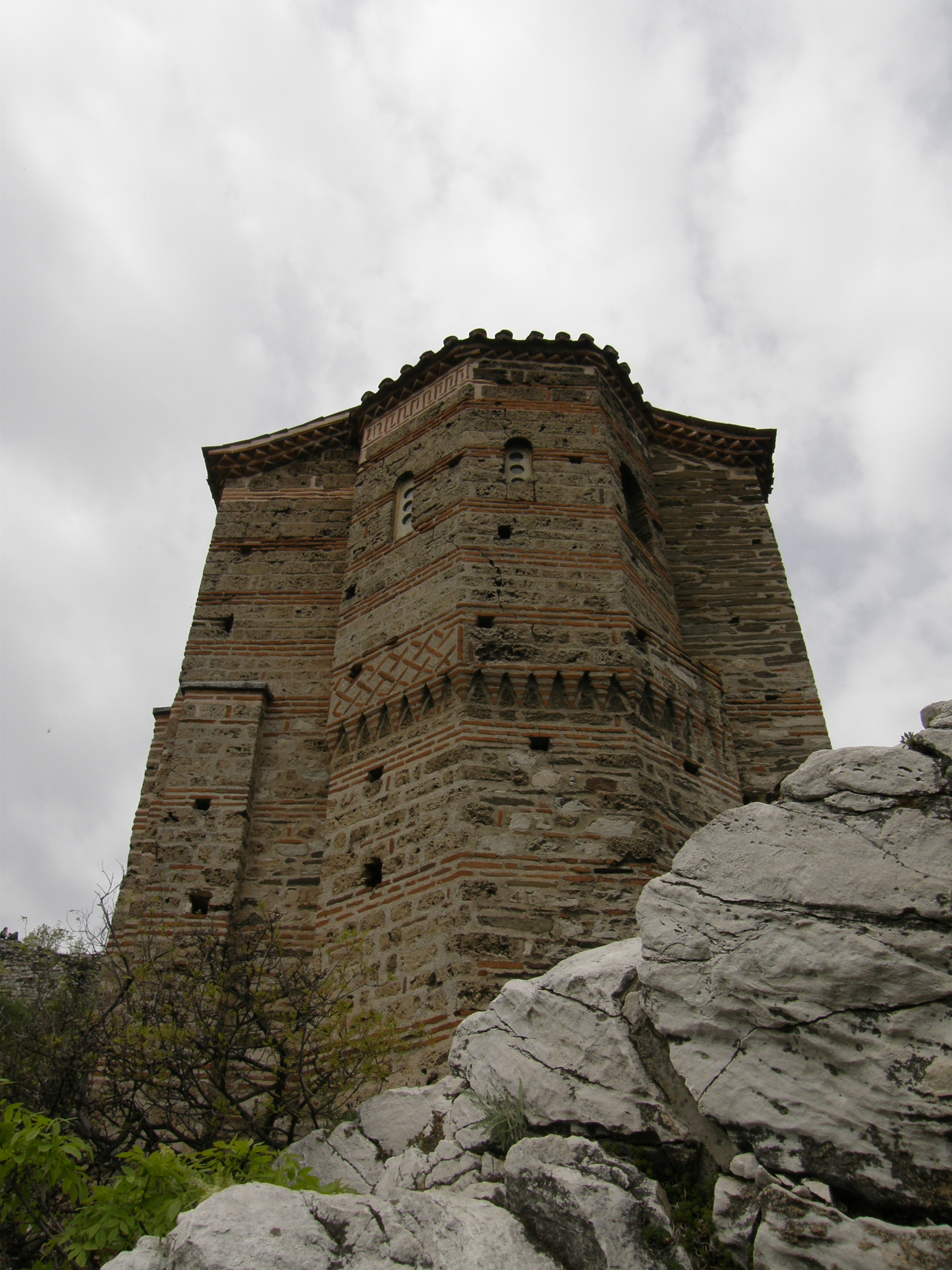
Apse view of the church.

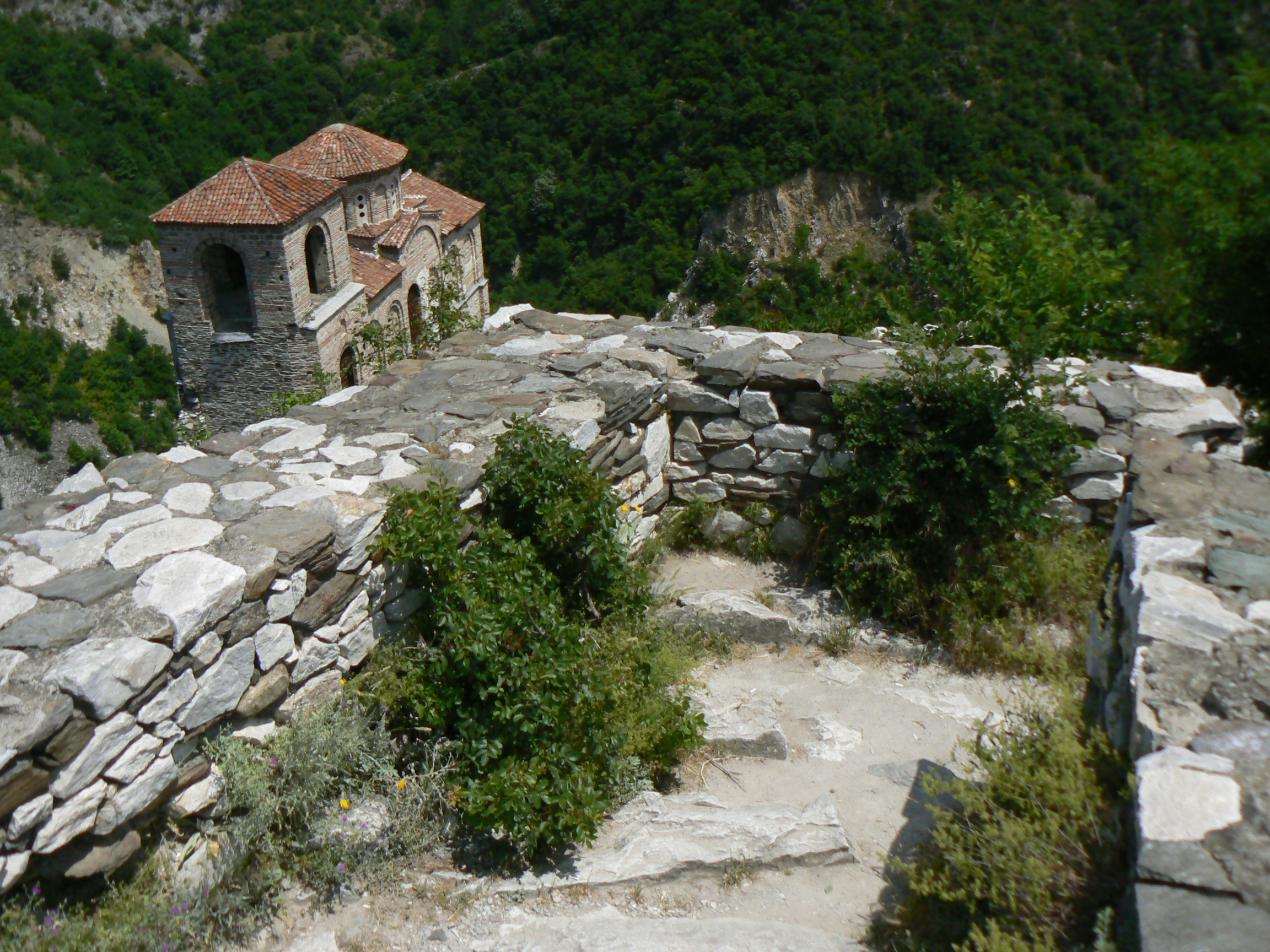
The church from the ruins of the tower.

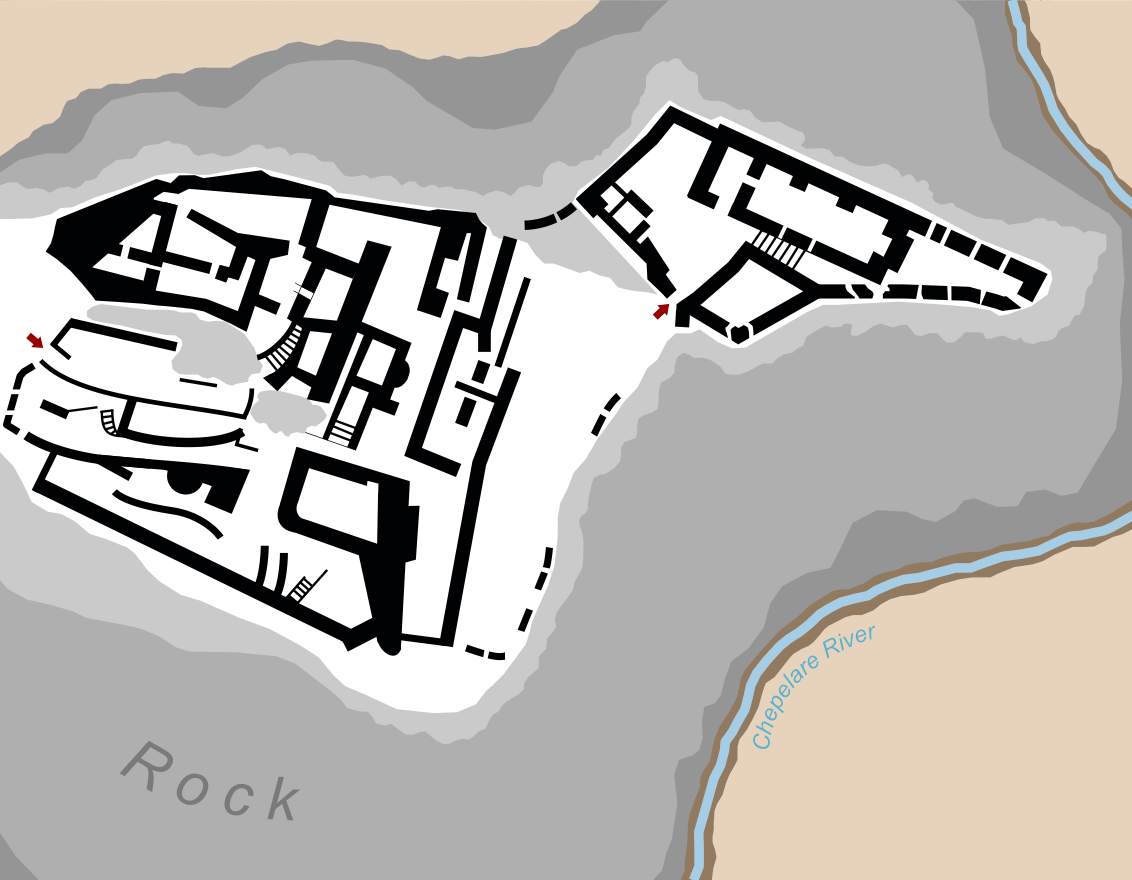
Plan of the fortress.

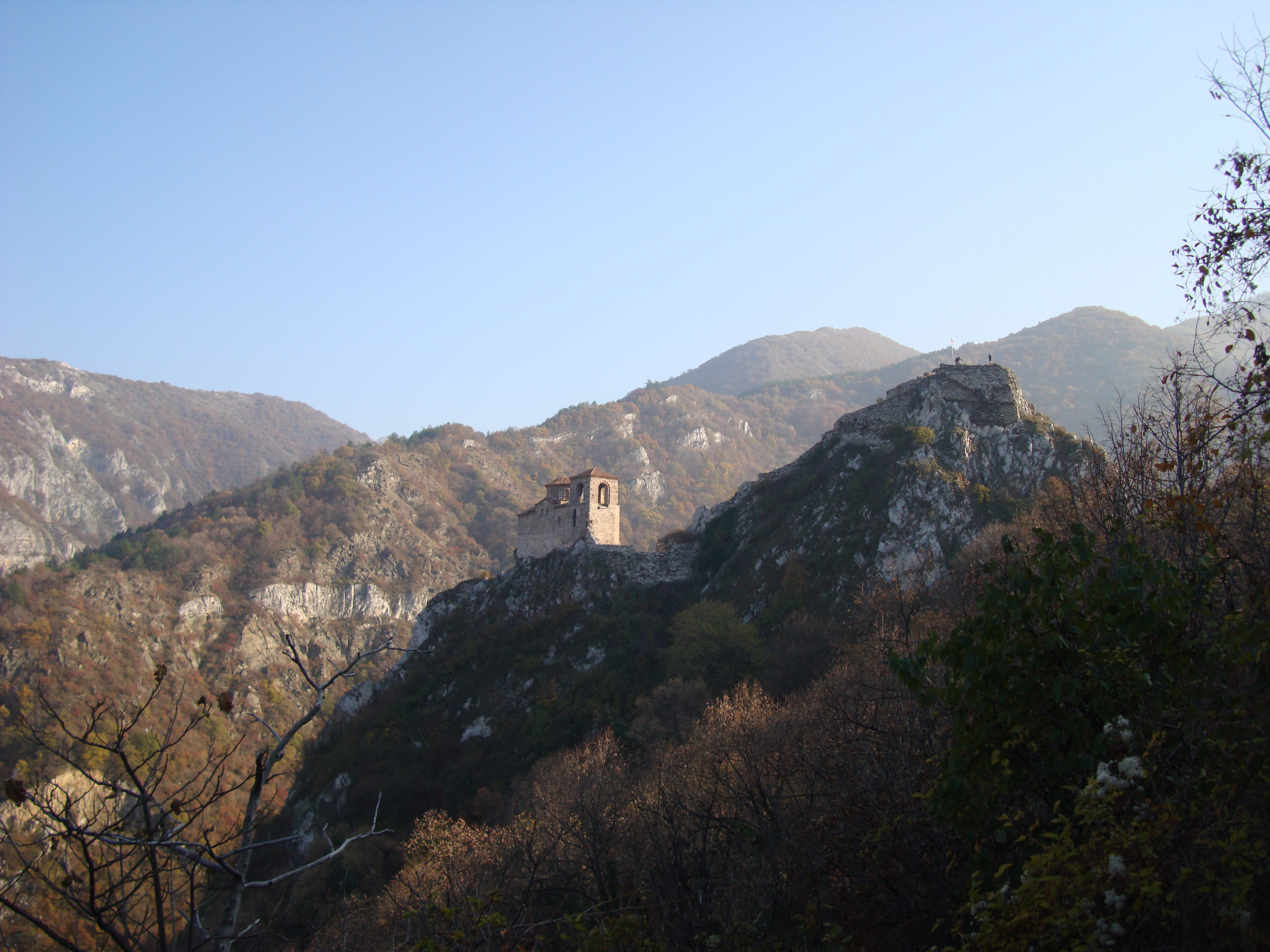
Asen's Fortress seen from the road to the fortress

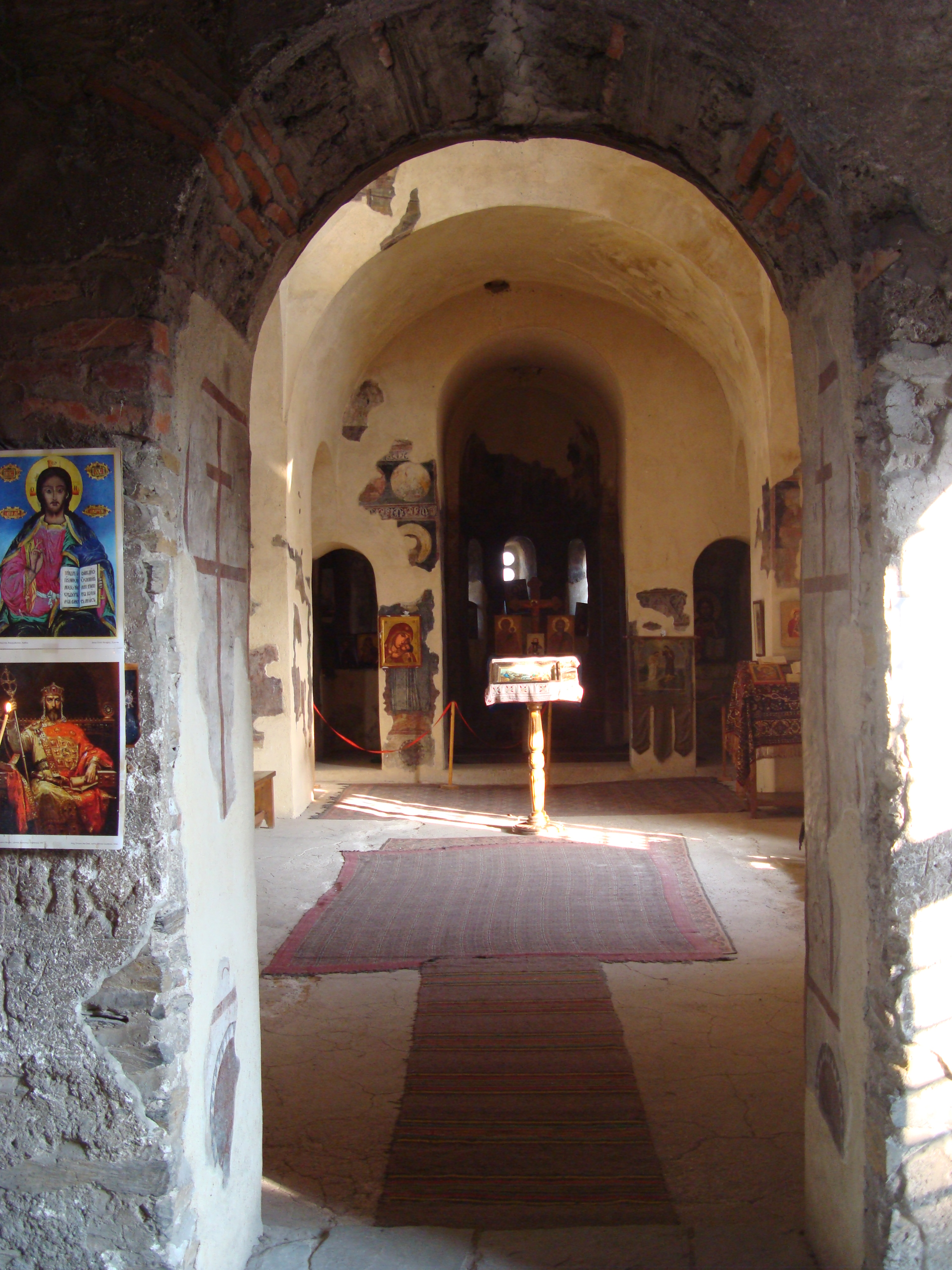
Inside of the church at Asen's Fortress

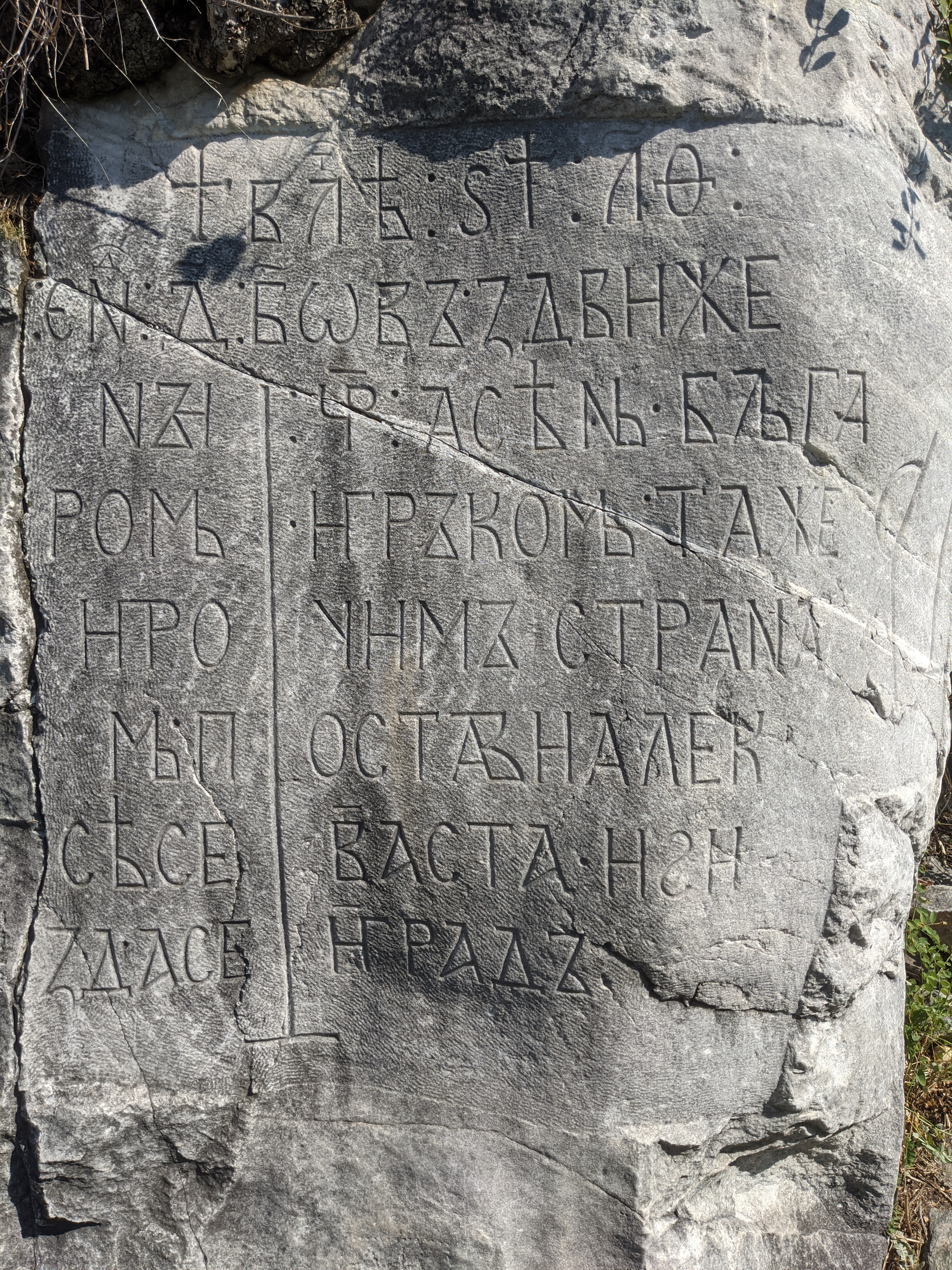
8 line inscription outside Asen's Fortress
