= Church of the Holy Mother of God, Asen's Fortress =

Medieval Eastern Orthodox church in Bulgaria

Coordinates: 41°59′12″N 24°52′24″E

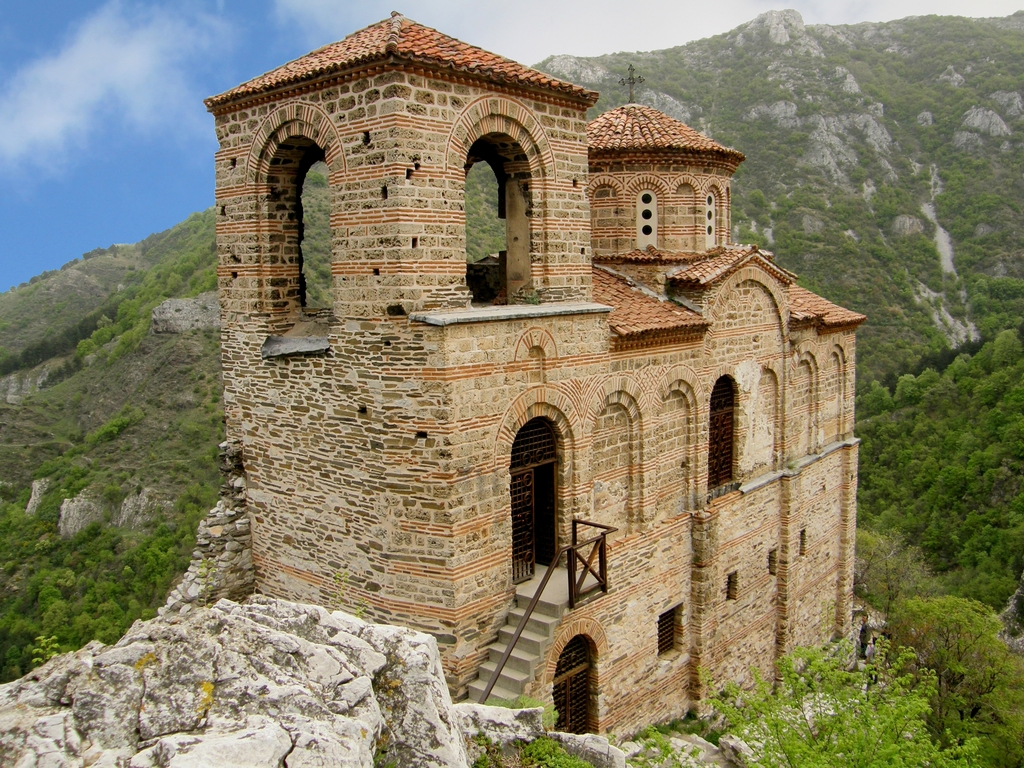
The Church of the Holy Mother of God in Asen's Fortress

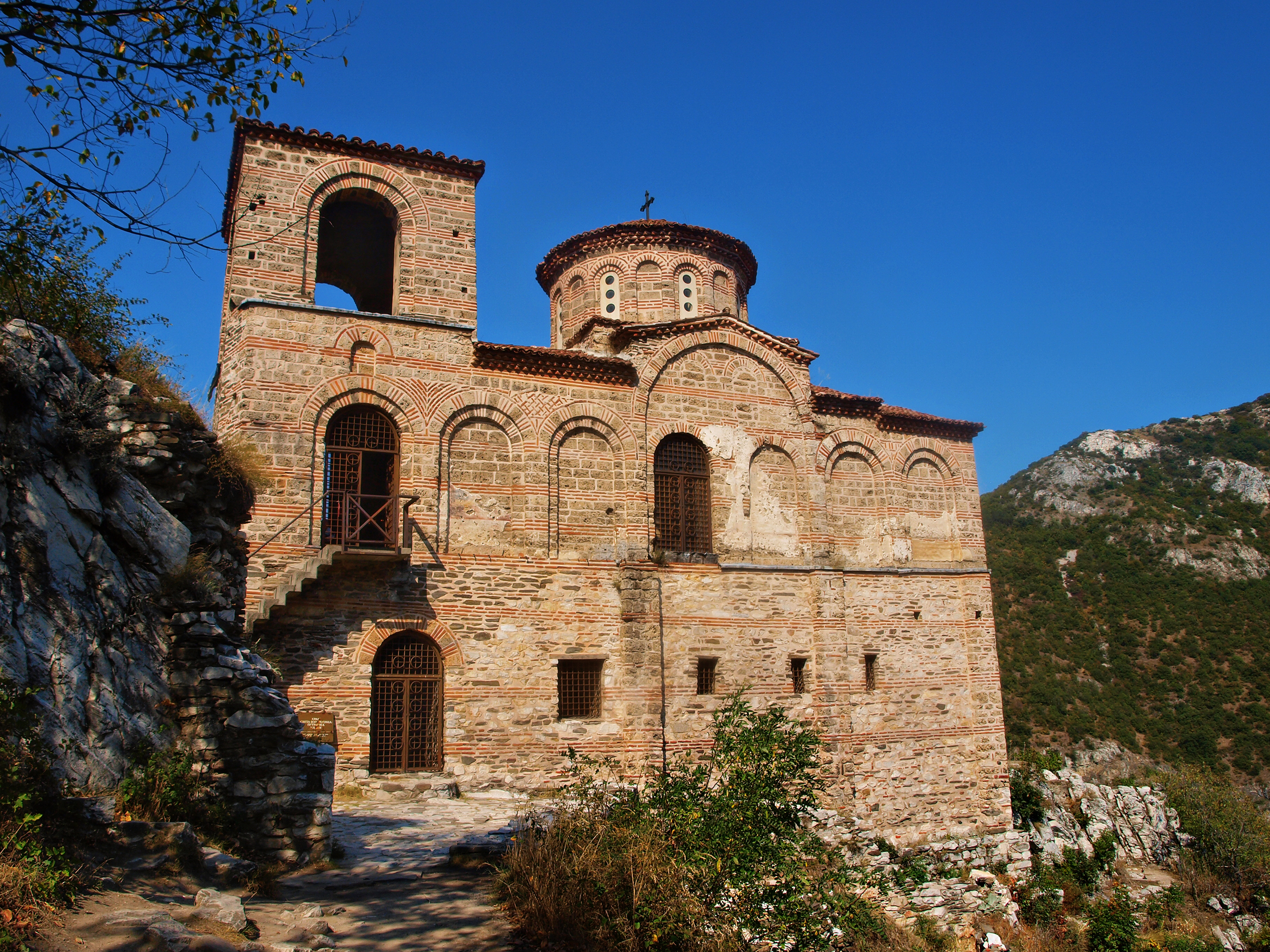
Front view

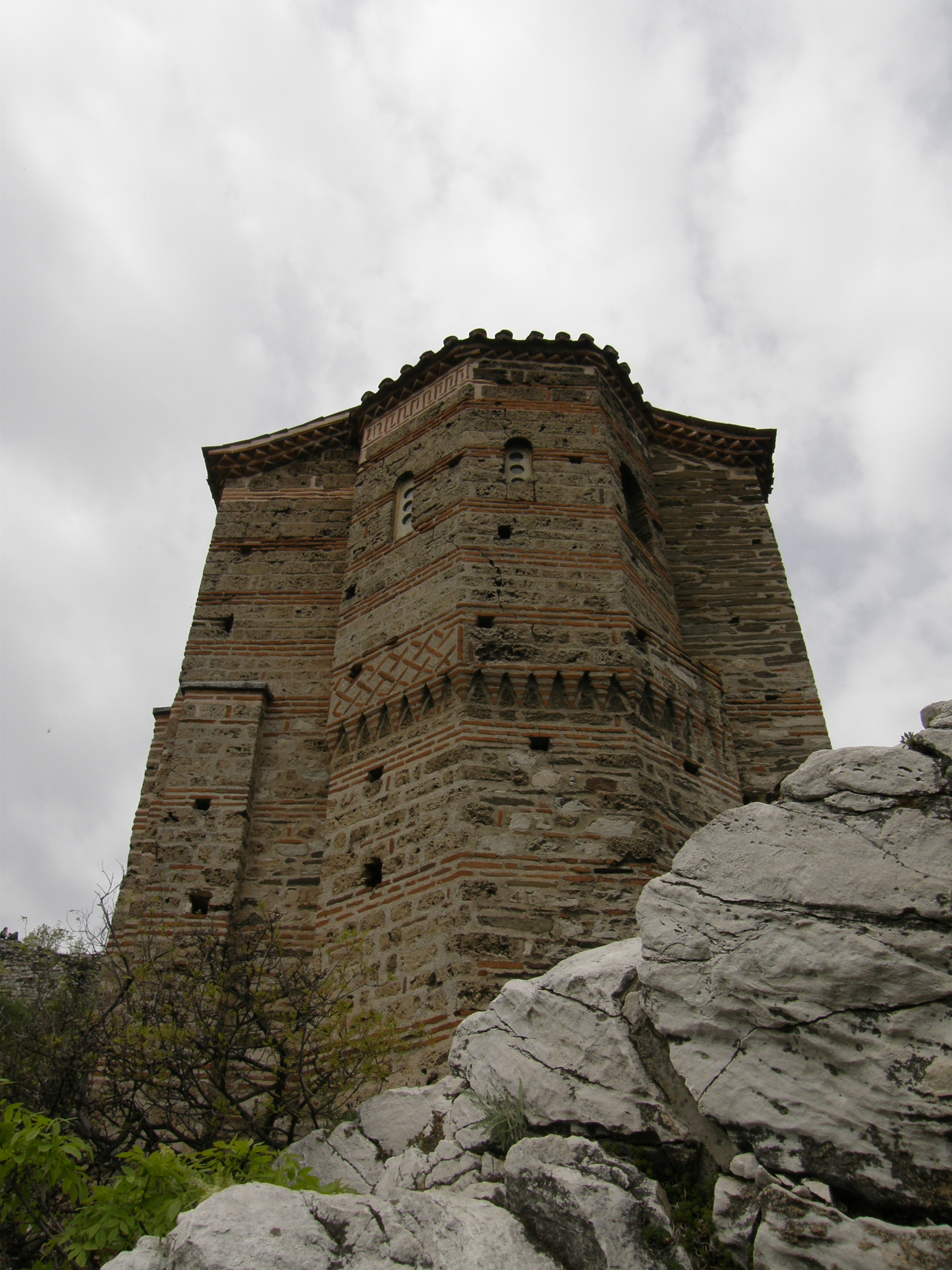
Apse view

The Church of the Holy Mother of God (Bulgarian: църква "Света Богородица", tsarkva "Sveta Bogoroditsa") is the popular name of a medieval Eastern Orthodox church located in Asen's Fortress. It lies near Asenovgrad in the Rhodope Mountains of Plovdiv Province, south central Bulgaria. Constructed most likely in the 12th century, it features two stories, of which the upper story is the church proper and the lower story is of unclear function. The rectangular tower over the church's narthex is regarded as the earliest preserved of its kind in the Balkans. Fragments of frescoes are visible on the walls of the church's upper story.

== Location and history ==
The Church of the Holy Mother of God lies on an elevation near the second class II-86 road from Plovdiv to Smolyan, 2 kilometres (1.2 mi) south of the town of Asenovgrad (medieval Stenimachos), part of Asenovgrad Municipality of Plovdiv Province. It forms part of a now mostly ruined castle known as Asen's Fortress, of which the church is the best preserved building. The church is dated by most scholars to the 12th century; however, some researchers place its construction in the 11th century and a few others in the 13th century.

Though the church is commonly known as the Church of the Holy Mother of God, this may well not have been its actual name. The dedication is alleged based on a partial Medieval Greek inscription in the church, which may have been a donor's inscription. In the early 20th century, the part of the inscription that was still visible was deciphered as "ή παναγία τῆς Πετριζηώτης", equivalent to "or the Mother of God of Petrich". However, this was the name of the main church (katholikon) of the nearby Bachkovo Monastery, which makes it more likely that the inscription references the monastery and its relation to the church in Asen's Fortress in some way, rather than providing the name of the church.

At the turn of the 20th century, the Church of the Holy Mother of God was the terminus of two rival religious processions organised by the ethnic Greek and Bulgarian communities of Asenovgrad. A Greek procession took place in 1899 and a comparable Bulgarian one was carried out several years later. These processions began after a man claimed to have seen lights and heard chants while passing near the then-abandoned church. Both processions ended with a Divine Liturgy observed at night by the church.

After suffering damage during an earthquake in 1904, the church was reconstructed by a team directed by architect Aleksandar Rashenov in 1936. As of 2008, it continues to function as a place of worship.

== Architecture ==
The Church of the Holy Mother of God measures approximately 18 metres (59 ft) in length, 7 metres (23 ft) in width and 12 metres (39 ft) in height (over 15 metres (49 ft) according to other data). The walls of the church were constructed out of interchanging bands of stones and three rows of brickwork tied together with mortar. An exception is the north wall, which was built almost exclusively of stones, with only a single band of bricks. The walls vary from 0.85 to 1.15 m (2.8 to 3.8 ft) in thickness.

The church features two stories: while the upper story was certainly the church proper and the place of liturgy, the role of the lower story is unclear. Its construction may have been necessitated due to the unfavourable rocky terrain, or it may have served as a tomb or a storage facility. The latter is considered more likely because no human remains have been discovered inside, even though the lower stories of similar churches were commonly used as tombs.

The church has a single elongated nave. It is surmounted by a dome and finishes with a single apse in its eastern part. The dome is supported by arches to the north and south and vaults to the west and east. The apse is five-sided on the outside and round on the inside. To the west of it is the sanctuary which features three vaults which hosted the bema, the prothesis and the diaconicon. The sanctuary was separated from the rest of the nave via two pillars. Three buttresses support the south wall and the apse. The entrance to the church is on the south wall. The church has a total of 16 windows: three on the apse, one on the south wall, four on the north wall and one on the narthex.

To the west of the nave is a small narthex, which is topped by an unusual rectangular tower. The tower was used either as a bell tower or watchtower, or possibly both. It was accessible via wooden ladders on the inside and the outside. It features four wide vaulted windows in its upper part and a rectangular dome covered with roof tiles. According to art historian Robert G. Ousterhout, the tower of the Church of the Holy Mother of God is the earliest example of a belfry integrated into a church building and arranged above the narthex in Balkan architecture. This design would later establish itself as standard in the Balkans. The construction of an integrated tower has been attributed to either Western European or oriental (Syriac or Armenian) influences.

== Decoration ==
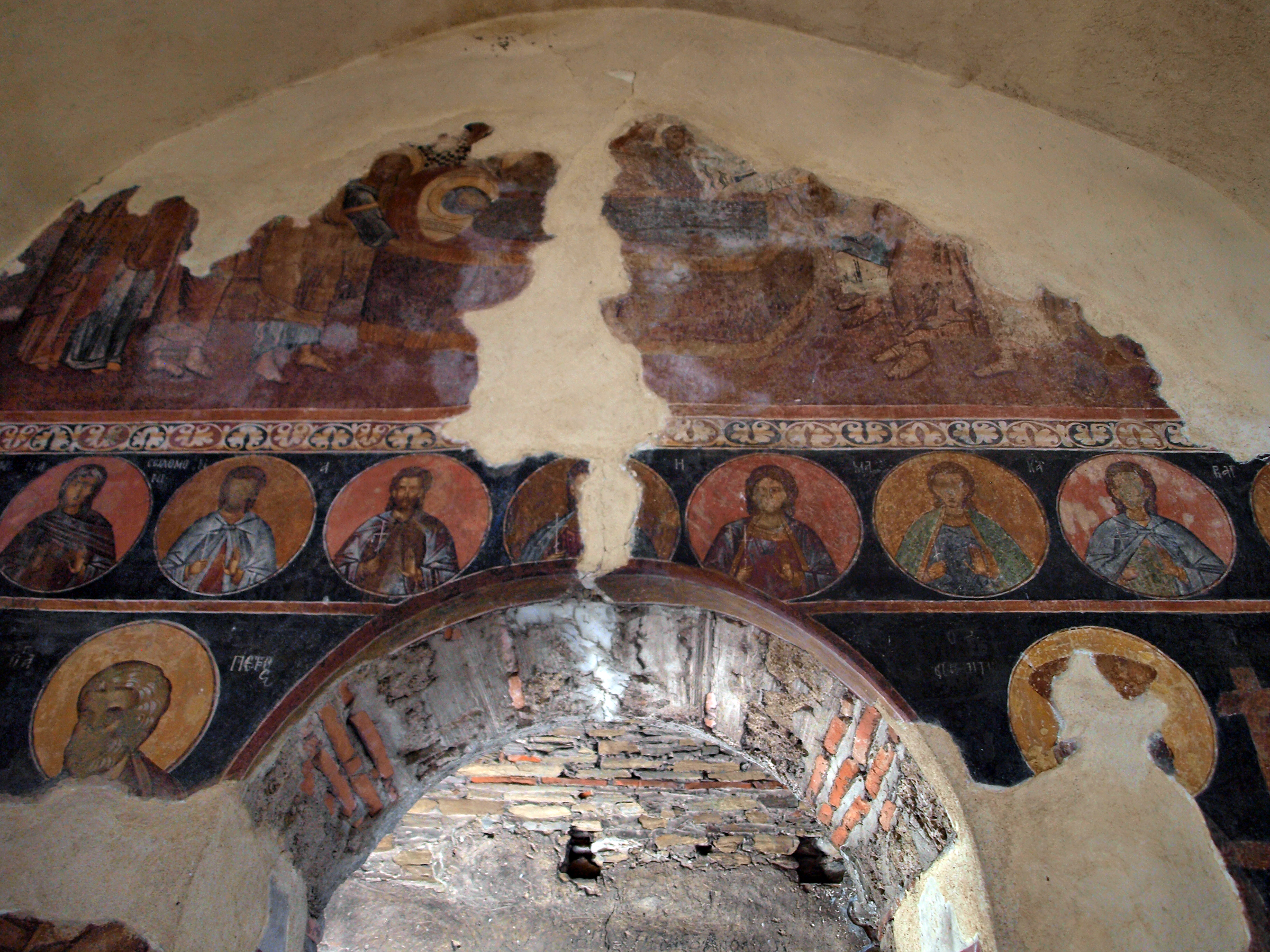
Remnants of frescoes above the nave entrance

The church's exterior appearance has been described as "harmonic", "graceful" and "proportionate". The Church of the Holy Mother of God is richly decorated on the outside. Blind arches, a design element very typical for medieval Bulgarian architecture, feature prominently on the south facade and the dome. A large arch on the south wall ties together the lower and upper story. The apse is particularly richly decorated. Besides rows of elongated bricks, it also includes triangular shapes and lattice patterns above, both made of red bricks.

The church's upper story features fragments of frescoes, mostly on the interior, though there are traces of mural painting on one of the blind arches as well. The interior includes images of the Baptism of Christ, Pilate's Court, the Dormition of the Mother of God and the Crucifixion of Jesus. Among the portraits of saints that can be recognised are John the Baptist, the apostles Peter and Paul, Constantine and Helena and the Forty Martyrs of Sebaste. Military saints were depicted on the south wall, while the north wall mostly features monks. All of the preserved frescoes were done in the 14th century and are an example of Palaiologan art. All captions to the frescoes are in Medieval Greek.
