= Great Basilica, Pliska =

Church building in Pliska, Bulgaria

Coordinates: 43°23′55″N 27°8′20″E

The Great Basilica of Pliska (Bulgarian: Голяма базилика в Плиска, romanized: Golyama bazilika v Pliska) is an architectural complex in Pliska, the first capital of the First Bulgarian Empire, which includes the cathedral, an archbishop's palace and a monastery. The basilica was constructed on the orders of the knyaz of Bulgaria, Boris I (r. 852–889), after his baptism in 864 and the resultant Christianization of Bulgaria. Completed around 875, the basilica was 102.5 metres (336 ft) long and 30 metres (98 ft) wide.

The complex includes Great Basilica itself – a basilica used as the cathedral church – and the attached monastery and episcopal palace inhabited by Christian monks and the bishop of Pliska.

== Description ==
The basilica was built at the place of what is known as the cross-shaped Mausoleum, an older religious building that is thought by some researchers to be an unknown kind of Bulgar heathen temple. According to the Shumen architectural museum's research, an early Christian martyrium that included a cross-shaped church and a holy spring also existed at that place. The martyr buried there is thought to be Enravota, the first Bulgarian saint. The martyrium is thought to have been destroyed in 865 during the failed rebellion of the heathens in the wake of the Christianization of Bulgaria. Other researchers, however, regard the cross-shaped remains as a mausoleum of early Bulgarian rulers.

The archbishop's residence lay to the north and south of the basilica: the northern yard hosted a residential building, with a bath with a hypocaust lay to the west of it. The building to the south of the cathedral accommodated a school and a scriptorium. Two necropoleis are located in the vicinity of the complex: a monastic necropolis lies to the southwest of the church, while a secular one intended for nobles was unearthed in front of the basilica's apse. The yard north of the basilica also accommodated monastic buildings with a kitchen and a dining room. The eastern part of the yard was allocated for a residential building with ten identical monastic cells. Another bath with a hypocaust, a cross-shaped one, and a well lay in the centre of that yard.

== History ==
Pliska was the first capital of Bulgaria, and according to legend founded by Asparuh of Bulgaria in the late 7th century; this legend is archaeologically unsubstantiated. The site was originally an encampment, with the first tent-shaped buildings at Pliska of uncertain date. No evidence exists of a settlement before the 9th century, and claims that the site dates from Late Antiquity have been contested. By the early 9th century, Pliska was surrounded by a defensive wall and 2,300 hectares (5,700 acres) of land was further enclosed by an outer earthwork with stone revetment 21 kilometres (13 miles) long.

After the Byzantine army sacked and burned Pliska in 811, led by the emperor Nikephoros I (r. 802–811), Pliska was rebuilt by Omurtag (r. 814–831), who used spolia from nearby Roman buildings and employing late Roman-inspired rectilinear and basilica plans in the architecture of his new ashlar palace, which descended from Late Antique prototypes like Diocletian's Palace at Split, Croatia. When Boris I (r. 852–889) converted to Christianity in 864, the religious buildings of Pliska were adapted for Christian use and it was after this point that the Great Basilica was constructed, together with a monastery which was attached to it. The monastery was home to the disciples of Saints Cyril and Methodius.

After the tsar Simeon I founded his new capital at Preslav, Pliska was slowly abandoned. It was captured at the turn of the 2nd millennium by Theodorokanos and Nikephoros Xiphias, during the campaigns of the emperor Basil the Bulgar-Slayer (r. 960–1025), which ended the First Bulgarian Empire.

== Gallery ==
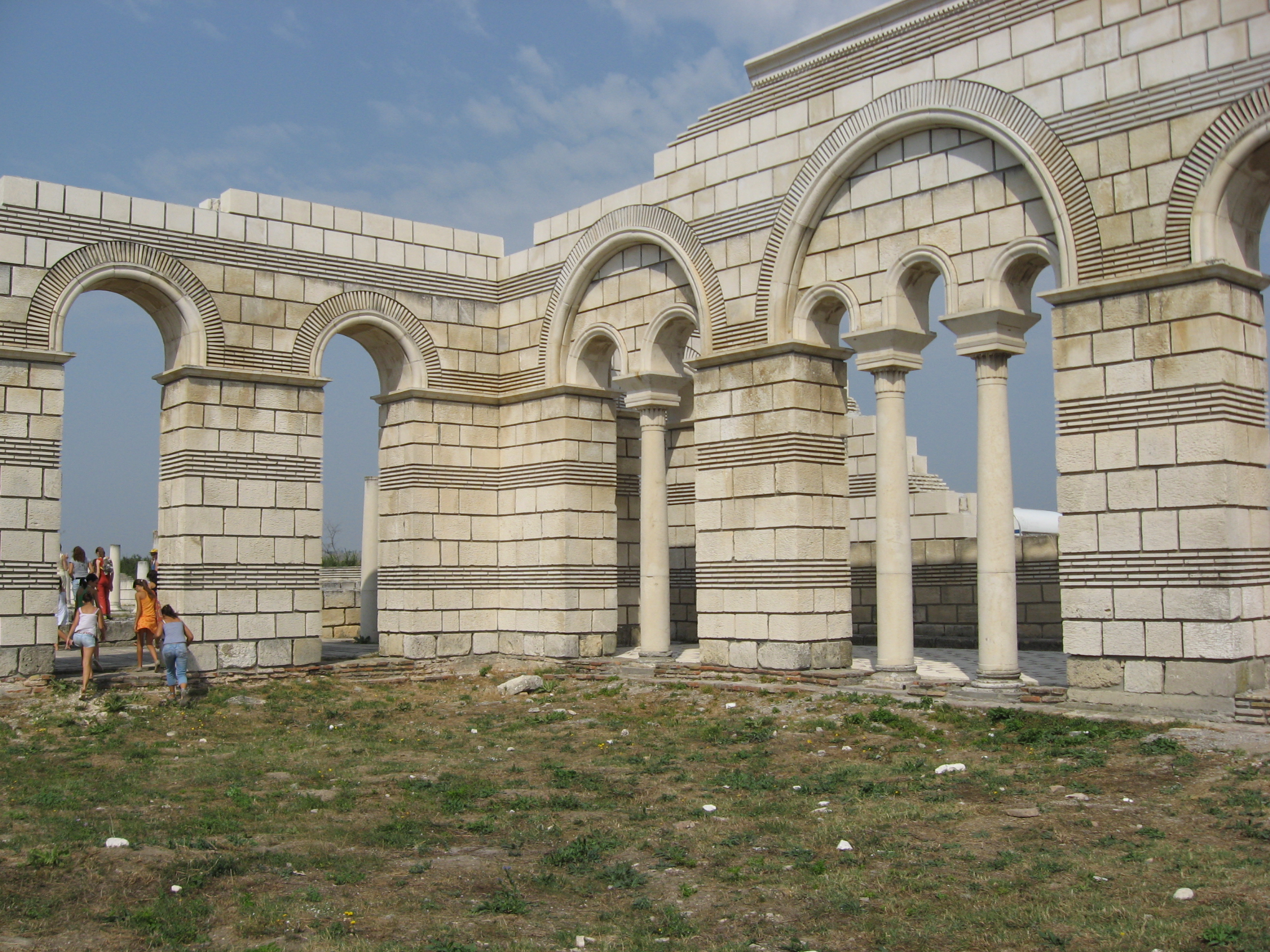
The basilica

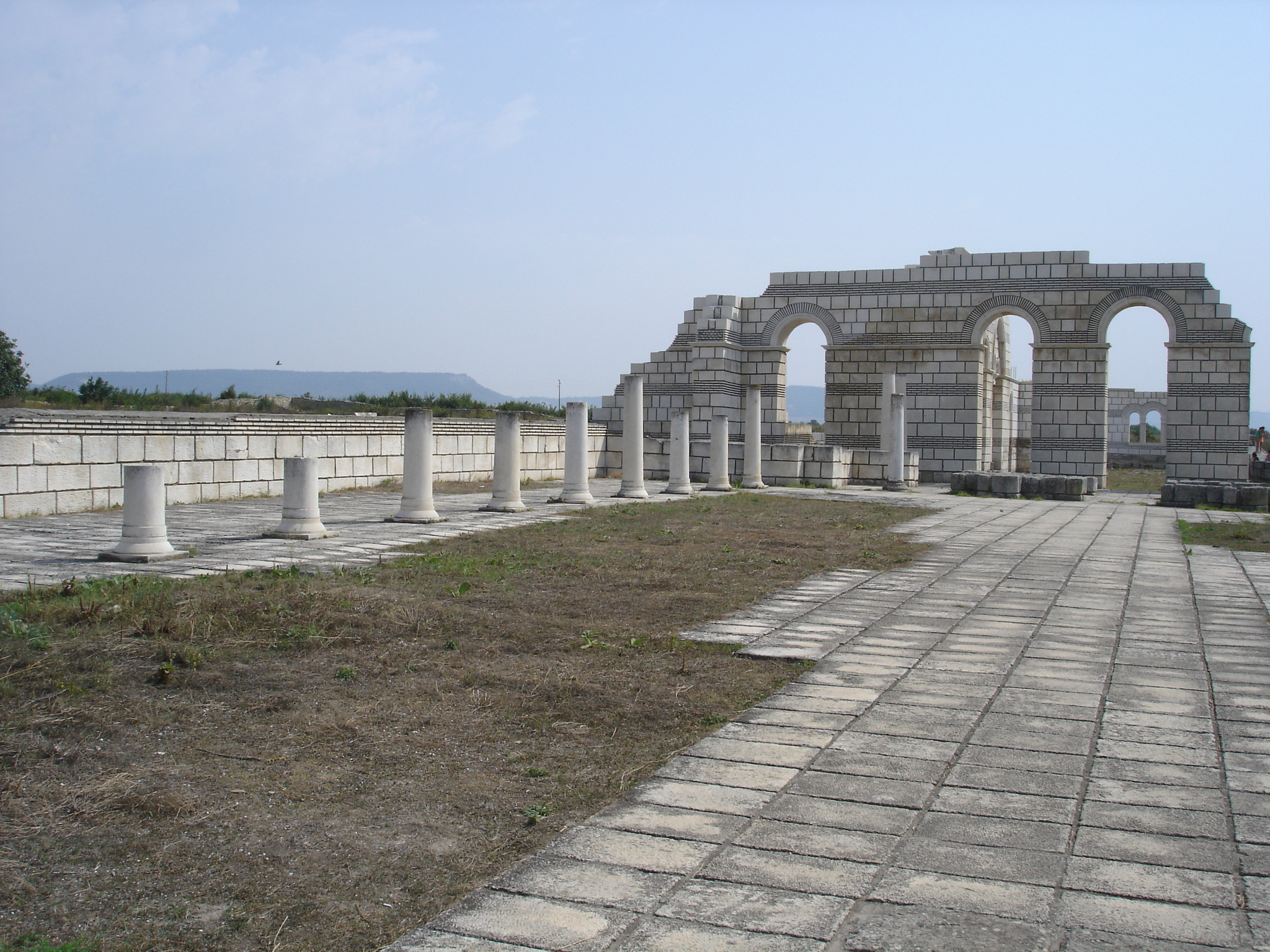
The basilica's narthex

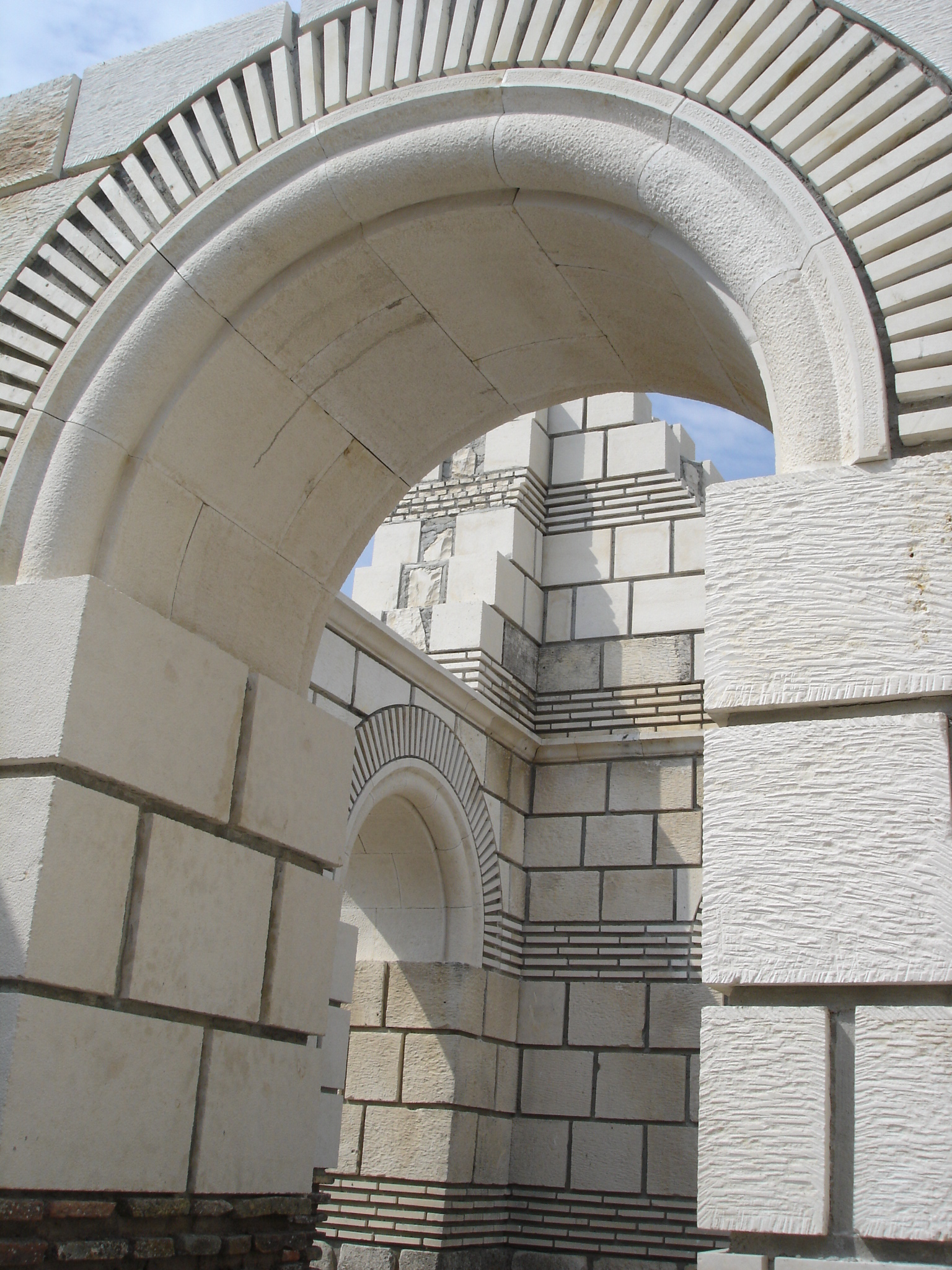
Left part of the altar

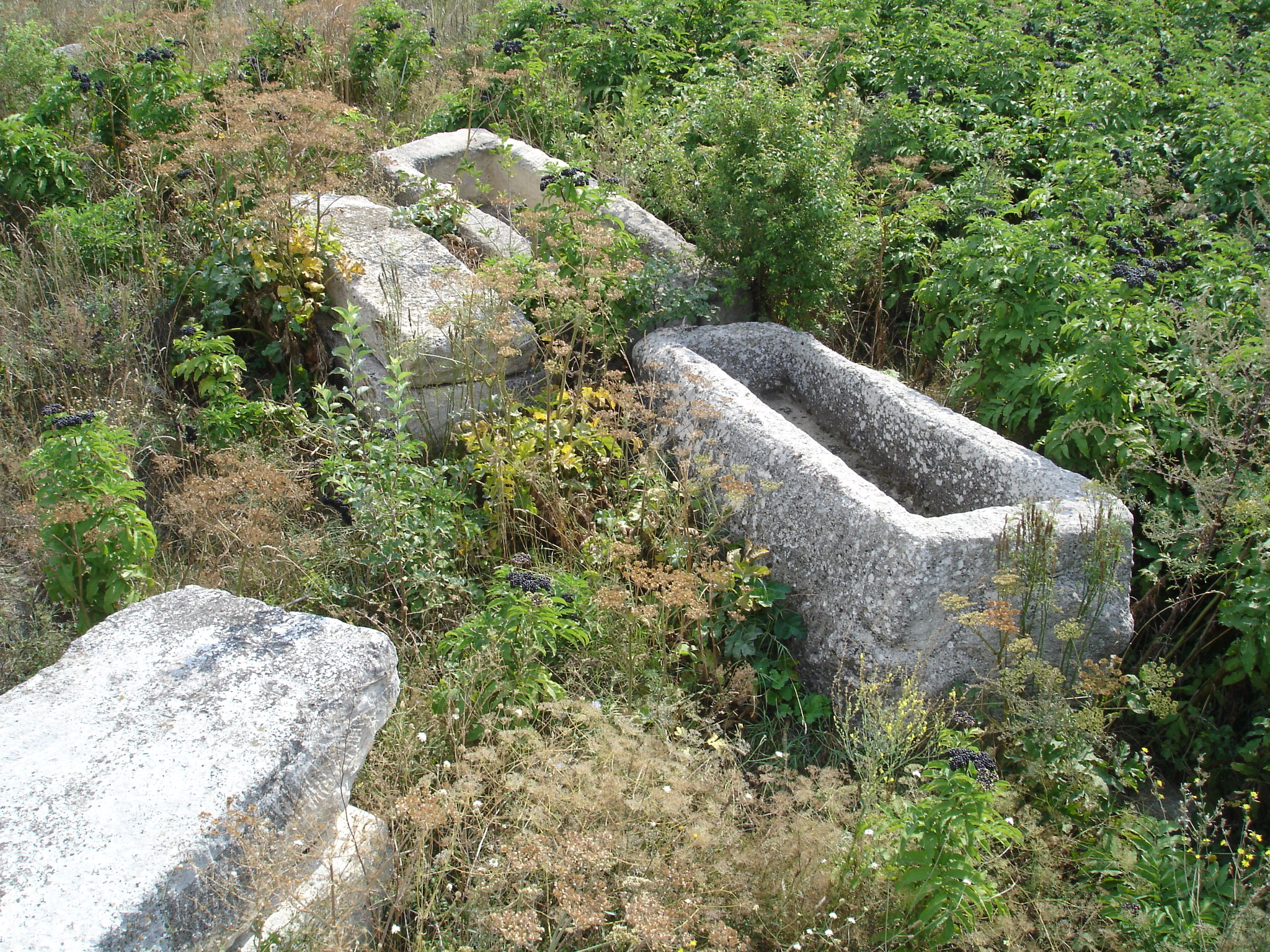
Sarcophagi near the altar

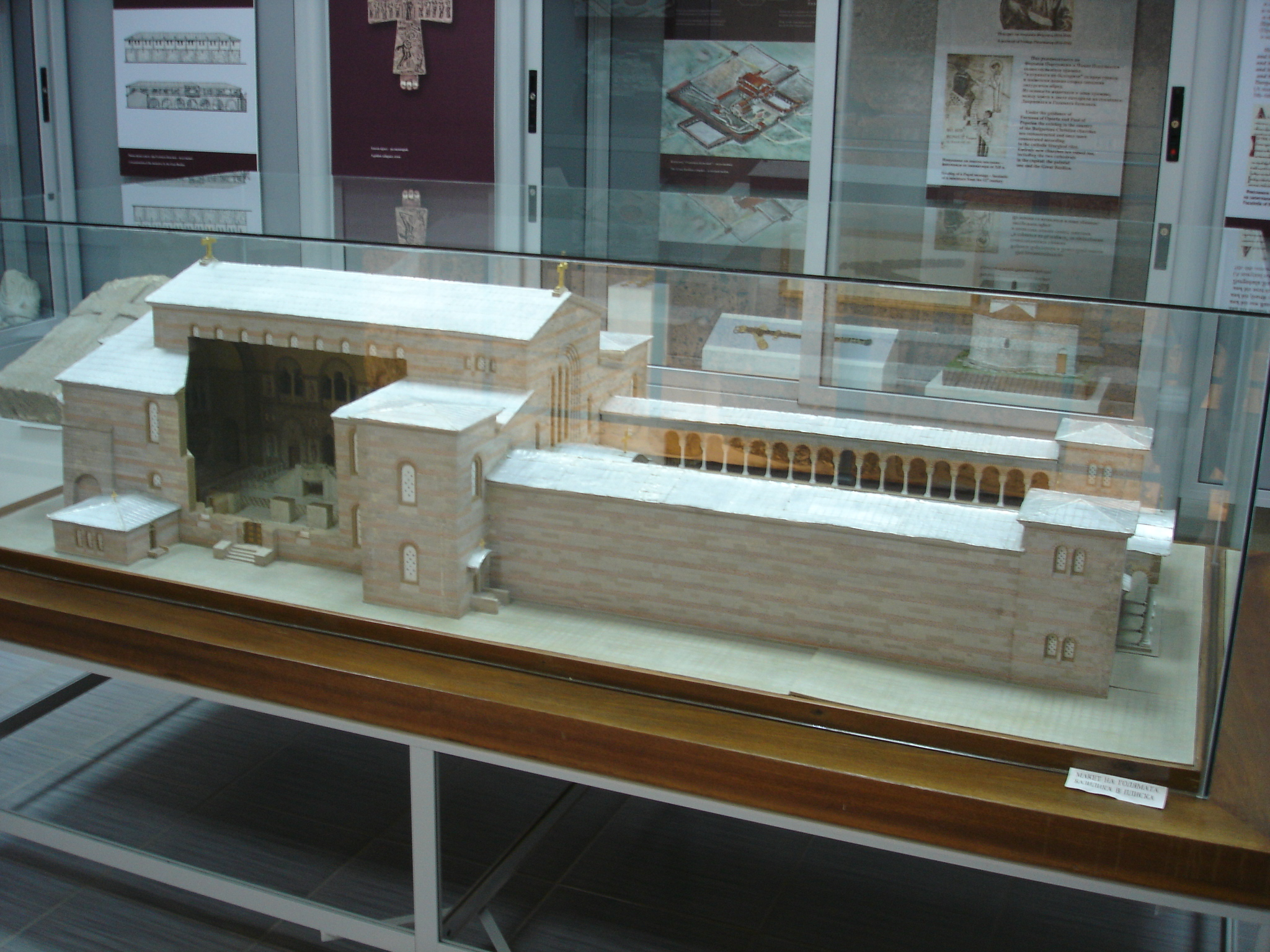
An authentic small-scale model of the basilica

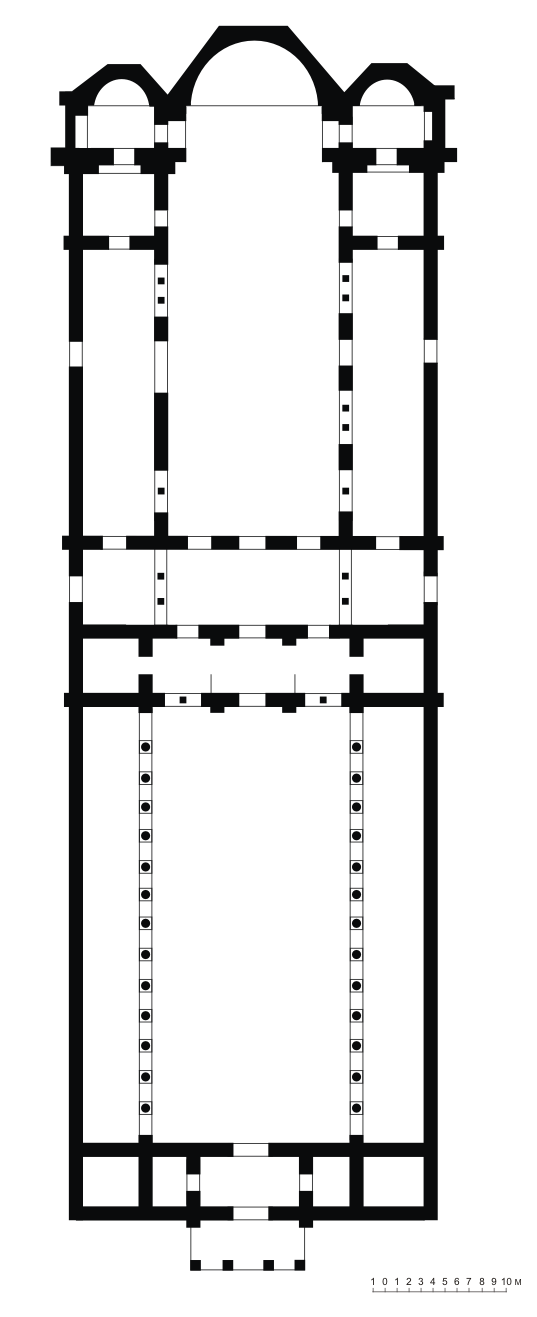
Plan
