= Pliska =

Pliska Плиска
- Town
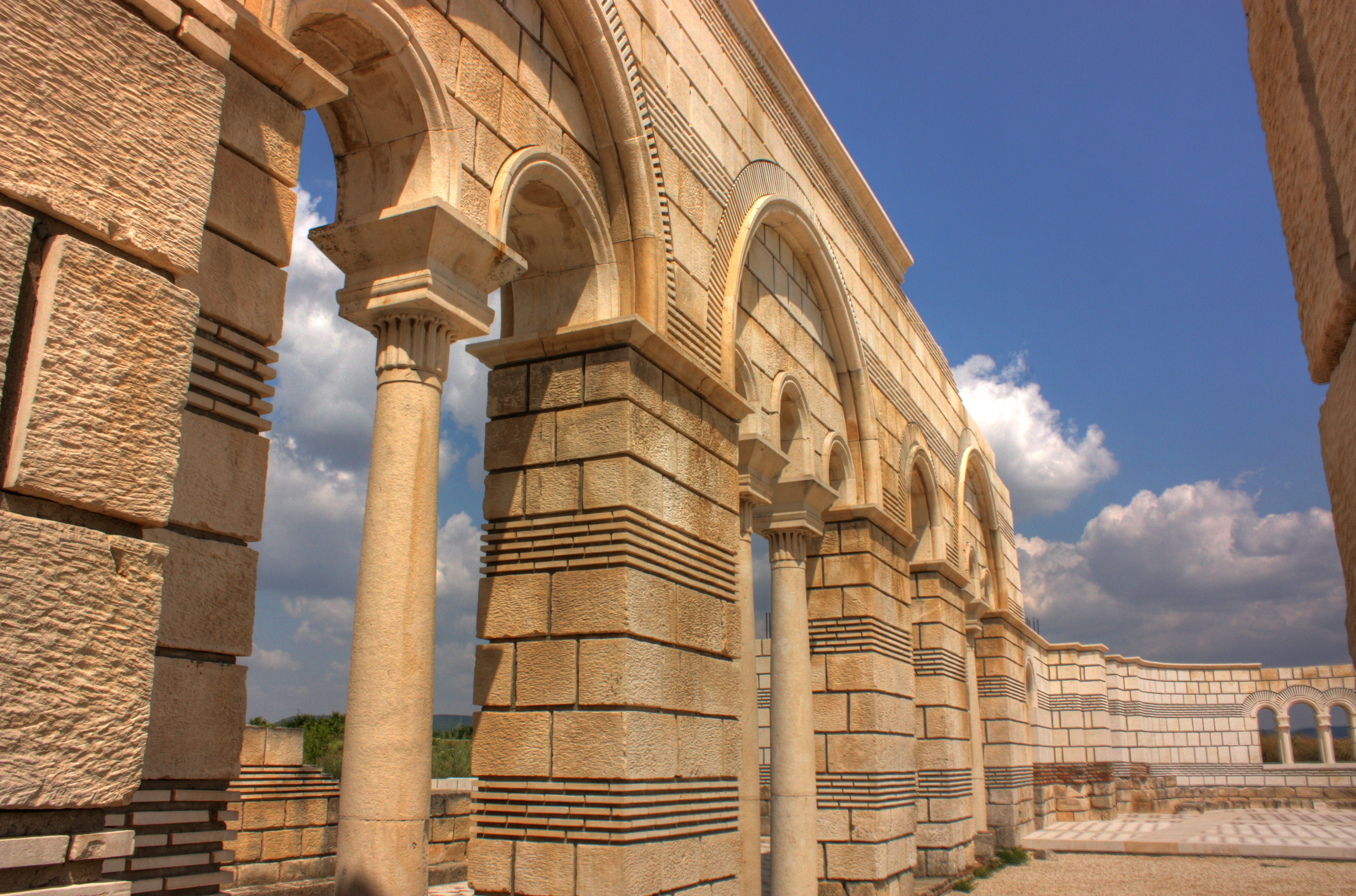
- The Great Basilica in Pliska

- Location of Pliska within Bulgaria
- Coordinates: 43.387°N 27.132°E
- Country: Bulgaria
- Province: Shumen
- Municipality: Kaspichan

Government
  - Mayor: Milena Nedeva (GERB)

Area
  - Total: 34.356 km^{2} (13.265 sq mi)
- Elevation: 145 m (476 ft)

Population (2015)
  - Total: 1,016
  - Density: 29.57/km^{2} (76.59/sq mi)
- Postal code: 9920

Pliska (Bulgarian: Плиска [ˈpliskɐ], Old Bulgarian: Пльсковъ, romanized: Plĭskovŭ) was the first capital of the First Bulgarian Empire during the Middle Ages and is now a small town in Shumen Province, on the Ludogorie plateau of the Danubian Plain, 20 km northeast of the provincial capital, Shumen.

Pliska was the first capital of Bulgaria. According to legend, it was founded by Asparuh of Bulgaria in the late 7th century; this legend is archaeologically unsubstantiated. The site was originally an encampment, with the first tent-shaped buildings at Pliska of uncertain date. No evidence exists of a settlement before the 9th century, and claims that the site dates from Late Antiquity have been contested.

By the early 9th century, Pliska was surrounded by a defensive wall and 2,300 hectares (5,700 acres) of land was further enclosed by an outer earthwork with stone revetment 21 kilometres (13 miles) long. The Byzantine army, led by the emperor Nikephoros I (r. 802–811), sacked and burned Pliska in 811. Omurtag (r. 814–831) rebuilt the city, using spolia from nearby Roman buildings and employing late Roman-inspired rectilinear and basilica plans in the architecture of his new ashlar palace, which descended from Late Antique prototypes like Diocletian's Palace at Split, Croatia. When Boris I (r. 852–889) converted to Christianity in 864, the religious buildings of Pliska were adapted for Christian use and it was after this point that the Great Basilica was constructed, together with a monastery which was attached to it. The monastery was home to the disciples of Saints Cyril and Methodius.

After the tsar Simeon I founded his new capital at Preslav, Pliska was slowly abandoned. Pliska (Medieval Greek: Πλίσκοβα, romanized: Plískova) was captured at the turn of the 2nd millennium by Theodorokanos and Nikephoros Xiphias, during the campaigns of the emperor Basil II (r. 960–1025), which ended the First Bulgarian Empire.

== History ==
=== Prior to 681 ===
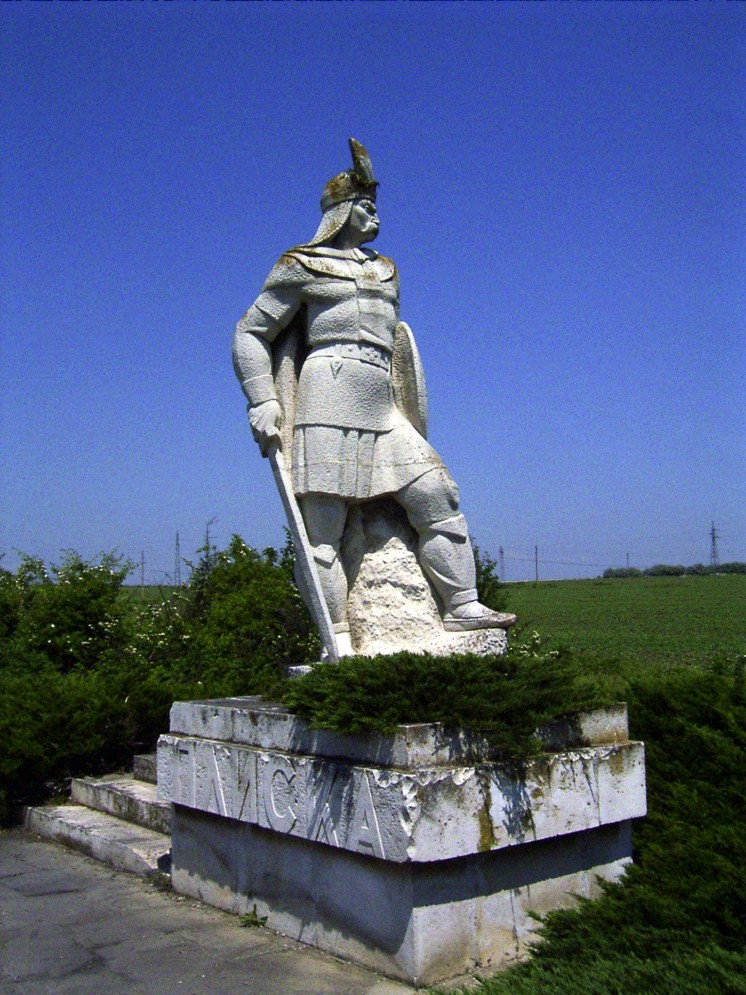
Monument of Khan Asparuh

In 680, Bulgars crossed the Danube and invaded lands now part of modern-day Bulgaria, which was at that time largely inhabited by Slavic farmers. The Bulgar army was led by Asparuh, who according to Byzantine chroniclers was one of the five sons of Kubrat, the Onogur chief who revolted against his Avar rulers and succeeded in uniting the various Bulgar groups living north of the Black Sea. When Asparukh and his warriors entered the region south of the Danube, the Byzantine Emperor Constantine IV was upset and led an army to prevent the Bulgars from remaining there. The Byzantine expedition against the Bulgars ended disastrously and after defeating the imperial forces, Asparukh forced the nearby Slavic tribes to pay tribute to him, while leaving their tribal organization intact. As a result of this defeat, the empire was forced to sign a treaty recognizing the Bulgar state in 681. Despite the area having been for some time under the de facto control of various Slavic tribes, the emperors of Byzantium had kept up the fiction that the area was still imperial, as up to 681 no true state had replaced imperial rule. This was the first time that the Byzantine empire officially acknowledged another state in the Balkans.

=== 681-893 ===
Pliska was the capital of the First Bulgarian Empire between 681 and 893. According to a Bulgarian chronicle, it was founded by Khan Asparuh. At its greatest extent, it had an area of 21.8 km^{2} (8.4 sq mi) and was surrounded by earthen ramparts. A smaller stone fortification was built inside these ramparts and this contained a palace and buildings belonging to the aristocracy.

While Pliska experienced nearly a century of growth following its selection as the capital of the new Bulgarian state, this was not a peaceful era. The Bulgars and Byzantine Empire were in an almost constant state of war during the eighth century and into the early ninth. Emperor Constantine V oversaw nine campaigns against the Bulgars between 741 and 775, and Emperor Nikephoros I's campaign in 811 resulted in the burning of the royal residence in Pliska. In this last instance the emperor led a massive army to Pliska in retaliation for the Bulgarian capture of Sardika and massacre of its garrison that occurred in an earlier set of hostilities. The Bulgarian leader Krum was not prepared to face the emperor's army and thus abandoned Pliska and the Byzantines plundered the palace and town there and burned it to the ground as it was largely at this time made of wood. Soon after, the invaders were driven out by Khan Krum (see Battle of Pliska).

Later in the ninth century, during the reign of Boris I, the pagan temples in Pliska likely began to be converted to Christian churches. In 886, Boris founded the Pliska Literary School which was moved to Preslav when Boris later relocated the capital. When Boris fell seriously ill and retired to a monastery, his son Vladimir succeeded him and attempted to reestablish paganism. During this period (889–93) the large stone basilica at Pliska built under Boris was heavily damaged. Boris left his monastery to overthrow his son, and after succeeding, relocated the capital to the nearby town of Preslav which seems to have been a centre of Christianity in the state. Following this Pliska's relevance in Bulgar governance steadily declined until the Bulgarian state was destroyed by the Byzantine general turned emperor (when he murdered the previous emperor Nikephoros Phokas) John Tzimiskes. He defeated the Kyivan Rus' forces that had occupied Bulgaria and annexed the Bulgarian lands all the way to the Danube, ending the rule of the first Bulgarian state in these territories. During this Rus' and Byzantine war over Bulgaria, Pliska was destroyed between 969 and 972 and was not rebuilt.

== Archaeology of Pliska ==
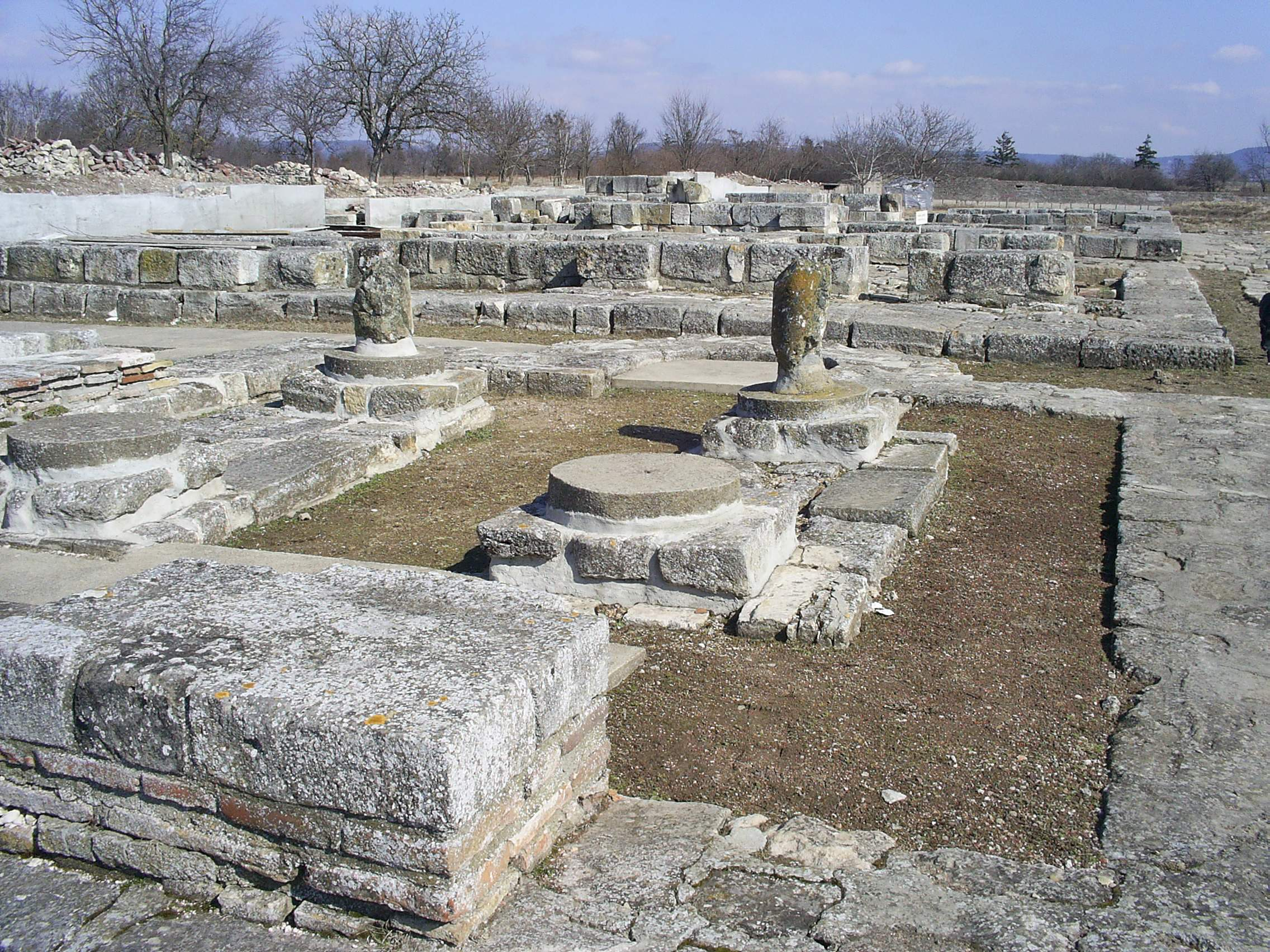
Ruins of the early medieval city of Pliska, the first Bulgarian capital

The construction of an earthen rampart was started shortly after the Bulgars settled in the Pliska plain (it has been suggested that these embankments may not have been built all at once), and the territory inside of this is known as the Outer Town, which consisted of multiple groupings of modest cottages with space in between for flocks of livestock and horses. This seemingly unusual layout may have been chosen as the Bulgars had been nomadic prior to building their capital at Pliska, and when they began to cooperate with the local Slavs (which formed a strong majority of the new state's population) a mixed pastoral and agricultural economy developed. The Inner Town, which was likely built later in the settlement's existence, consisted of a palace, basilica and aristocratic buildings inside a stone fortification. The Inner Town was surrounded by the Outer Town which was in turn surrounded by the earthen rampart.

Overall, far less is known about the layout and contents of Pliska prior to the conversion to Christianity than afterwards. No stone buildings have been dated with certainty from before the Bulgars converted to Christianity in 864/5, and many wooden buildings (which were initially presumed to have come from the pagan era) also appear to have been built later on. It's not clear which buildings were built in the decades immediately after 681. When the earthen rampart was built, Pliska had a very low population. Dimitrov's map based on the 1989 to 1991 dredging works in the Outer Town suggests that there were no more than six to twelve hamlet sized settlements there, while there might have been thirty or so by the tenth century.

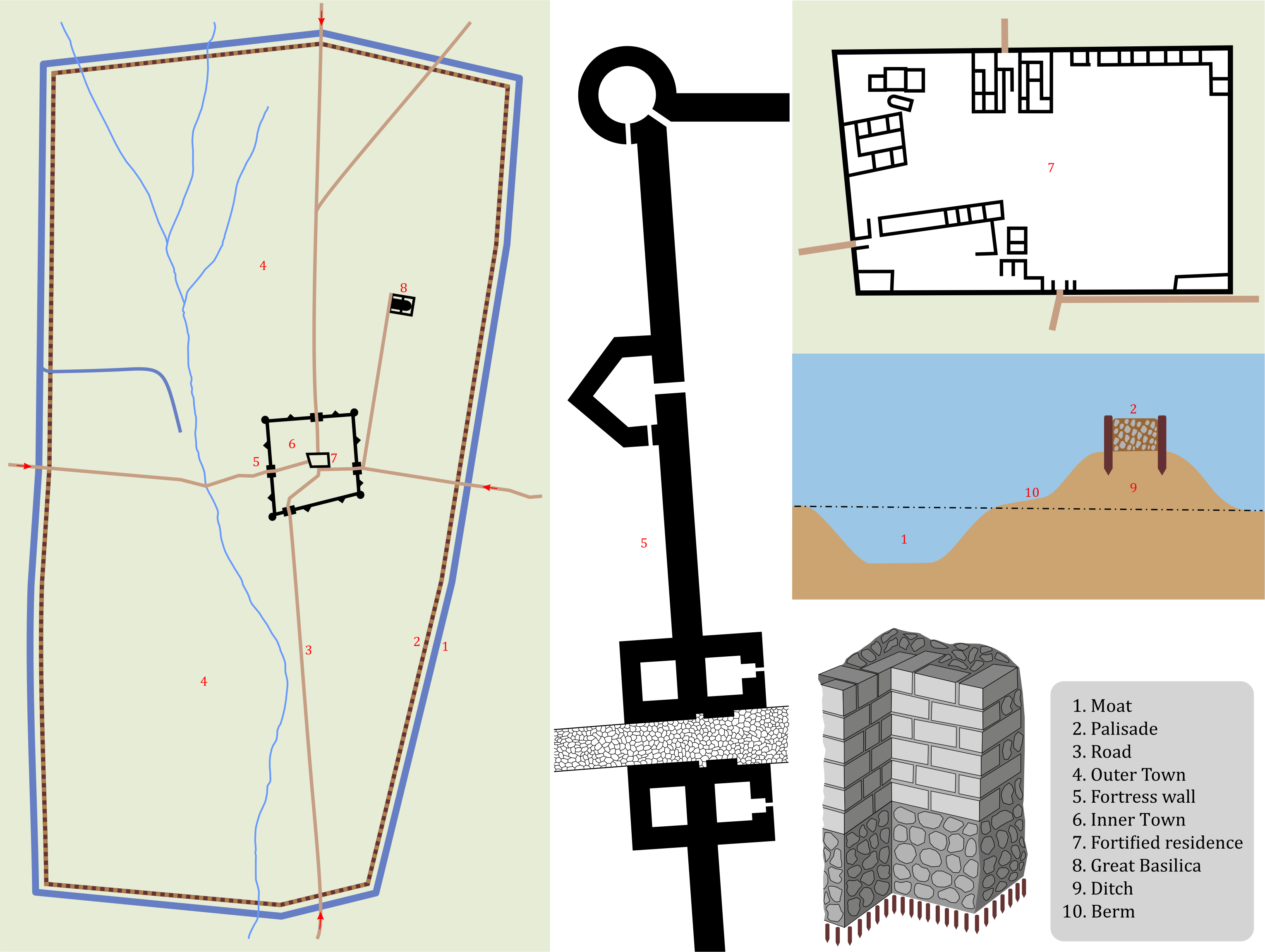
Pliska fortress plan

There is however still no plausible explanation for why the earthen rampart and ditch built around Pliska encircled such a large area. A few areas appear to have been inhabited by people who provided services or took part in craft production for the palace centre, and agriculture clearly took place within the earthen rampart around the Outer Town. There was clearly a fair amount of open ground inside the earthen rampart. Henning concludes that the settlement was initially built for military and strategic reasons, and could not really be considered a typical city (with all of the associated trade, production, and population) until the period after Bulgaria converted to Christianity in 864/5. Most of the stone architecture in Pliska was built between this conversion and eventual Byzantine conquest of the city in 971. The buildings from this era show a clear Byzantine influence in their design and function. For example, a 4 kilometre-long canal fed a large brick cistern that moved water from the Kriva river to the Inner Town via ceramic pipes. This cistern had attached rooms containing private baths.

Only certain parts of the archaeological site of the city have been properly investigated. One of the most thoroughly researched is the Asar-dere area just to the west of the stone fortification surrounding the Inner Town. Four clay-made furnaces have been discovered in this area, suggesting that Pliska possessed a specialized pottery making capabilities and an urban economy at some point during its development.

Initially, such finds were interpreted to show that early on the settlement relied upon pastoral and agricultural activities, and later developed sophisticated craft techniques. This interpretation was further supported by the relatively late dating of the first occurrences of glazed ceramic ware found in Pliska. At the very earliest these came from the late ninth century, though some certainly dated from the tenth and eleventh centuries as well.

However, more recent investigation of the Asar-dere area has shown that the area contained a large waste disposal site alongside multiple hearths and kilns all dating from the earliest occupation phase. The content of the waste shows that ceramics were produced early in the settlement's history. Other finds from this first phase of occupation (from the eighth until the beginning of the ninth century) include those connected with iron processing, such as slag, charcoal, ash, and pig iron. Fragments and solid droplets of glass suggest glassmaking are also found from this same period. These types of finds are not extant in this area in the tenth and eleventh centuries, when it was instead occupied by numerous small and primitive grubenhaus dwellings. According to Henning;

“It was not the case that a predominantly agricultural style of living opened the way to a stepwise growth in craft activities, but rather a situation of fully developed and highly specialized artisan production was followed later by a process of broad ruralization”.

== Scholarly disputes ==
Some scholars, such as Georgiev and Kirilov, have proposed that Pliska was not in fact the capital of Bulgaria during this period at all. Georgiev suggests that Pliska was only a seasonal residence with small timber buildings at least until the middle of the eighth century. Kirilov offers the explanation that like the Ottonian kings, the Bulgar rulers were itinerant, and travelled between multiple different residences. Additionally, prior to some more recent finds in the Asar-dere area of the archaeological site, it was believed that the craft activities attested by Milčev showed that site did not become a true large town until the later ninth or early tenth century, however Henning shows that this may have occurred in reverse order. Ceramic fragments on the floors of many of the pit-houses suggested (based on their depth in the soil) at first that the pottery was made and those houses were occupied in the later occupation period of the settlement. Excavation of the pit-house designated "grubenhaus No. 8" however precipitated a sharp conceptual turn amongst many researchers towards the belief that the pit-houses may largely have been built much earlier, and this suggests that the famous Great Basilica may have been built after rather than before the majority of the pit-houses, meaning it may not have been built in 864 as long supposed, but instead as late as the later tenth century.

== Modern Pliska ==
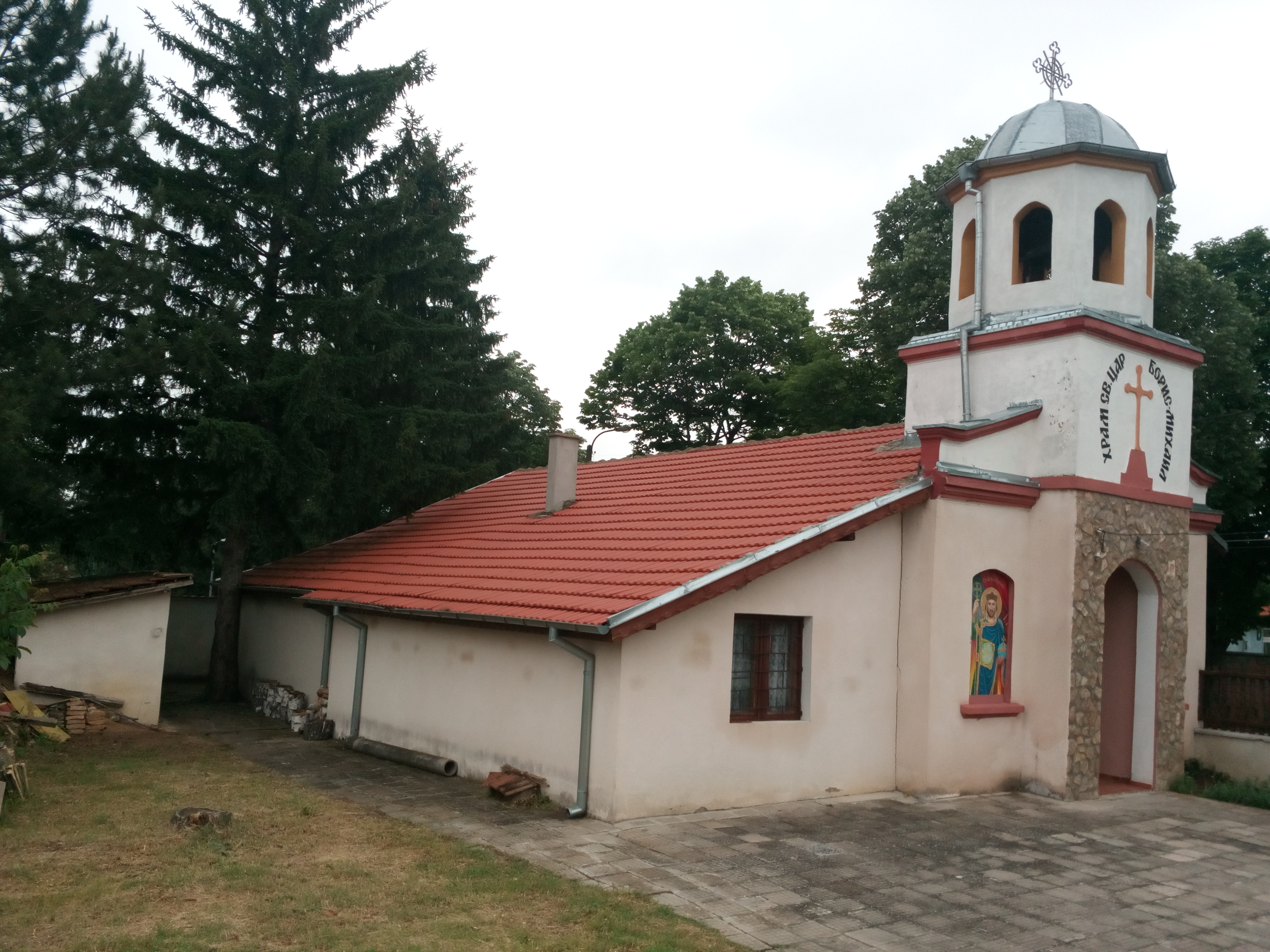
Orthodox Church in Pliska

The ruins of the city of Pliska lie 3 km north of the modern village of Pliska. The site of the city is currently a National Archaeological Reserve. Ruins of the Great and the Small Palace, the strong stone fortifications and the Great Basilica (c. 875), used both as a royal church and as a national patriarchal cathedral, can be seen in the reserve.

Under Ottoman rule, the village known as Pliska since 1947 was instead called Aboba (Ağa Baba in Ottoman times), a name which it kept until 1925, when the name was changed to Pliskov, a variant of the current name. The settlement has a population of 1,124 and is located 146 m above sea level in Shumen Province at the south end of the Ludogorie plateau. It is approximately 400 km northeast of Sofia, at 43°22′N 27°7′E.

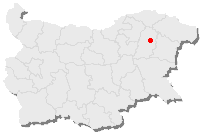

== Gallery ==
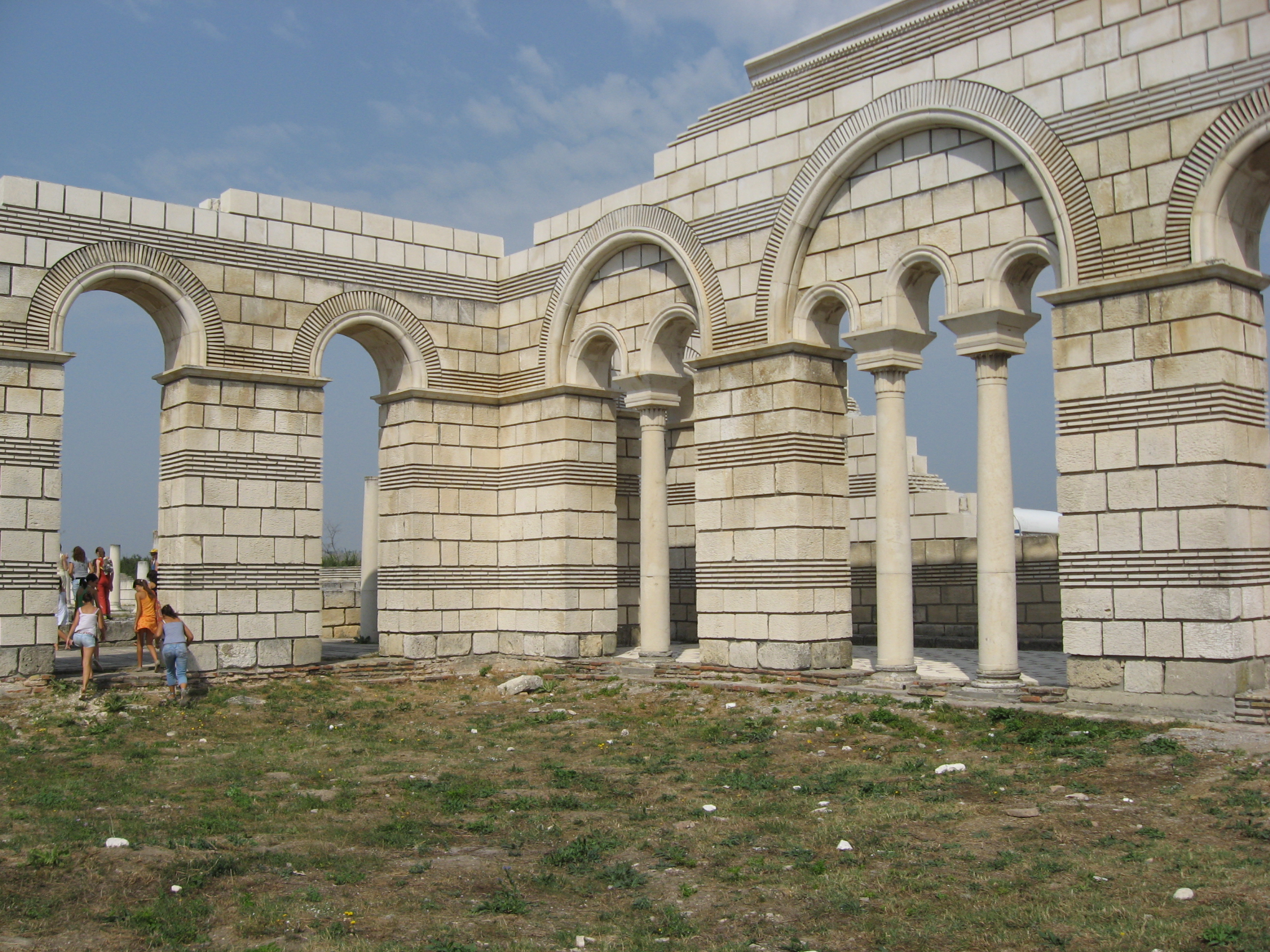
The Great Basilica

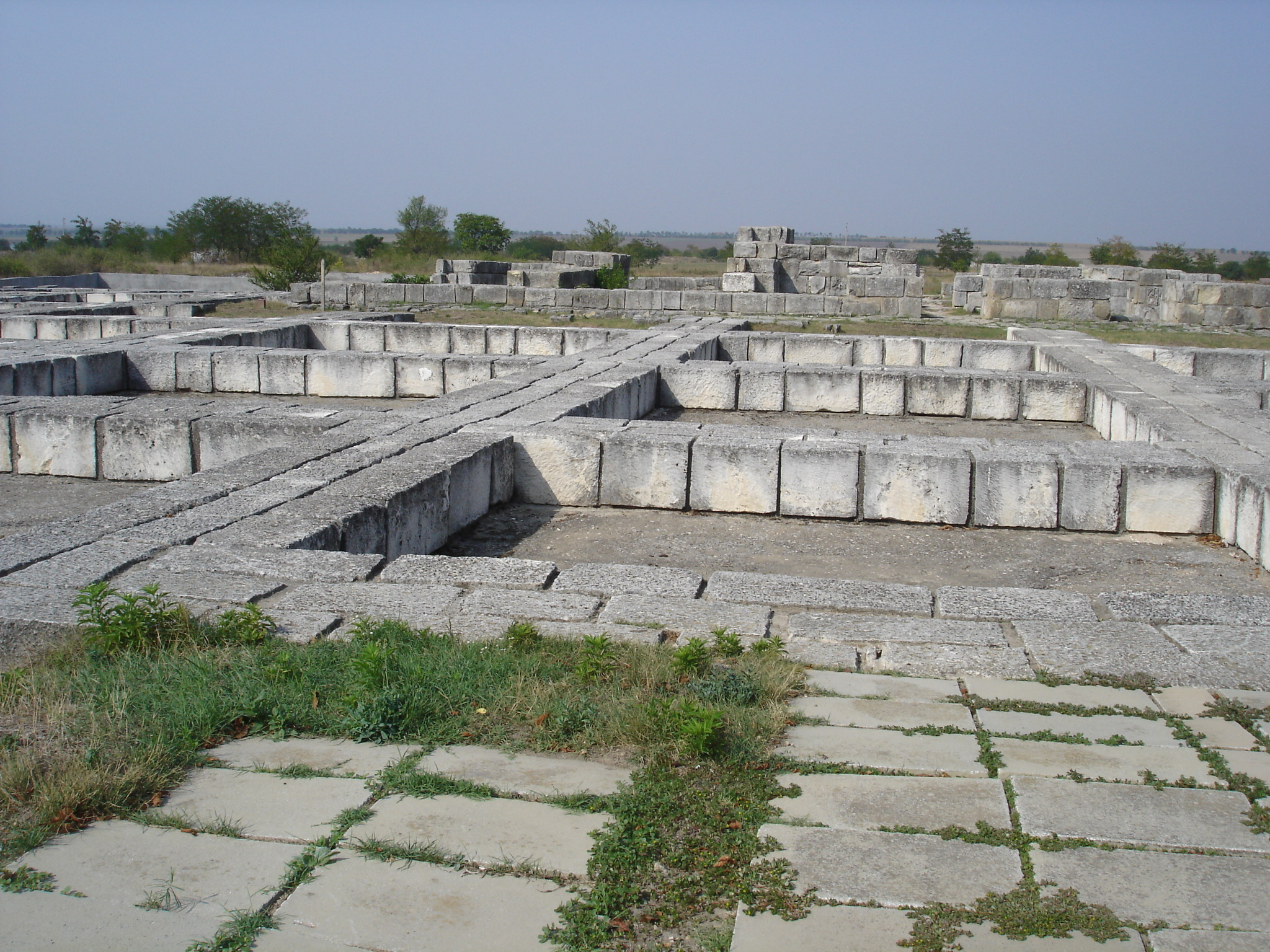
Ruins of the royal palace

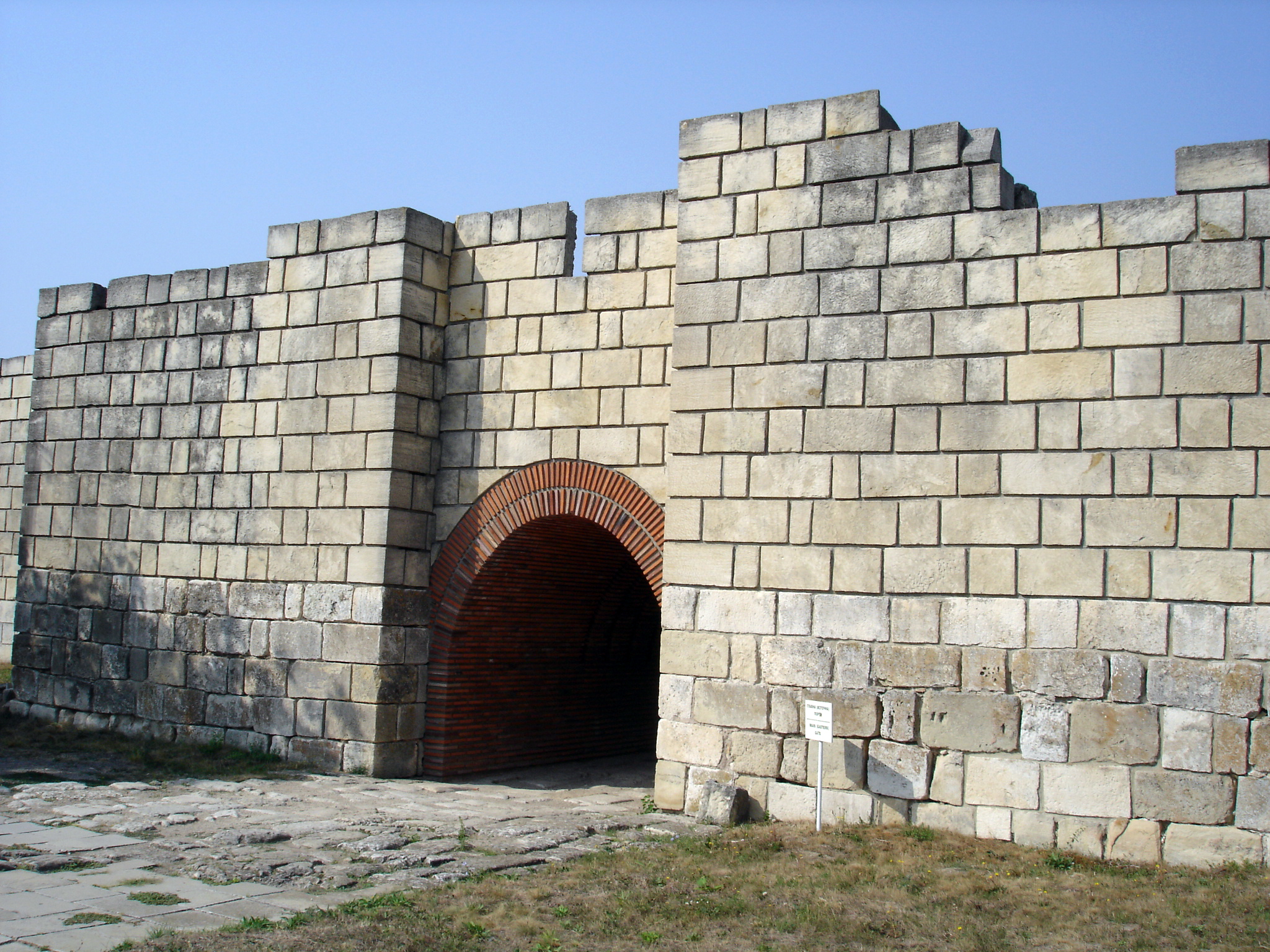
Gate to the castle

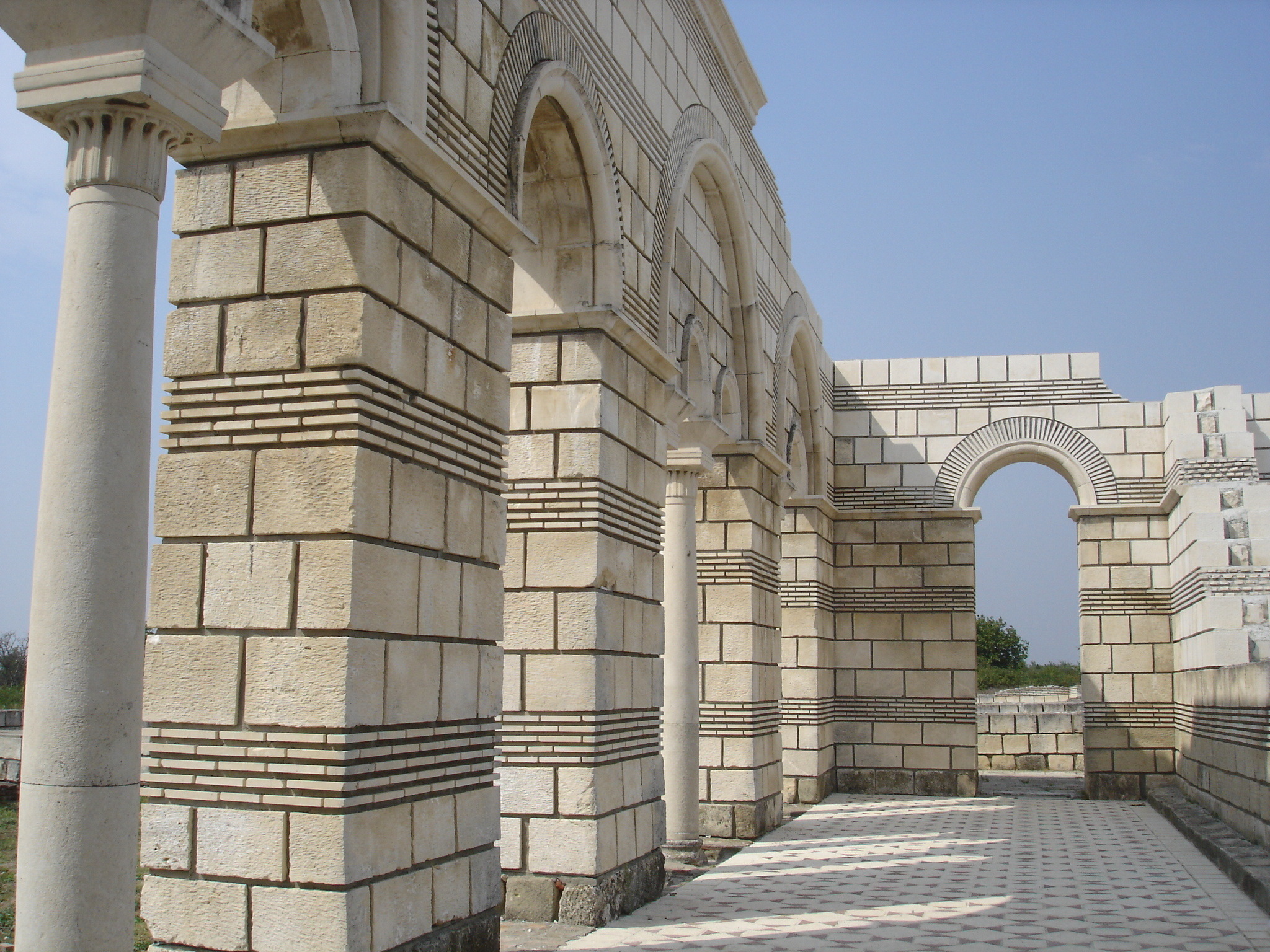
The Great Basilica

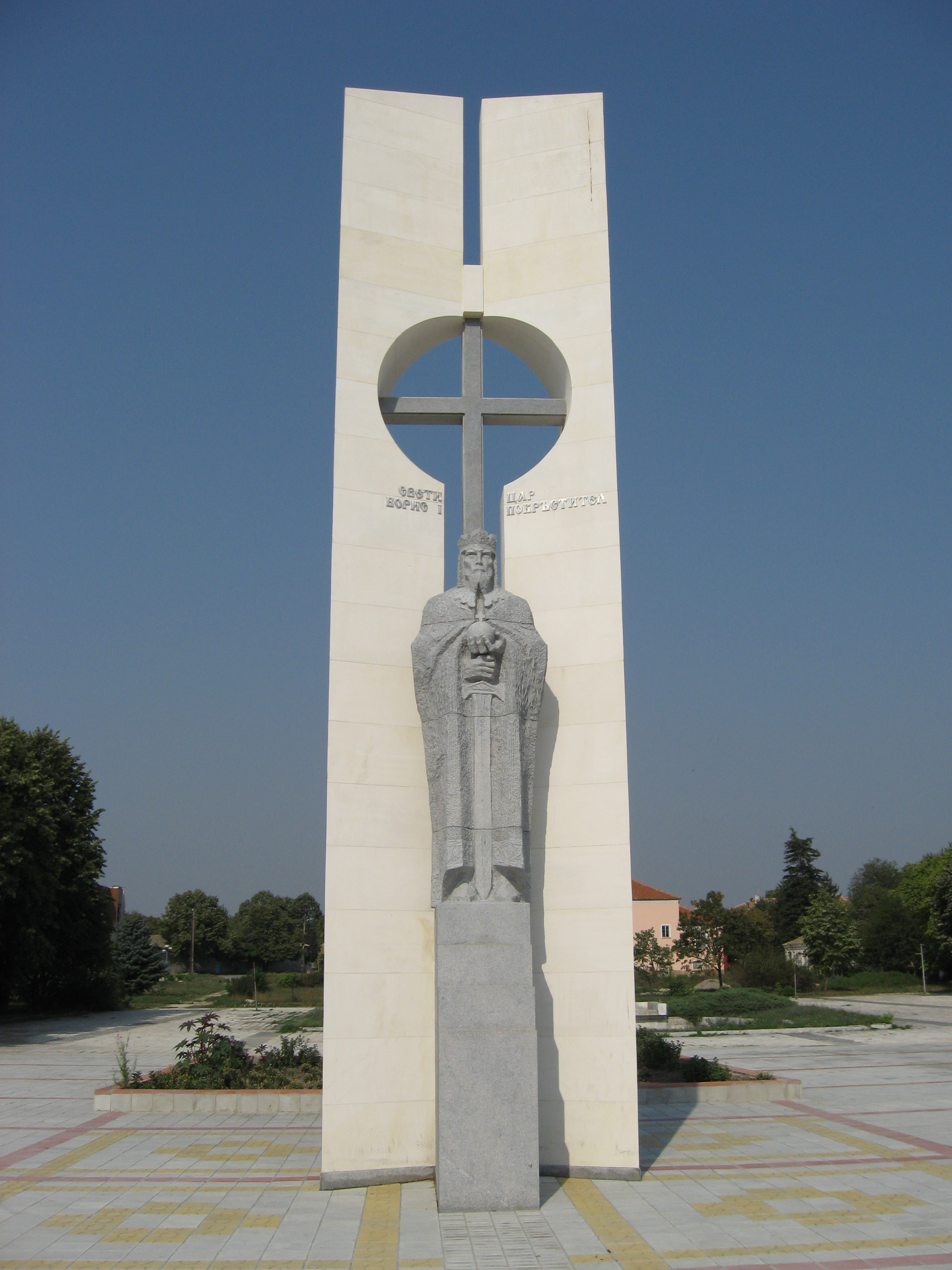
Monument to Boris I

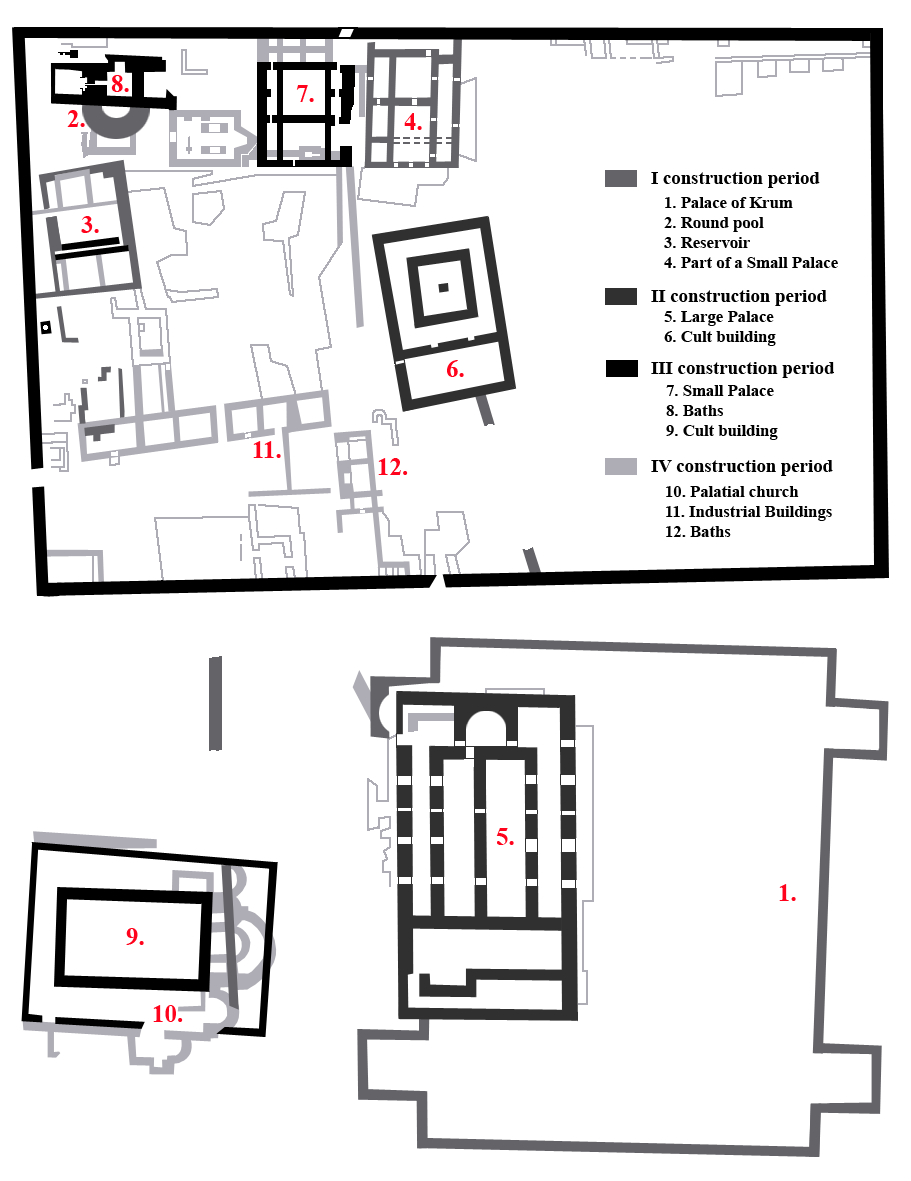
Pliska, plan of the palace complex

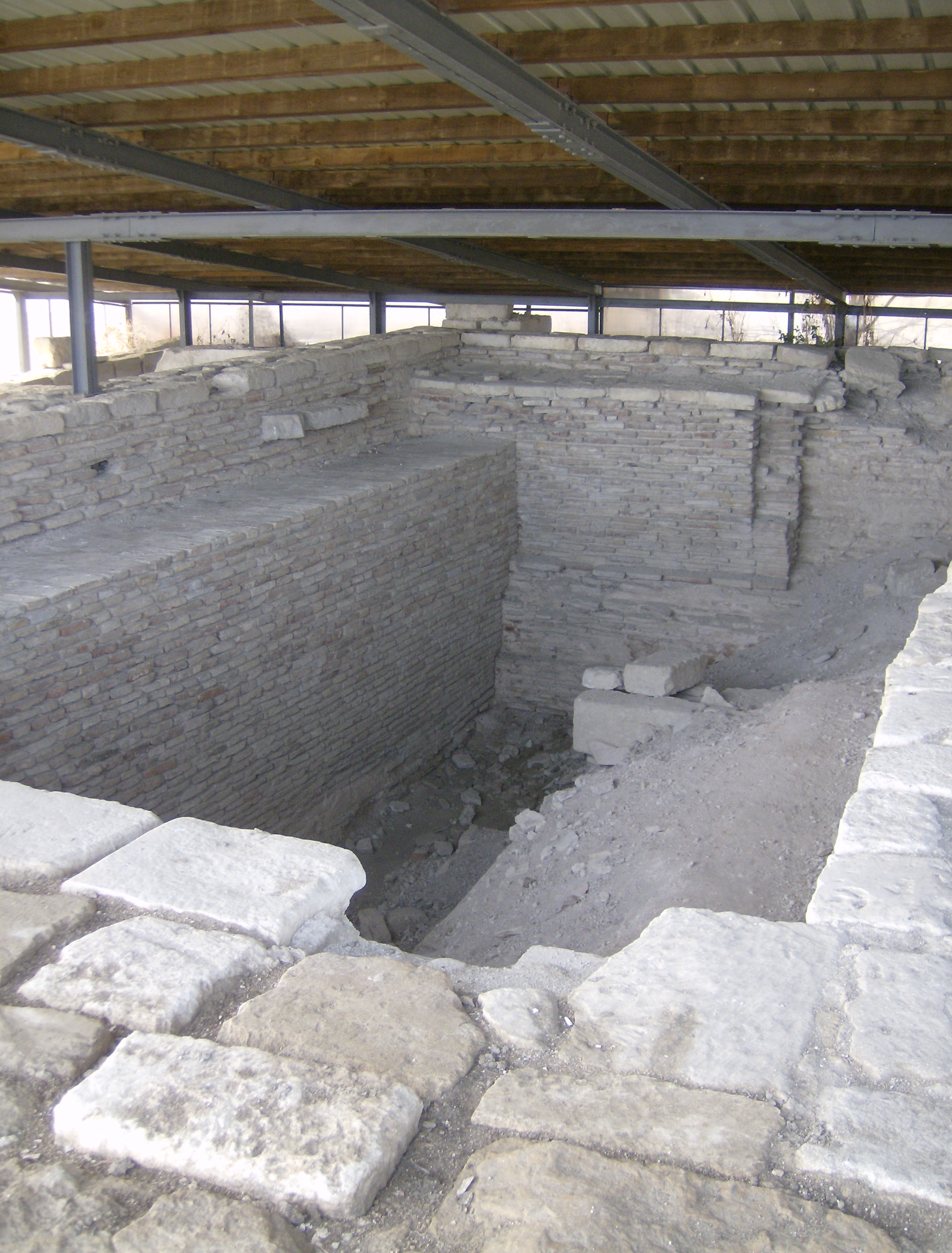

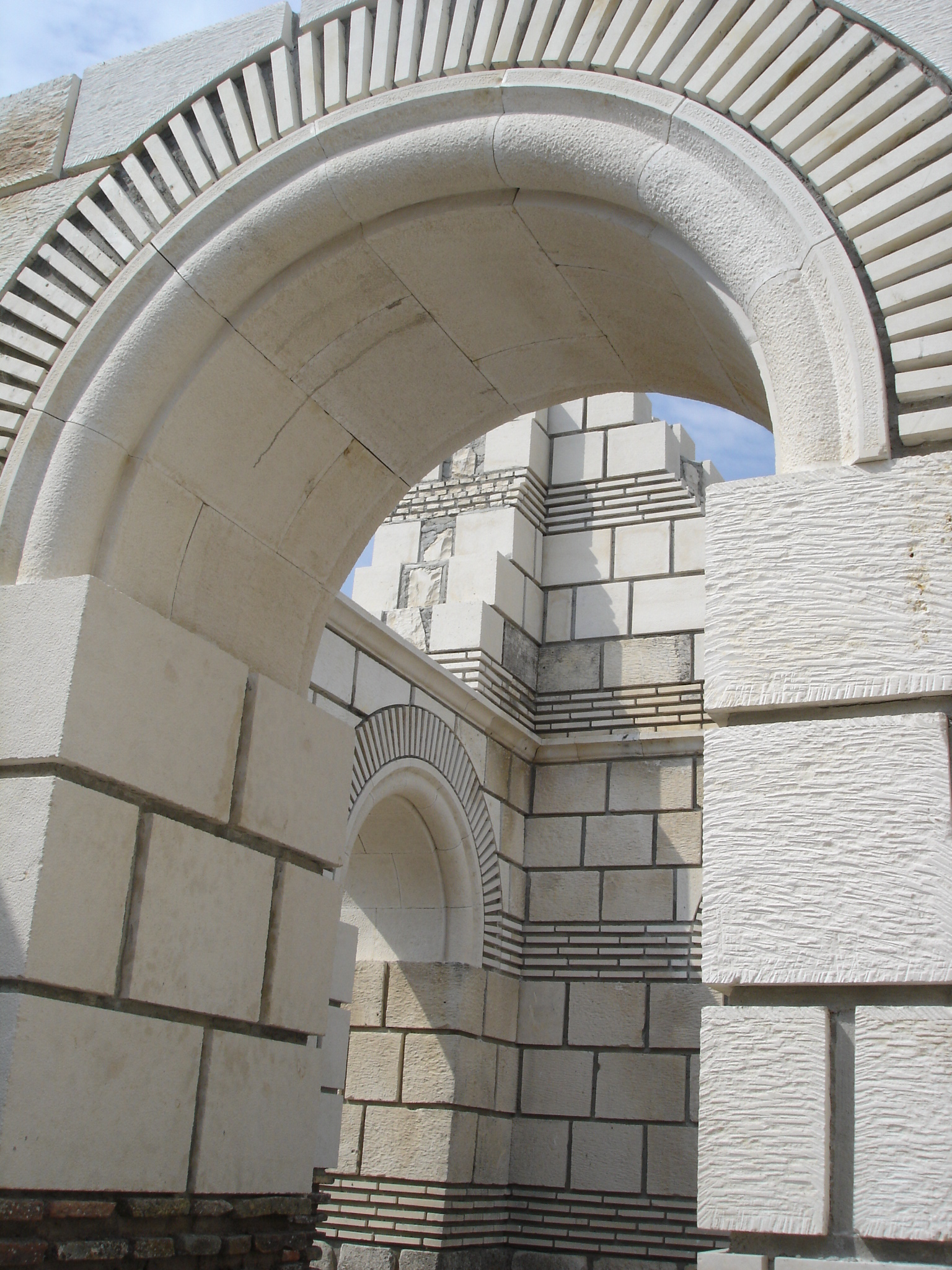

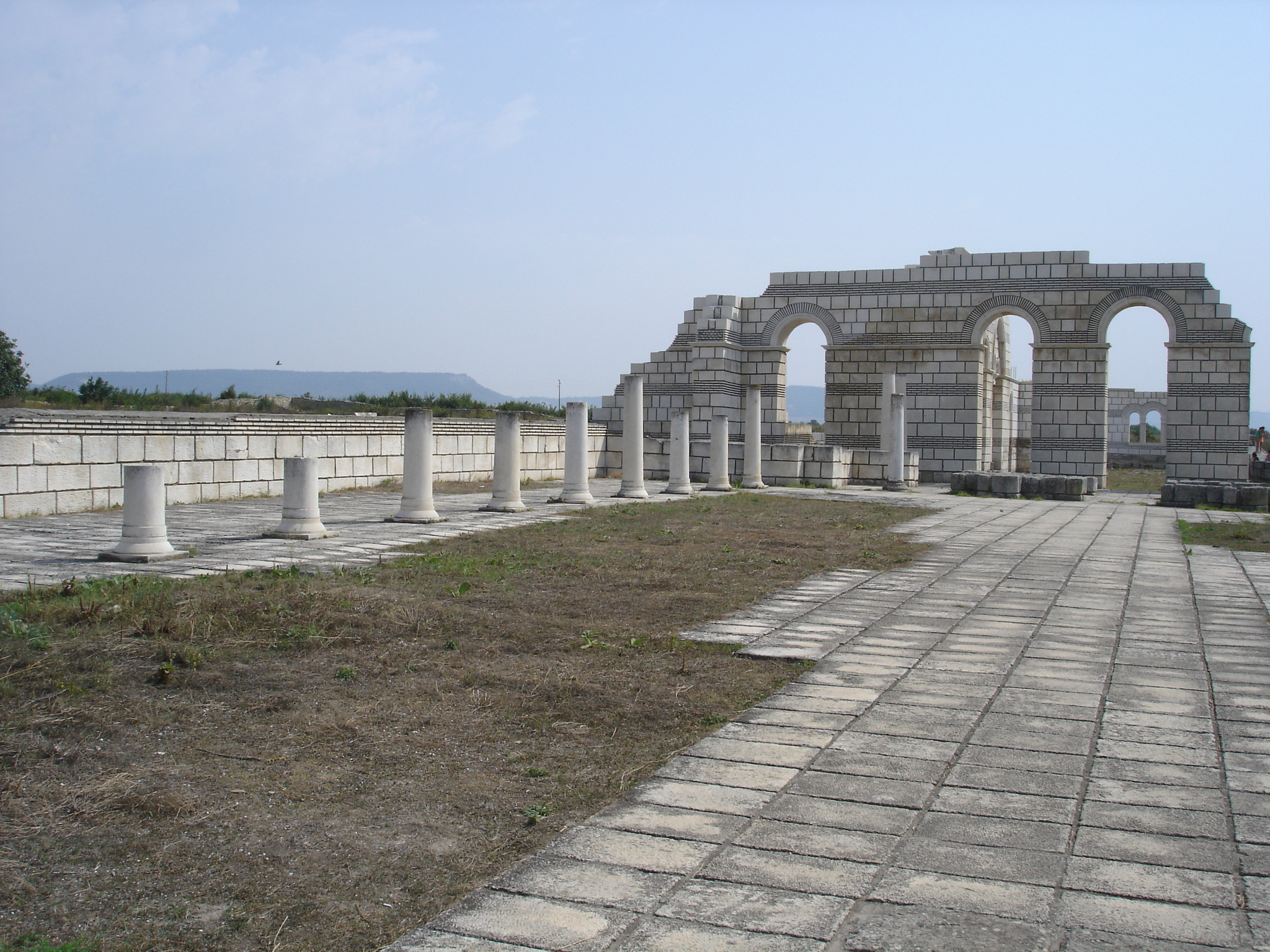

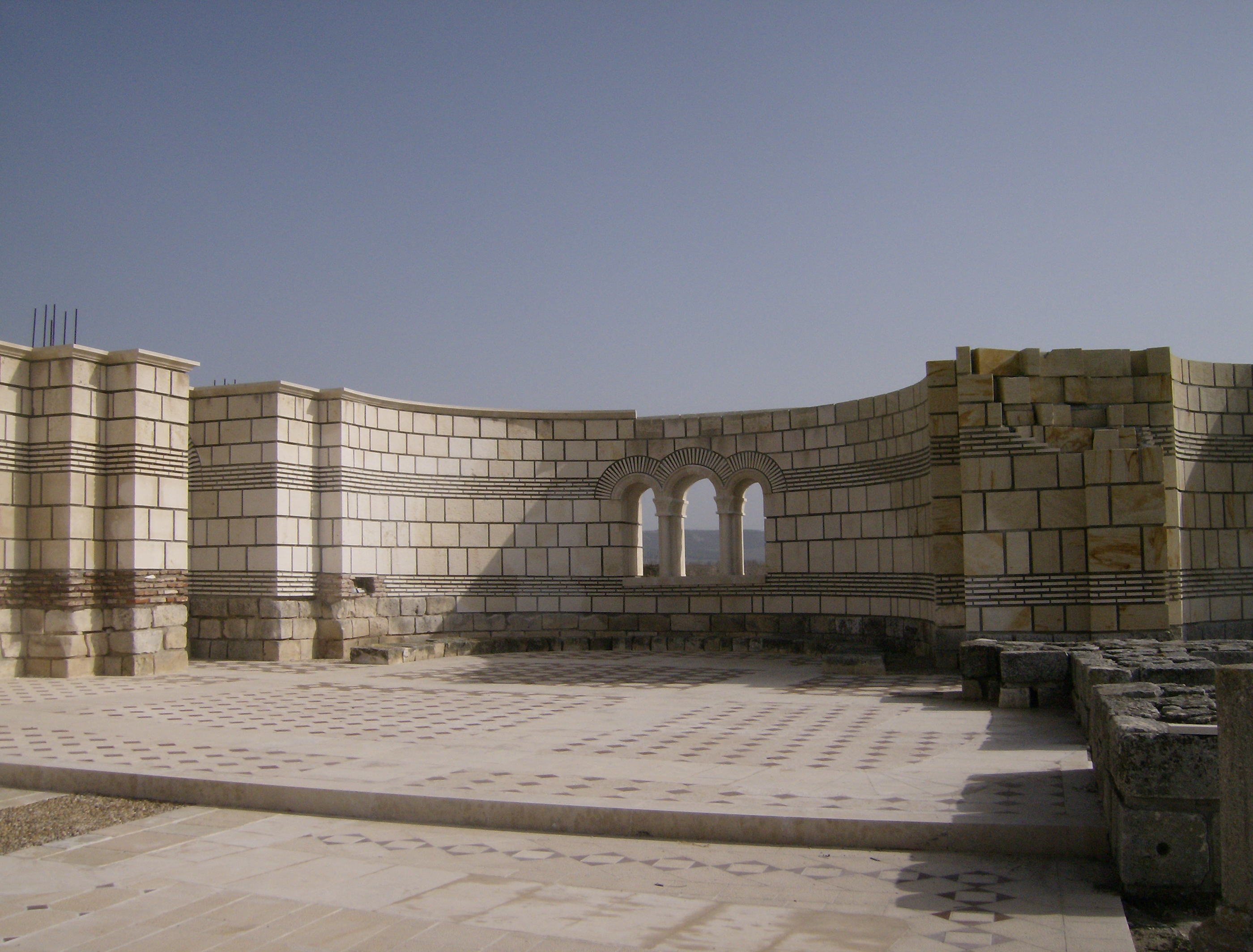

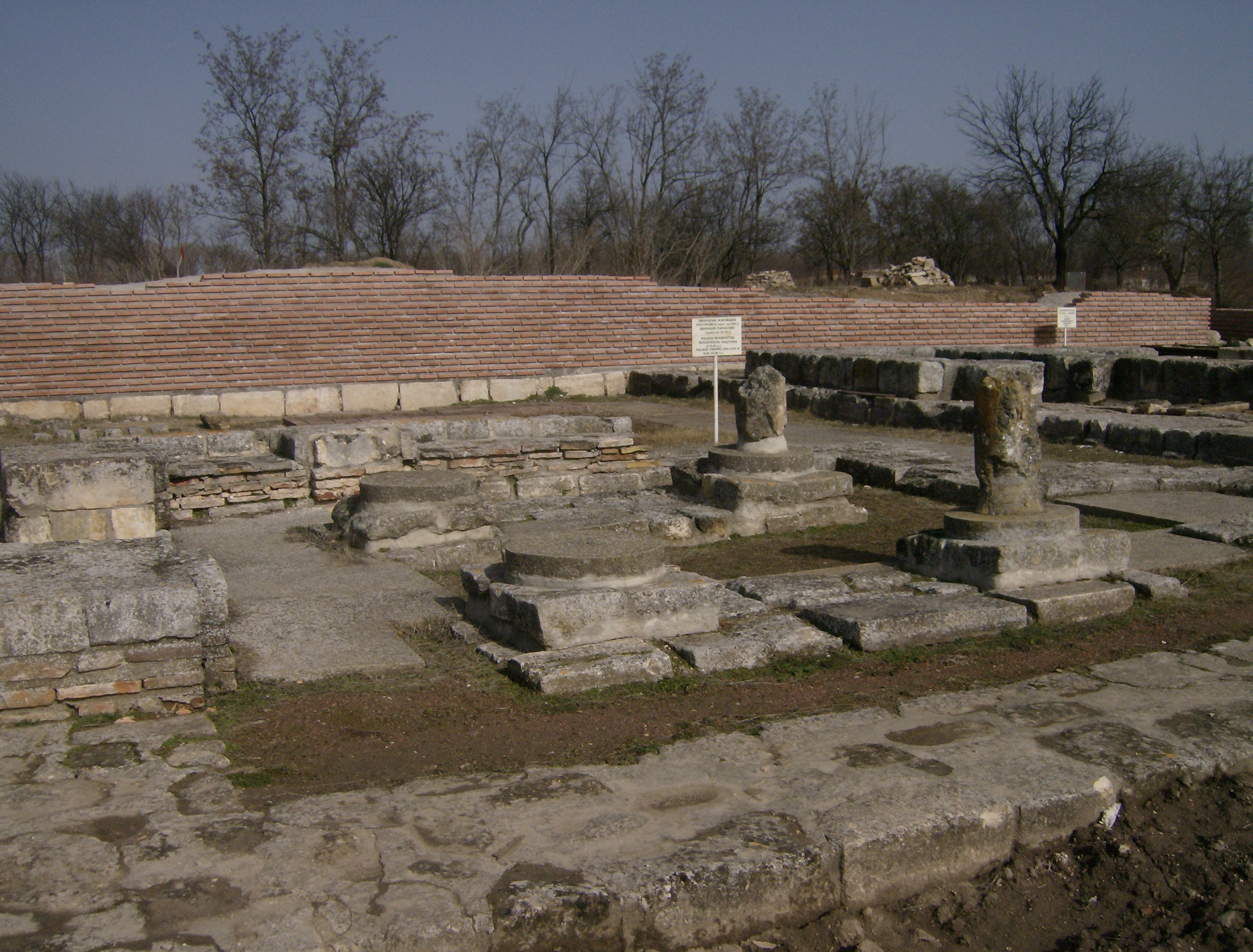

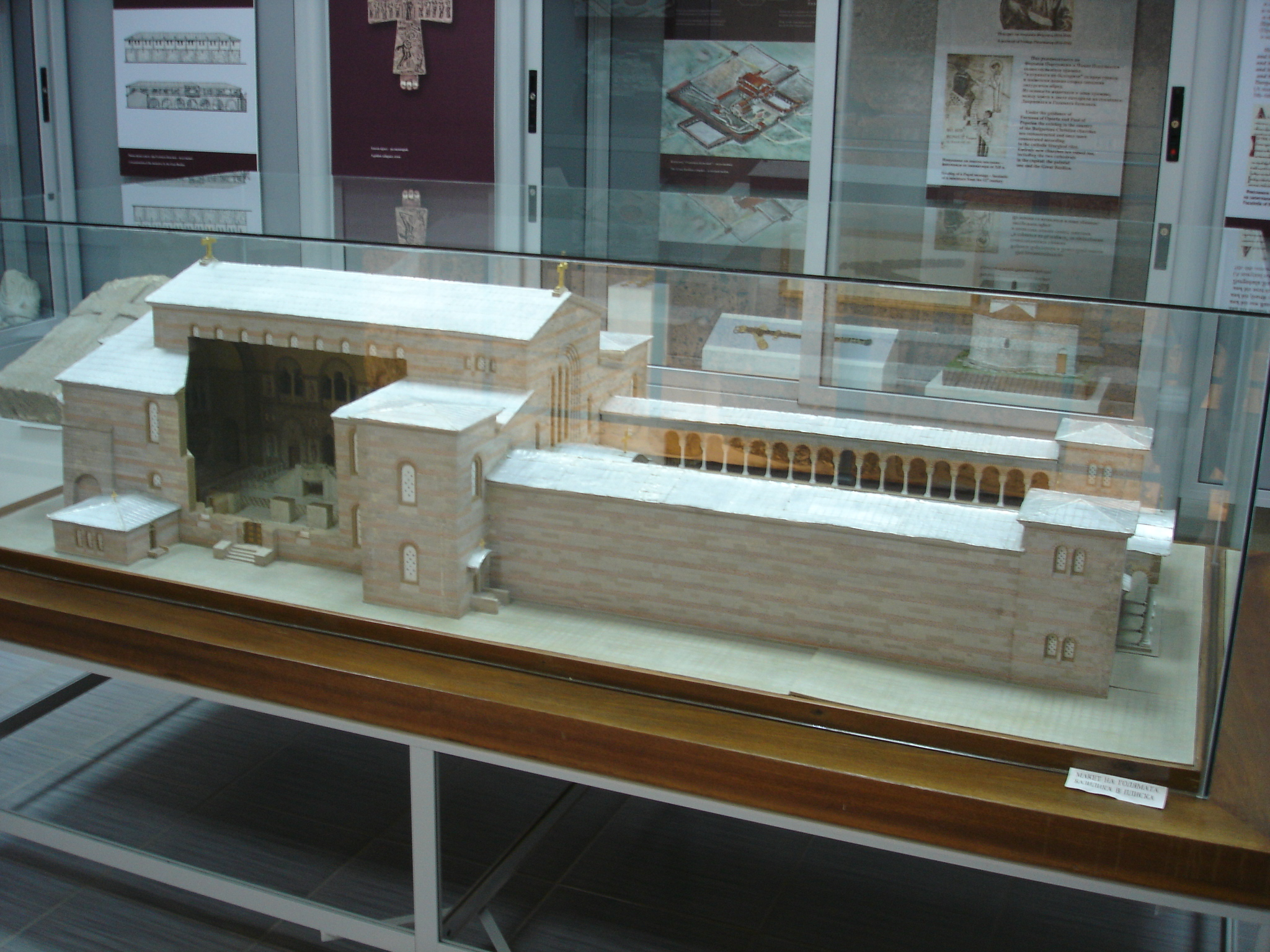
