= Theodorokanos =

Byzantine general

Theodorokanos (Greek: Θεοδωροκάνος) was a Byzantine general of Armenian origin active under Basil II both in the East and in the Balkans.

== Life ==
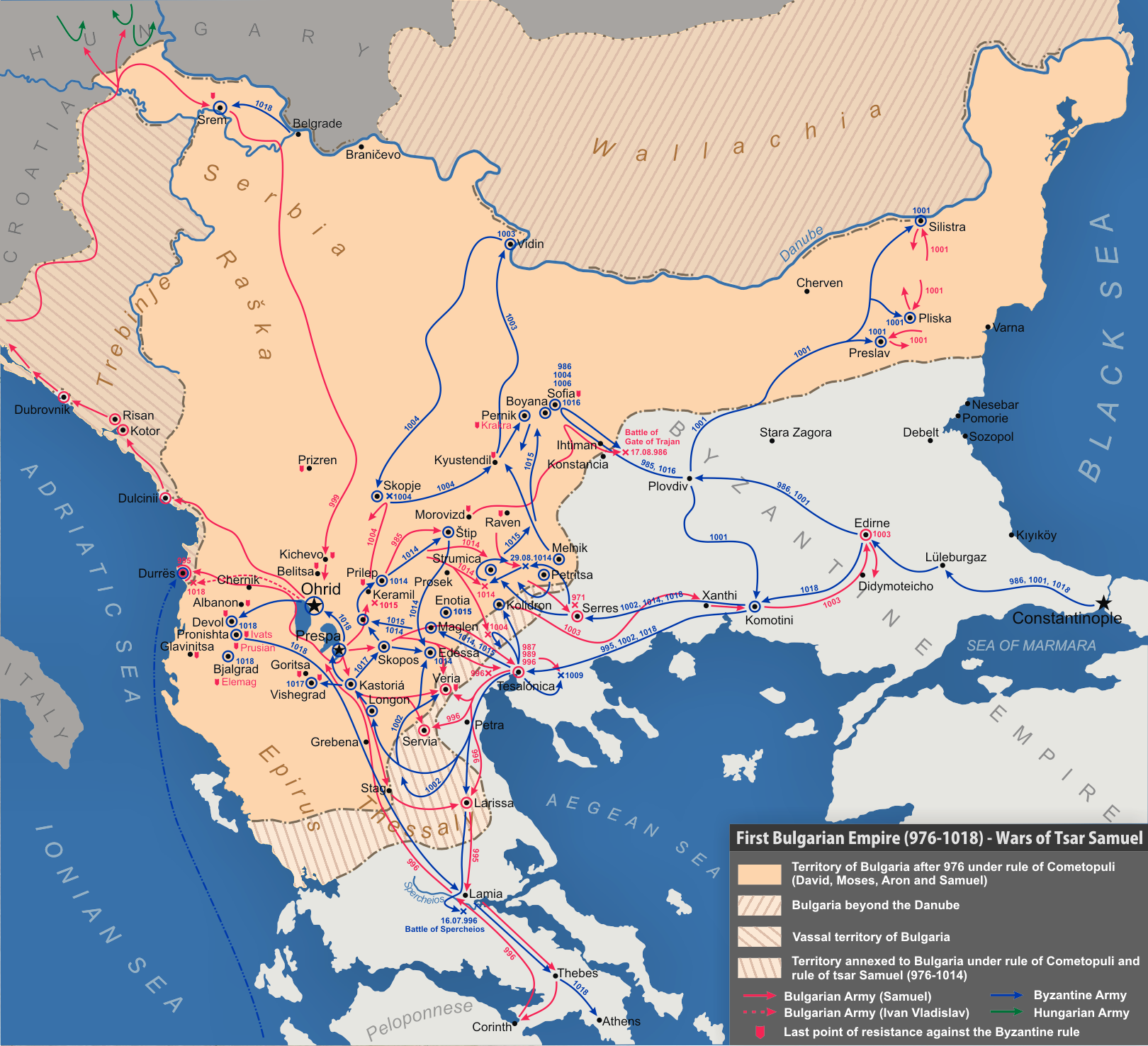
Map of the Byzantine–Bulgarian wars in the time of Emperor Basil II and Tsar Samuel of Bulgaria

His name is the hellenized form of Armenian T‘ot‘orakan ("belonging to Theodore"). A series of seals attributed to him by Ivan Jordanov allows a tentative reconstruction of his early career, holding the ranks of protospatharios and epi tou Chrysotriklinou and serving as the strategos (military governor) of Artze and as archegetes of the East. It is likely that he was strategos of Artze between 975 and 979, as the fortress was in Byzantine hands at that time, and was then promoted to archegetes, an office recently created that entailed overall command over the professional (and mostly Armenian) infantry of the eastern field armies.

He is first directly mentioned in the historical writings of John Skylitzes in the 990s (ca. 994 according to Nicholas Adontz), when he was appointed by Emperor Basil II, at the time embroiled in the long war with Bulgaria, as strategos in Philippopolis. In the year 1000, along with Nikephoros Xiphias, he led an army that rapidly captured the Bulgarian fortresses of Great Preslav, Little Preslav (Presthlavitza) and Pliska, completing the re-imposition of Byzantine control over the northeastern portions of the Bulgarian state, first conquered by Emperor John Tzimiskes in the early 970s. Shortly after, Theodorokanos retired due to his advanced age, and was replaced by Xiphias.

The generals George Theodorokanos and Basil Theodorokanos, active later in the 11th century, were considered his sons by Adontz, but, although likely, such a relationship cannot be proven.

== Sources ==
- Cheynet, Jean-Claude (2003). "Basil II and Asia Minor". In Magdalino, Paul (ed.). Byzantium in the Year 1000. Leiden: Brill. pp. 71–108. ISBN 90-04-12097-1.
- Kazhdan, Alexander, ed. (1991). The Oxford Dictionary of Byzantium. Oxford and New York: Oxford University Press. ISBN 0-19-504652-8.
- Lilie, Ralph-Johannes; Ludwig, Claudia; Pratsch, Thomas; Zielke, Beate (2013). Prosopographie der mittelbyzantinischen Zeit Online. Berlin-Brandenburgische Akademie der Wissenschaften. Nach Vorarbeiten F. Winkelmanns erstellt (in German). Berlin and Boston: De Gruyter.
- Stephenson, Paul (2003). "The Balkan Frontier in the Year 1000". In Magdalino, Paul (ed.). Byzantium in the Year 1000. Leiden: Brill. pp. 109–133. ISBN 90-04-12097-1.
