= Nikephoros Xiphias =

Byzantine military commander

- Born: before ca. 980
- Died: after 1028
- Relatives: Alexios Xiphias (father)
- Military career
- Allegiance: Byzantine Empire
- Service years: ca. 1000–1022
- Rank: strategos
- Wars: Byzantine conquest of Bulgaria

Nikephoros Xiphias (Greek: Νικηφόρος Ξιφίας, fl. c. 1000 – 1028) was a Byzantine military commander during the reign of Emperor Basil II. He played a distinguished role in the Byzantine conquest of Bulgaria, and was instrumental in the decisive Byzantine victory at the Battle of Kleidion in 1014. In 1022 he led an unsuccessful rebellion against Basil II, and was disgraced, tonsured and exiled. He is last mentioned in 1028, when he was recalled from exile and retired to a monastery.

== Origin ==
Nikephoros Xiphias was born probably some time around or before 980, and was most likely the son of Alexios Xiphias, who served as the Catepan of Italy in 1006–08. Few members of the Xiphiai are otherwise known and the family's origin is unclear, but they most likely hailed from Asia Minor, like many other prestigious families of the military aristocracy of the period.

== Wars against Bulgaria ==
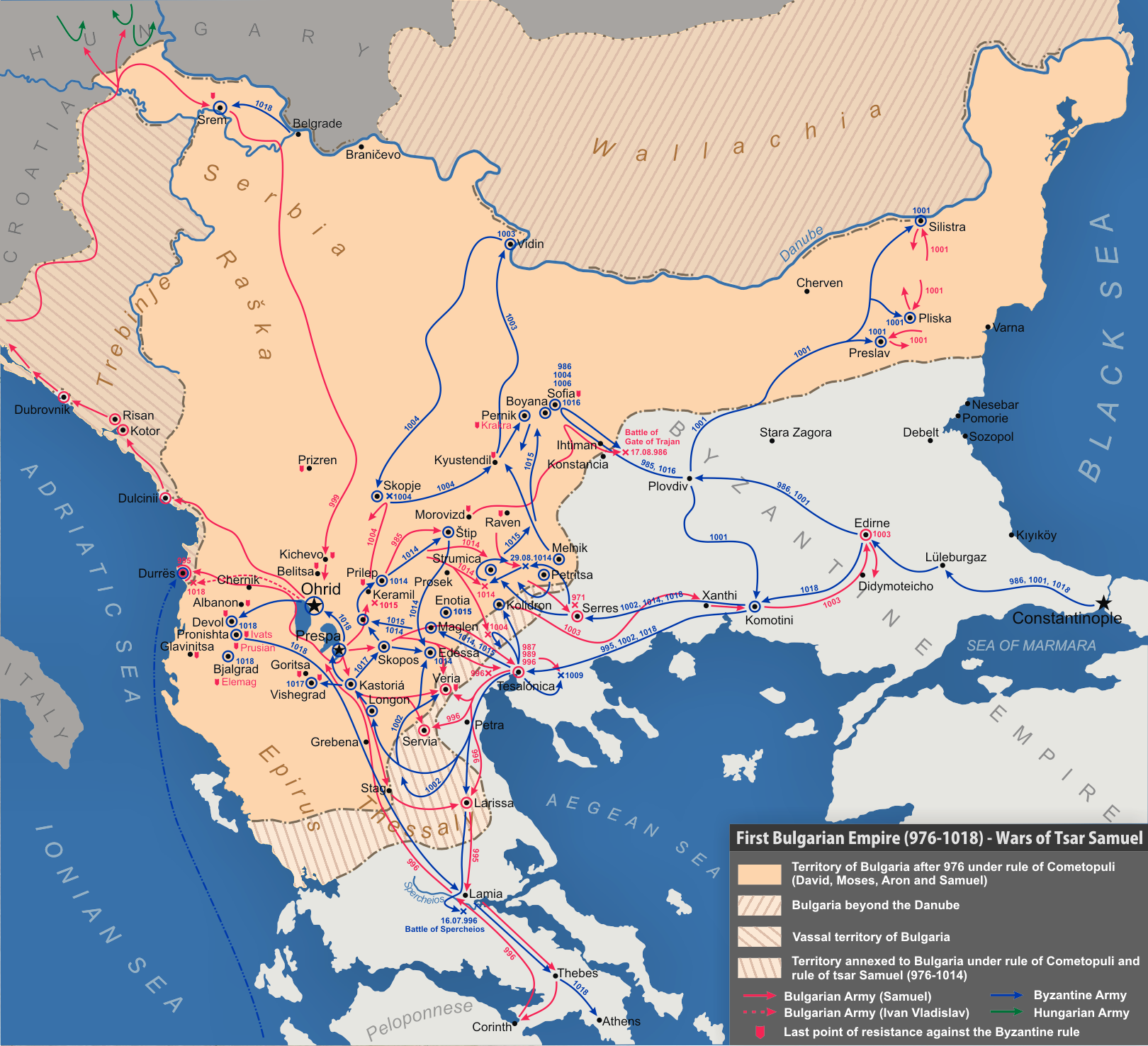
Map of the Byzantine–Bulgarian wars in the time of Emperor Basil II and Tsar Samuel of Bulgaria

Nikephoros appears for the first time in Emperor Basil II's Bulgarian wars, in 999/1000, 1000/1 or 1002, depending on the source. At the time he was a protospatharios, and along with the patrikios Theodorokanos, he commanded a campaign deep into Bulgarian lands. Setting out from Mosynopolis, the two generals crossed the Balkan Mountains and captured the old Bulgarian capitals of Pliska and Great Preslav, along with Little Preslav. They then plundered the Dobruja, left behind garrisons and returned to their base. It is unclear whether he was already the military governor (strategos) of Philippopolis at the time, or was appointed to it after the successful conclusion of the campaign, as John Skylitzes reports, when Theodorokanos, who is known to have previously held the post, retired due to his advanced age.

Xiphias is next mentioned in the Battle of Kleidion in 1014, when Basil II was attempting to force the pass known as Kleidion or Kiava Longos, which the Bulgarians under their ruler Samuil had strongly fortified. Xiphias, still strategos of Philippopolis, suggested to the Emperor to bypass the Bulgarian positions and strike them from the rear. After Basil agreed, Xiphias led a picked infantry detachment over Mount Belasica, and on 29 July 1014, led his troops on a charge on the unsuspecting Bulgarians, who panicked and broke before the unexpected attack. For this feat, which resulted in one of the most decisive victories in the long Bulgarian war, he was rewarded with promotion to the rank of patrikios. In early 1015, Xiphias, along with Constantine Diogenes, subdued the region of Moglena, which had rebelled against imperial rule. Towards the end of the same year he campaigned from Mosynopolis to the region of Triaditza (Sofia), razing its environs and capturing the fort of Boyana. Finally, in the last year of the Bulgarian war, in 1018, starting from Kastoria he subdued the remaining Bulgarian strongholds in the region of Servia.

== Conspiracy and exile ==
In 1021/22, however, Xiphias, now posted at Caesarea as strategos of the Anatolic Theme, fell out with Basil II because he was not allowed to accompany the Emperor on his campaign against the Kingdom of Georgia. Xiphias allied himself against the Emperor with the magnate Nikephoros Phokas Barytrachelos, whose father had risen in revolt in the early years of Basil II's reign. The two men planned to kill Basil, and that one of them should take his place; who it would be remained undecided, but it was mainly Phokas' name and followers that lent the conspiracy weight. The conspiracy was apparently also known and supported by King George I of Georgia, who thus hoped to force Basil to abandon his invasion. When the emperor learned of the plot, however, he did not turn back, but instead sent letters to the two rebel leaders separately, aiming to sow distrust between them. Basil's ploy bore fruit very soon, for on 15 August 1022, Xiphias assassinated Phokas. The latter's supporters dispersed, and the nascent rebellion collapsed. Xiphias was then forced to surrender to the Emperor's envoy, Theophylact Dalassenos, who became the new strategos of the Anatolics.

Brought to Constantinople, Xiphias was tonsured and banished to Antigone, one of the Princes' Islands. Following his return to the capital after his Georgian expedition, Basil II had most of his co-conspirators imprisoned and their estates confiscated. The patrikios Pherses the Iberian was executed, while two imperial chamberlains were also killed: one by Basil's own hand, and the other, who had tried to poison the Emperor, was thrown to the beasts.

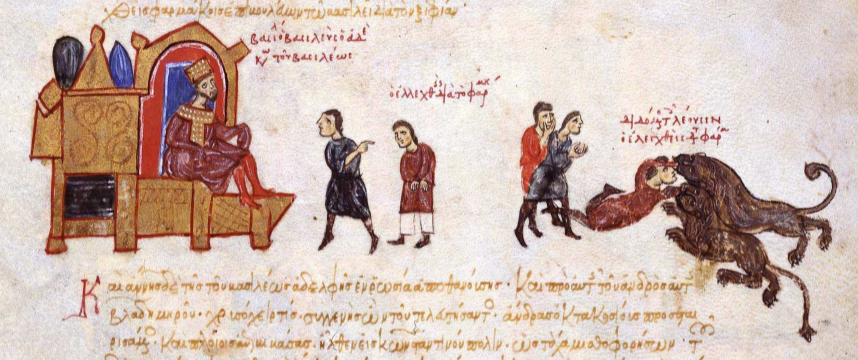
Basil II orders that the co-conspirators of Nikephoros Xiphias be thrown to the beasts.

According to the contemporary historian Yahya of Antioch, the conspirators of 1022 were released by Constantine VIII after Basil's death in 1025, but Xiphias remained in exile until 1028, when the new emperor, Romanos III, released him. Xiphias, however, was by now too old and weary, and soon retired to the Stoudios Monastery. Nothing further is known of him.

== Sources ==
- Cheynet, Jean-Claude (1990). Pouvoir et Contestations à Byzance (963–1210) (in French). Paris: Publications de la Sorbonne. ISBN 978-2-85944-168-5.
- Savvides, Alexis G. K. (1994). "Προσωπογραφικό σημείωμα για τον Βυζαντινό στρατηλάτη Νικηφόρο Ξιφία". Βυζαντινή προσωπογραφία, τοπική ιστορία και βυζαντινοτουρκικές σχέσεις (in Greek). Athens: Κριτική Ιστορική Βιβλιοθήκη. pp. 23–30. ISBN 960-218-089-7.
