= Problem of two emperors =

Problem arising when multiple people claim the title of emperor

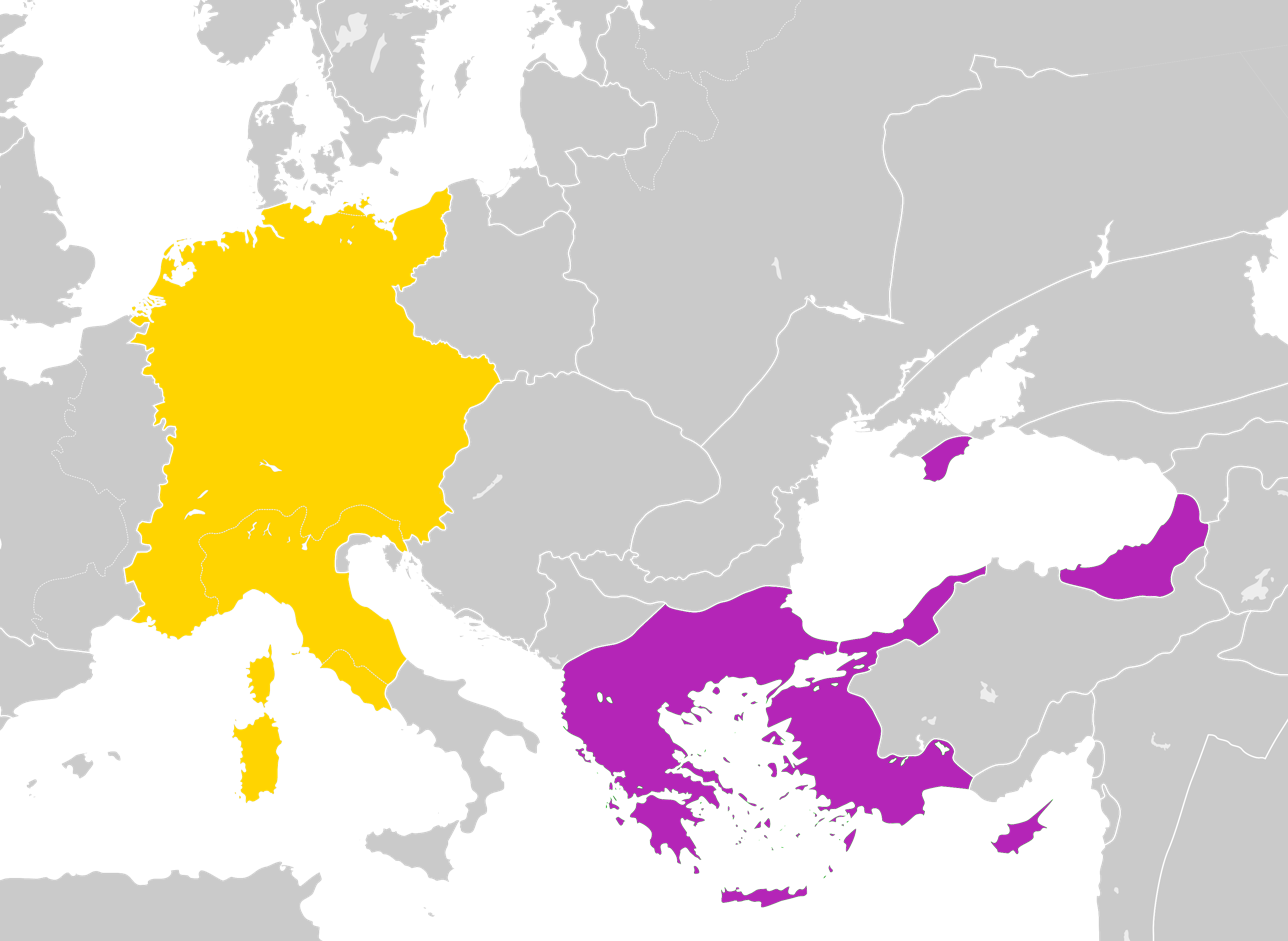
The problem of two emperors mostly concerns the medieval dispute between the rulers of the Holy Roman Empire (yellow) and the Eastern Roman Empire (purple) as to which ruler was the legitimate Roman emperor. 12th century borders.

In historiography, the problem of two emperors or two-emperor problem (deriving from the German term Zweikaiserproblem) (Note: The term was introduced in the first major treatise on the issue, by W. Ohnsorge, cf. Ohnsorge 1947.) is the historical contradiction between the idea of the universal empire, that there was only ever one true emperor at any one given time, and the truth that there were often multiple individuals who claimed the position simultaneously. The term is primarily used in regards to medieval European history and often refers to in particular the long-lasting dispute between the Byzantine emperors in Constantinople and the Holy Roman emperors in modern-day Germany and Austria as to which monarch represented the legitimate Roman emperor.

Since the collapse of the Western Roman Empire during late antiquity, the Byzantine Empire had been recognized as the legitimate Roman Empire by itself, the pope, and the various Christian kingdoms throughout Europe. This changed in 797 when Emperor Constantine VI was deposed and replaced as ruler by his mother, Empress Irene, whose rule was not accepted in Western Europe. Pope Leo III proclaimed the king of the Franks, Charlemagne, as the emperor of the Romans in 800 under the concept of translatio imperii (transfer of imperial power). Although the two empires eventually recognized each other's rulers as emperors, they never explicitly recognized the other as "Roman". Over the centuries after Charlemagne's coronation, the dispute in regards to the imperial title was one of the most contested issues in Holy Roman–Byzantine politics. On occasion, the imperial title was claimed by neighbors of the Byzantine Empire, such as Bulgaria and Serbia, which often led to military confrontations. As the Byzantine emperors had large control over the Patriarchate of Constantinople (Caesaropapism), their rivals often declared their own patriarchates independent from it.

After the Byzantine Empire was momentarily overthrown by the Catholic crusaders of the Fourth Crusade in 1204 and supplanted by the Latin Empire, the dispute continued even though both emperors now followed the same religious head for the first time since the dispute began. Though the Latin emperors recognized the Holy Roman emperors as the legitimate Roman emperors, they also claimed the title for themselves, which was not recognized by the Holy Roman Empire in return. Pope Innocent III eventually accepted the idea of divisio imperii (division of empire), in which imperial hegemony would be divided into West (the Holy Roman Empire) and East (the Latin Empire). Although the Latin Empire was destroyed by the resurgent Byzantine Empire under the Palaiologos dynasty in 1261, the Palaiologoi never reached the power of the pre-1204 Byzantine Empire and its emperors ignored the problem of two emperors in favor of closer diplomatic ties with the west. The problem of two emperors only fully resurfaced after the fall of Constantinople in 1453, after which the Ottoman sultan Mehmed II claimed the imperial dignity as Kayser-i Rûm (Caesar of the Roman Empire) and aspired to claim universal hegemony. The Ottomans called the Holy Roman emperors by the title kıral (king) for one and a half centuries, until the Sultan Ahmed I formally recognized Rudolf II as an emperor in the Peace of Zsitvatorok in 1606, an acceptance of divisio imperii, bringing an end to the dispute between Constantinople and Western Europe.

In addition to the Ottomans, the Tsardom of Russia and the later Russian Empire also claimed the Roman legacy of the Byzantine Empire, with its rulers titling themselves as tsar (deriving from "caesar") and later imperator. Their claim to the imperial title and equal status was not recognized by the Holy Roman Empire until 1745 and by the Ottoman Empire until 1774. While the Holy Roman Empire dissolved in 1806, the Russian rulers continued to claim the succession of the Byzantine Empire until 1917. The Greek Plan of the 1780s was the last serious attempt of restoring the Christian Byzantine Empire as a third empire alongside Russia and the Holy Roman Empire. By the 19th century, the title "emperor" and their variations became detached from Roman Empire with the title being regularly used by different states established under the rule of European royal dynasties including Austria (1804–1918; 1804–06 even alongside the Holy Roman emperor title), Brazil (1822–1889), Ethiopia (1936–1941), France (1804–14, 1815, 1852–70), Germany (1871–1918), India (1876–1948) and Mexico (1863–1867) with little to no reference to the Roman Empire and did not claim universal hegemony. Non-European states like in East Asia also started being referred to as "empires". The latest tsars of Bulgaria (1908–1946) and the basileis of Greece (1832–1973) were seen as kings rather than emperors.

== Background ==
=== Political background ===
The territorial evolution of the Eastern Roman Empire under each imperial dynasty until its demise in 1453

Following the fall of the Western Roman Empire in the 5th century, Roman civilization endured in the remaining eastern half of the Roman Empire, often termed by historians as the Byzantine Empire (though it self-identified simply as the "Roman Empire"). As the Roman emperors had done in antiquity, the Byzantine emperors saw themselves as universal rulers. The idea was that the world contained one empire (the Roman Empire) and one church and this idea survived despite the collapse of the empire's western provinces. Although the last extensive attempt at putting the theory back into practice had been Justinian I's wars of reconquest in the 6th century, which saw the return of Italy and Africa into imperial control, the idea of a great western reconquest remained a dream for Byzantine emperors for centuries.

Because the empire was constantly threatened at critical frontiers to its north and east, the Byzantines were unable to focus much attention to the west and Roman control would slowly disappear in the west once more. Nevertheless, their claim to the universal empire was acknowledged by temporal and religious authorities in the west, even if this empire couldn't be physically restored. Gothic and Frankish kings in the fifth and sixth centuries acknowledged the emperor's suzerainty, as a symbolic acknowledgement of membership in the Roman Empire also enhanced their own status and granted them a position in the perceived world order of the time. As such, Byzantine emperors could still perceive the west as the western part of their empire, momentarily in barbarian hands, but still formally under their control through a system of recognition and honors bestowed on the western kings by the emperor.

A decisive geopolitical turning point in the relations between East and West was during the long reign of emperor Constantine V (741–775). Though Constantine V conducted several successful military campaigns against the enemies of his empire, his efforts were centered on the Muslims and the Bulgars, who represented immediate threats. Because of this, the defense of Italy was neglected. The main Byzantine administrative unit in Italy, the Exarchate of Ravenna, fell to the Lombards in 751, ending the Byzantine presence in northern Italy. The collapse of the Exarchate had long-standing consequences. The popes, ostensibly Byzantine vassals, realized that Byzantine support was no longer a guarantee and increasingly began relying on the major kingdom in the West, the Frankish Kingdom, for support against the Lombards. Byzantine possessions throughout Italy, such as Venice and Naples, began to raise their own militias and effectively became independent. Imperial authority ceased to be exercised in Corsica and Sardinia and religious authority in southern Italy was formally transferred by the emperors from the popes to the patriarchs of Constantinople. The Mediterranean world, interconnected since the days of Roman Empire of old, had been definitively divided into East and West.

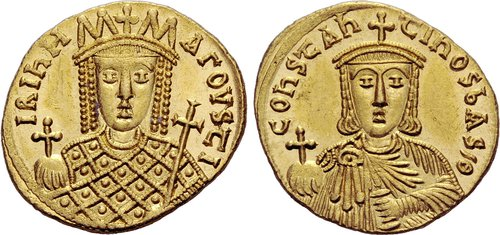
Gold solidus depicting Empress Irene (left) on the obverse, and her son Constantine VI (right) on the reverse

In 797, the young emperor Constantine VI was arrested, deposed and blinded by his mother and former regent, Irene of Athens. She then governed the empire as its sole ruler, taking the title Basileus rather than the feminine form Basilissa (used for the empresses who were wives of reigning emperors). At the same time, the political situation in the West was rapidly changing. The Frankish Kingdom had been reorganized and revitalized under King Charlemagne. Though Irene had been on good terms with the papacy prior to her usurpation of the Byzantine throne, the act soured her relations with Pope Leo III. At the same time, Charlemagne's courtier Alcuin had suggested that the imperial throne was now vacant since a woman claimed to be emperor, perceived as a symptom of the decadence of the empire in the east. Possibly inspired by these ideas and possibly viewing the idea of a woman emperor as an abomination, Pope Leo III also began to see the imperial throne as vacant. When Charlemagne visited Rome for Christmas in 800 he was treated not as one territorial ruler among others, but as the sole legitimate monarch in Europe and on Christmas Day he was proclaimed and crowned by Pope Leo III as the Emperor of the Romans.

=== Rome and the idea of the Universal Empire ===
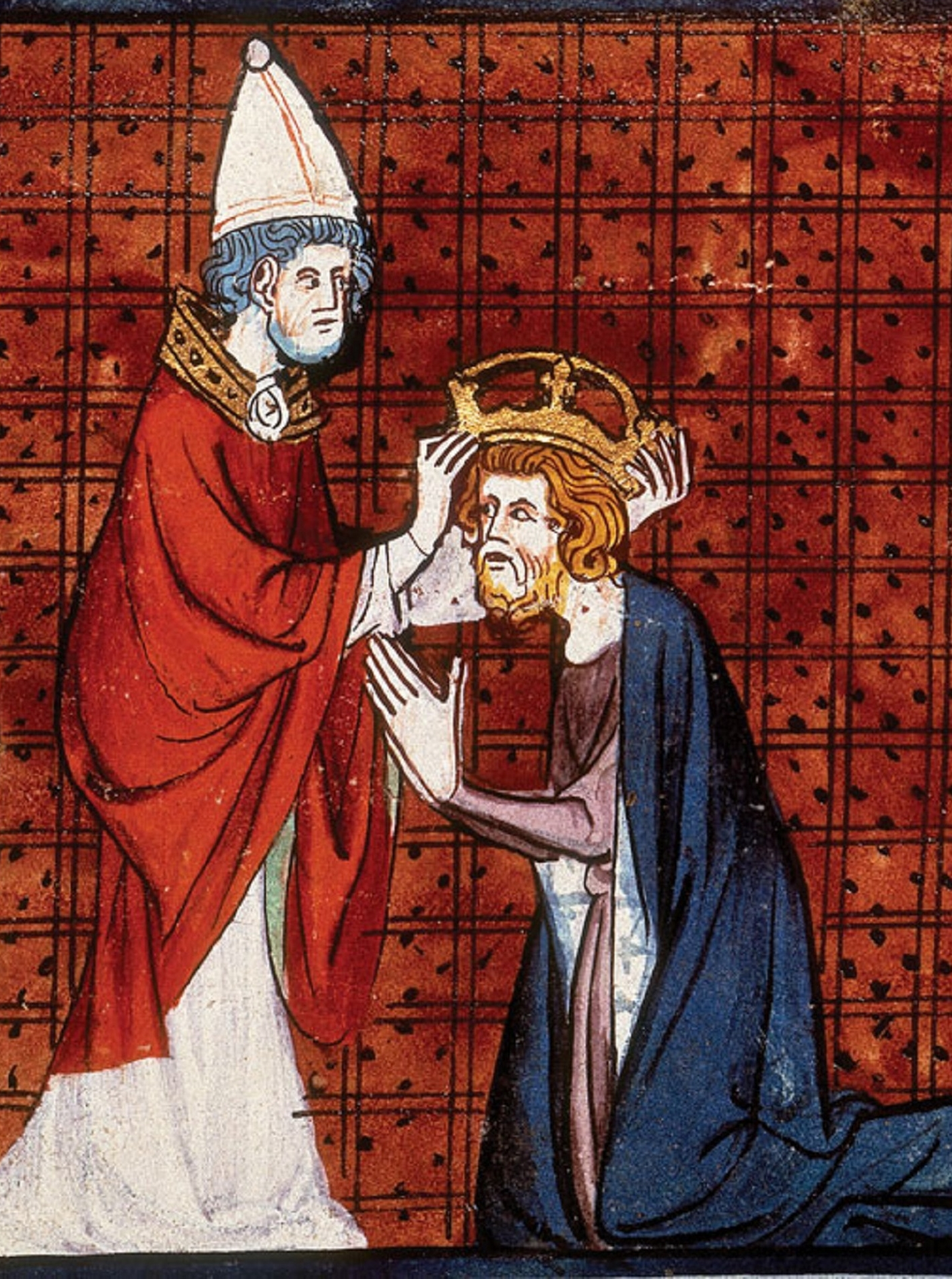
Refusing to recognize the Eastern Empire, Pope Leo III crowned Charlemagne as emperor.

Though the Roman Empire is an example of a universal monarchy, the idea is not exclusive to the Romans, having been expressed in unrelated entities such as the Aztec Empire and in earlier realms such as the Persian and Assyrian Empires.

Most "universal monarchs" justified their ideology and actions through the divine; proclaiming themselves (or being proclaimed by others) as either divine themselves or as appointed on the behalf of the divine, meaning that their rule was theoretically sanctioned by heaven. By tying together religion with the empire and its ruler, obedience to the empire became the same thing as obedience to the divine. Like its predecessors, the Ancient Roman religion functioned in much the same way, conquered peoples were expected to participate in the imperial cult regardless of their faith before Roman conquest. This imperial cult was threatened by religions such as Christianity (where Jesus Christ is explicitly proclaimed as the "Lord"), which is one of the primary reasons for the harsh persecutions of Christians during the early centuries of the Roman Empire; the religion was a direct threat to the ideology of the regime. Although Christianity eventually became the state religion of the Roman Empire in the 4th century, the imperial ideology was far from unrecognizable after its adoption. Like the previous imperial cult, Christianity now held the empire together and though the emperors were no longer recognized as gods, the emperors had successfully established themselves as the rulers of the Christian church in the place of Christ, still uniting temporal and spiritual authority.

In the Byzantine Empire, the authority of the emperor as both the rightful temporal ruler of the Roman Empire and the head of Christianity remained unquestioned until the fall of the empire in the 15th century. The Byzantines firmly believed that their emperor was God's appointed ruler and his viceroy on Earth (illustrated in their title as Deo coronatus, "crowned by God"), that he was the Roman emperor (basileus ton Rhomaion), and as such the highest authority in the world due to his universal and exclusive emperorship. The emperor was an absolute ruler dependent on no one when exercising his power (illustrated in their title as autokrator, or the Latin moderator). The Emperor was adorned with an aura of holiness and was theoretically not accountable to anyone but God himself. The Emperor's power, as God's viceroy on Earth, was also theoretically unlimited. In essence, Byzantine imperial ideology was simply a Christianization of the old Roman imperial ideology, which had also been universal and absolutist.

As the Western Roman Empire collapsed and subsequent Byzantine attempts to retain the west crumbled, the church took the place of the empire in the west and by the time Western Europe emerged from the chaos endured during the 5th to 7th centuries, the pope was the chief religious authority and the Franks were the chief temporal authority. Charlemagne's coronation as Roman emperor expressed an idea different from the absolutist ideas of the emperors in the Byzantine Empire. Though the eastern emperor retained control of both the temporal empire and the spiritual church, the rise of a new empire in the west was a collaborative effort, Charlemagne's temporal power had been won through his wars, but he had received the imperial crown from the pope. Both the emperor and the pope had claims to ultimate authority in Western Europe (the popes as the successors of Saint Peter and the emperors as divinely appointed protectors of the church) and though they recognized the authority of each other, their "dual rule" would give rise to many controversies (such as the Investiture Controversy and the rise and fall of several antipopes).

== Holy Roman–Byzantine dispute ==
=== Carolingian period ===
==== Imperial ideology ====
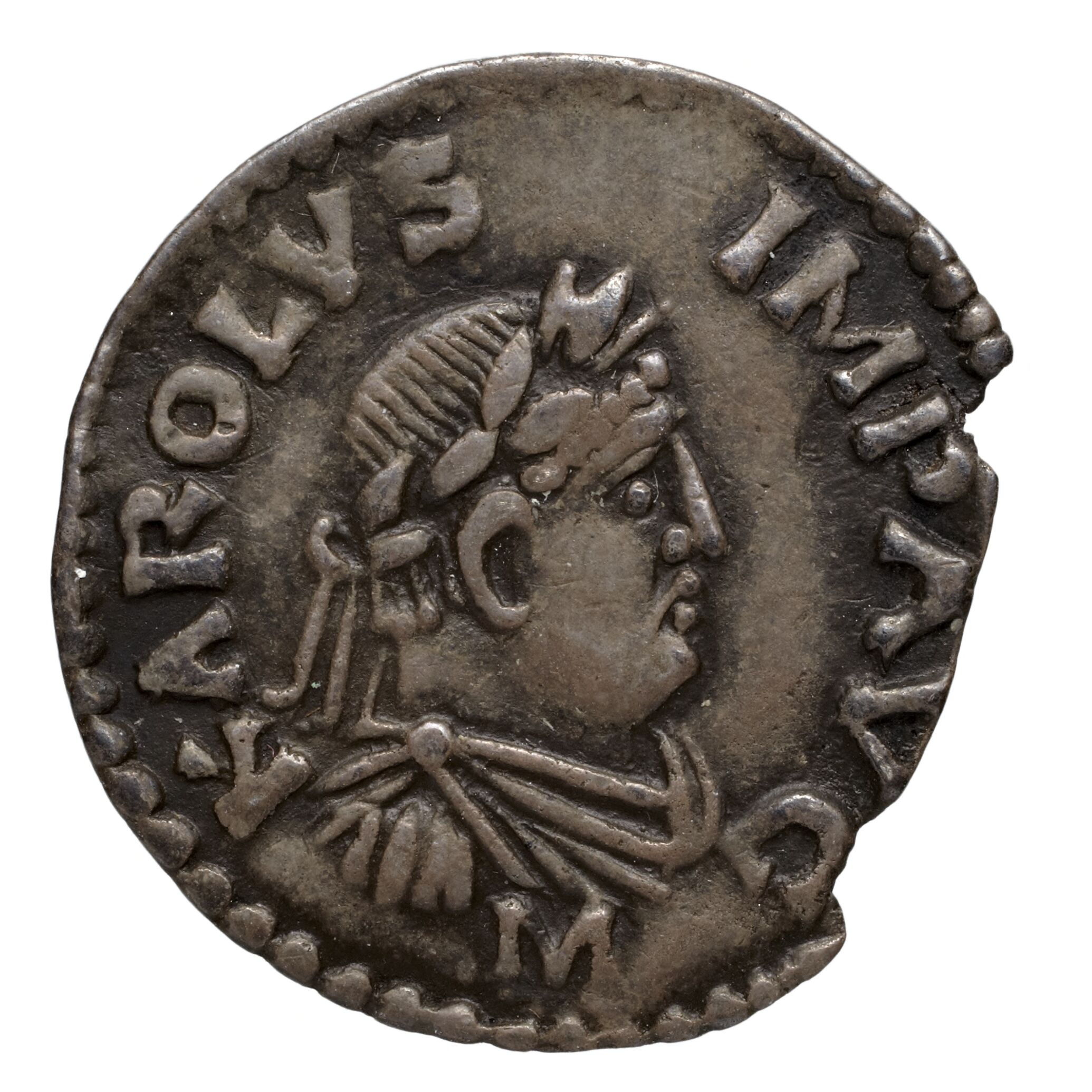
Denarius of Frankish king Charlemagne, who was crowned as Roman Emperor Karolus Imperator Augustus in the year 800 by Pope Leo III due to, and in opposition to, the Roman Empire in the East being ruled by Irene, a woman. His coronation was strongly opposed by the Eastern Empire.

Though the inhabitants of the Byzantine Empire itself never stopped referring to themselves as "Romans" (Rhomaioi), sources from Western Europe from the coronation of Charlemagne and onwards denied the Roman legacy of the eastern empire by referring to its inhabitants as "Greeks". The idea behind this renaming was that Charlemagne's coronation did not represent a division (divisio imperii) of the Roman Empire into West and East nor a restoration (renovatio imperii) of the old Western Roman Empire. Rather, Charlemagne's coronation was the transfer (translatio imperii) of the imperium Romanum from the Greeks in the east to the Franks in the west. To contemporary sources in Western Europe, such as the Annals of Lorsch, Charlemagne's key legitimizing factor as emperor (other than papal approval) was the territories which he controlled. As he controlled formerly Roman lands in Gaul, Germany and Italy (including Rome itself), and acted as a true emperor in these lands, he deserved to be called emperor, while the eastern emperor was seen as having abandoned these traditional provinces. This argument from antiquity or tradition had more longevity than Alcuin of York's argument that the Roman emperor could not be a woman and therefore was automatically vacant upon Irene of Athens' usurpation in 797, since Irene herself was deposed in 802 and followed by male rulers for the rest of Charlemagne's reign.

Although crowned as an explicit refusal of the eastern emperor's claim to universal rule, Charlemagne himself does not appear to have been interested in open confrontation with the Byzantine Empire or its rulers, and seems to have desired to eliminate the appearance of division diplomatically. When Charlemagne wrote to Constantinople in 813, Charlemagne titled himself as the "Emperor and Augustus and also King of the Franks and of the Lombards", identifying the imperial title with his previous royal titles in regards to the Franks and Lombards, rather than to the Romans. As such, his imperial title could be interpreted by the Byzantines as stemming from the fact that he was the king of more than one kingdom (equating the title of emperor with that of king of kings), rather than signifying a usurpation of Byzantine power. Nevertheless, Charlemagne's coronation was in actuality an active challenge to Byzantine imperial legitimacy and was regarded as such by the Pope.

On his coins, the name and title used by Charlemagne is Karolus Imperator Augustus and in his own documents he used Imperator Augustus Romanum gubernans Imperium ("august emperor, governing the Roman Empire") and serenissimus Augustus a Deo coronatus, magnus pacificus Imperator Romanorum gubernans Imperium ("most serene Augustus crowned by God, great peaceful emperor governing the empire of the Romans"). The identification as an "emperor governing the Roman Empire" rather than a "Roman emperor" could be seen as an attempt at avoiding the dispute and issue over who was the true emperor and attempting to keep the perceived unity of the empire intact.

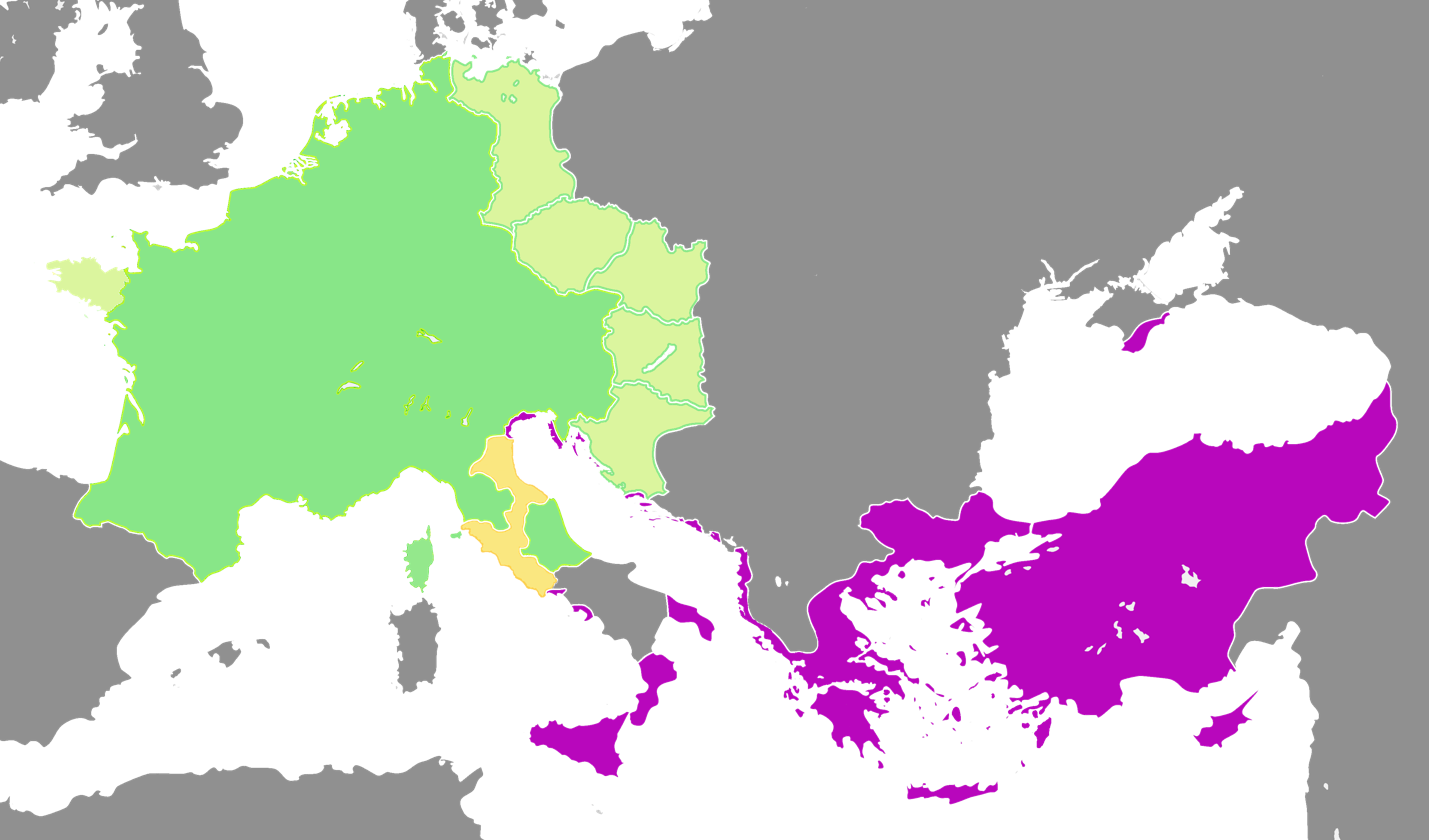
The Carolingian Empire (green) and the Byzantine Empire (purple) in 814 AD

In response to the Frankish adoption of the imperial title, the Byzantine emperors (which had previously simply used "emperor" as a title) adopted the full title of "emperor of the Romans" to make their supremacy clear. To the Byzantines, Charlemagne's coronation was a rejection of their perceived order of the world and an act of usurpation. Although Emperor Michael I (r. 811–813) eventually relented and recognized Charlemagne as an emperor and a "spiritual brother" of the eastern emperor, Charlemagne was not recognized as the Roman emperor and his imperium was seen as limited to his actual domains (as such not universal) and not as something that would outlive him (with his successors being referred to as "kings" rather than emperors in Byzantine sources).

Following Charlemagne's coronation, the two empires engaged in diplomacy with each other. The exact terms discussed are unknown and negotiations were slow but it seems that Charlemagne proposed in 802 that he and Irene would marry and unite their empires, sending ambassadors to Constantinople. As such, the empire could have "reunited" without arguments as to which ruler was the legitimate one. However, as reported by Theophanes the Confessor, the scheme was frustrated by Aetios, eunuch and favorite of Irene, who was attempting to usurp her on behalf of his brother Leo, even though Irene herself approved of the marriage proposal. The General Logothete (finance minister) Nikephoros, along with other courtiers disgruntled with Irene's financial policy and fearful of the implications of political union with the Franks through the proposed marriage, overthrew Irene and exiled her on 31 October 802 while the Frankish and papal ambassadors were still in the city, damaging Frankish-Byzantine relations once again.

==== Louis II and Basil I ====
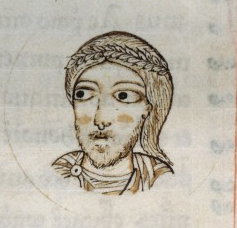
Emperor Louis II's (pictured) 871 letter to Byzantine emperor Basil I showcased that the two emperors held significantly different ideas of what it meant to be Roman.

One of the primary resources in regards to the problem of two emperors in the Carolingian period is a letter by Emperor Louis II. Louis II was the fourth emperor of the Carolingian Empire, though his domain was confined to northern Italy as the rest of the empire had fractured into several different kingdoms, though these still acknowledged Louis as the emperor. His letter was a reply to a provocative letter by Byzantine emperor Basil I. Though Basil's letter is lost, its contents can be ascertained from the known geopolitical situation at the time and Louis's reply and probably related to the ongoing co-operation between the two empires against the Muslims. The focal point of Basil's letter was his refusal to recognize Louis II as a Roman emperor.

Basil appears to have based his refusal on two main points. First of all, the title of Roman emperor was not hereditary (the Byzantines still considered it to formally be a republican office, although also tied intimately with religion) and second of all, it was not considered appropriate for someone of a gens (e.g. an ethnicity) to hold the title. The Franks, and other groups throughout Europe, were seen as different gentes but to Basil and the rest of the Byzantines, "Roman" was not a gens. Romans were defined chiefly by their lack of a gens and as such, Louis was not Roman and thus not a Roman emperor. There was only one Roman emperor, Basil himself, and though Basil considered that Louis could be an emperor of the Franks, he appears to have questioned this as well seeing as only the ruler of the Romans was to be titled basileus (emperor).

As illustrated by Louis's letter, the western idea of ethnicity was different from the Byzantine idea; everyone belonged to some form of ethnicity. Louis considered the gens romana (Roman people) to be the people who lived in the city of Rome, which he saw as having been deserted by the Byzantine Empire. All gentes could be ruled by a basileus in Louis's mind and as he pointed out, the title (which had originally simply meant "king") had been applied to other rulers in the past (notably Persian rulers). Furthermore, Louis disagreed with the notion that someone of a gens could not become the Roman emperor. He considered the gentes of Hispania (the Theodosian dynasty), Isauria (the Isaurian dynasty), and Khazaria (Leo IV) as all having provided emperors, though the Byzantines themselves would have seen all of these as Romans and not as peoples of gentes. The views expressed by the two emperors in regards to ethnicity are somewhat paradoxical; Basil defined the Roman Empire in ethnic terms (defining it as explicitly against ethnicity) despite not considering the Romans as an ethnicity and Louis did not define the Roman Empire in ethnic terms (defining it as an empire of God, the creator of all ethnicities) despite considering the Romans as an ethnic people.

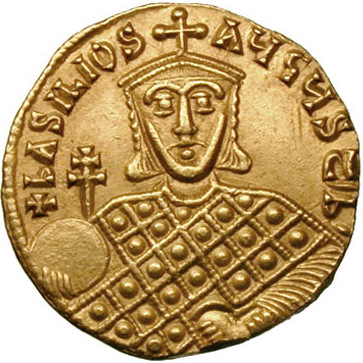
Coin of Byzantine emperor Basil I which titles him as Basilios Augustus

Louis also derived legitimacy from religion. He argued that as the Pope of Rome, who actually controlled the city, had rejected the religious leanings of the Byzantines as heretical, instead favoring the Franks, and also because the he had also crowned him emperor, Louis was the legitimate Roman emperor. The idea was that it was God himself, acting through his vicar the Pope, who had granted the church, people and city of Rome to him to govern and protect. Louis's letter details that if he was not the emperor of the Romans then he could not be the emperor of the Franks either, as it was the Roman people themselves who had accorded his ancestors with the imperial title. In contrast to the papal affirmation of his imperial lineage, Louis chastized the eastern empire for its emperors mostly only being affirmed by their senate and sometimes lacking even that, with some emperors having been proclaimed by the army, or worse, women (probably a reference to Irene). Louis probably overlooked that affirmation by the army was the original ancient source for the title of imperator, before it came to mean the ruler of the Roman Empire.

Though it would have been possible for either side of the dispute to concede to the obvious truth, that there were now two empires and two emperors, this would have denied the understood nature of what the empire was and meant (its unity). Louis's letter does offer some evidence that he might have recognized the political situation as such; Louis is referred to as the "august emperor of the Romans" and Basil is referred to as the "very glorious and pious emperor of New Rome", and he suggests that the "indivisible empire" is the empire of God and that "God has not granted this church to be steered either by me or you alone, but so that we should be bound to each other with such love that we cannot be divided, but should seem to exist as one". These references are more likely to mean that Louis still considered there to be a single empire, but with two imperial claimants (in effect an emperor and an anti-emperor). Neither side in the dispute would have been willing to reject the idea of the single empire. Louis referring to the Byzantine emperor as an emperor in the letter may simply be a courtesy, rather than an implication that he truly accepted his imperial rule.

Louis's letter mentions that the Byzantines abandoned Rome, the seat of empire, and lost the Roman way of life and the Latin language. In his view, that the empire was ruled from Constantinople did not represent it surviving, but rather that it had fled from its responsibilities. Although he would have had to approve its contents, Louis probably did not write his letter himself and it was probably instead written by the prominent cleric Anastasius Bibliothecarius. Anastasius was not a Frank but a citizen of the city of Rome (in Louis's view an "ethnic Roman"). As such, prominent figures in Rome itself would have shared Louis's views, illustrating that by his time, the Byzantine Empire and the city of Rome had drifted very far apart.

Following the death of Louis in 875, emperors continued to be crowned in the West for a few decades, but their reigns were often brief and problematic and they only held limited power and as such the problem of two emperors ceased being a major issue to the Byzantines, for a time.

=== Ottonian period ===
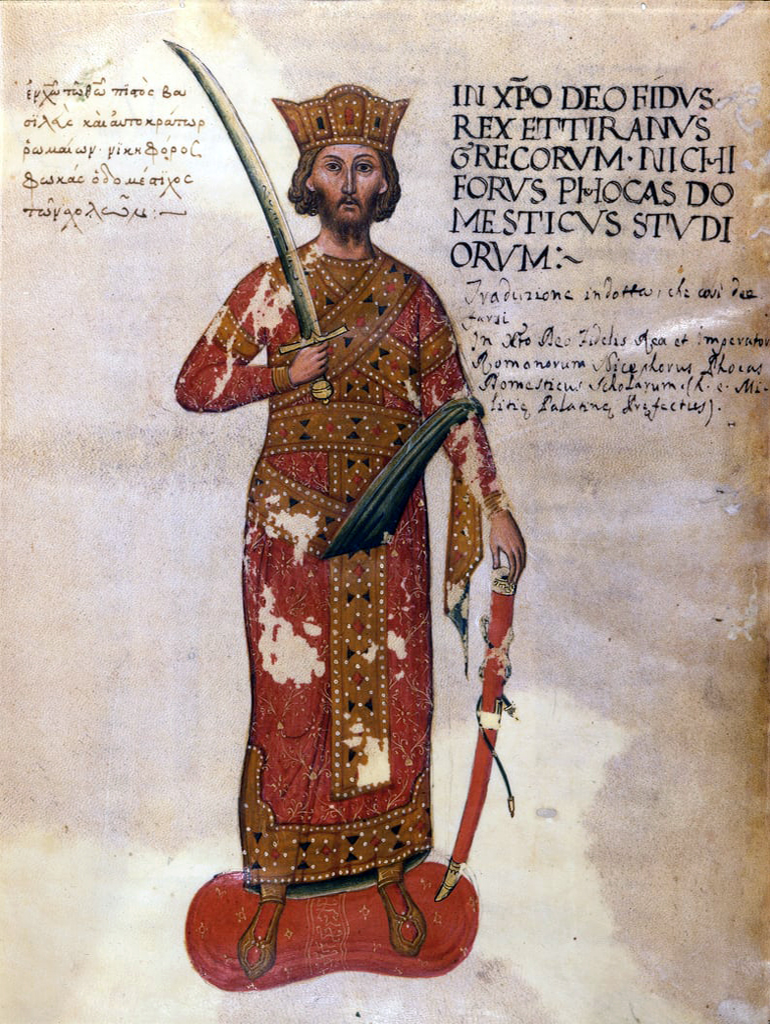
Emperor Nikephoros II Phokas (pictured) was outraged at the papal coronation of Otto I and vowed to reconquer Italy and force the pope to submit to him.

The problem of two emperors returned when Pope John XII crowned the king of Germany, Otto I, as emperor of the Romans in 962, almost 40 years after the death of the previous papally crowned emperor, Berengar. Otto's repeated territorial claims to all of Italy and Sicily (as he had also been proclaimed as the king of Italy) brought him into conflict with the Byzantine Empire. The Byzantine emperor at the time, Romanos II, appears to have more or less ignored Otto's imperial aspirations, but the succeeding Byzantine emperor, Nikephoros II, was strongly opposed to them. Otto, who hoped to secure imperial recognition and the provinces in southern Italy diplomatically through a marriage alliance, dispatched diplomatic envoys to Nikephoros in 967. To the Byzantines, Otto's coronation was a blow as, or even more, serious than Charlemagne's as Otto and his successors insisted on the Roman aspect of their imperium more strongly than their Carolingian predecessors.

Leading Otto's diplomatic mission was Liutprand of Cremona, who chastized the Byzantines for their perceived weakness; losing control of the West and thus also causing the pope to lose control of the lands which belonged to him. To Liutprand, the fact that Otto I had acted as a restorer and protector of the church by restoring the lands of the papacy (which Liutprand believed had been granted to the pope by Emperor Constantine I), made him the true emperor while the loss of these lands under preceding Byzantine rule illustrated that the Byzantines were weak and unfit to be emperors. Liutprand expresses his ideas with the following words in his report on the mission, in a reply to Byzantine officials:

My master did not by force or tyrannically invade the city of Rome; but he freed it from a tyrant, nay, from the yoke of tyrants. Did not the slaves of women rule over it; or, which is worse and more disgraceful, harlots themselves? Your power, I fancy, or that of your predecessors, who in name alone are called emperors of the Romans and are it not in reality, was sleeping at that time. If they were powerful, if emperors of the Romans, why did they permit Rome to be in the hands of harlots? Were not some of them most holy popes banished, others so oppressed that they were not able to have their daily supplies or the means of giving alms? Did not Adalbert send scornful letters to the emperors Romanus and Constantine your predecessors? Did he not plunder the churches of the most holy apostles? What one of you emperors, led by zeal for God, took care to avenge so unworthy a crime and to bring back the holy church to its proper conditions? You neglected it, my master did not neglect it. For, rising from the ends of the earth and coming to Rome, he removed the impious and gave back to the vicars of the holy apostles their power and all their honor...

Nikephoros pointed out to Liutprand personally that Otto was a mere barbarian king who had no right to call himself an emperor, nor to call himself a Roman. Just before Liutprand's arrival in Constantinople, Nikephoros II had received an offensive letter from Pope John XIII, possibly written under pressure from Otto, in which the Byzantine emperor was referred to as the "Emperor of the Greeks" and not the "Emperor of the Romans", denying his true imperial status. Liutprand recorded the outburst of Nikephoros's representatives at this letter, which illustrates that the Byzantines too had developed an idea similar to translatio imperii regarding the transfer of power from Rome to Constantinople:

Hear then! The silly pope does not know that the holy Constantine transferred hither the imperial sceptre, the senate, and all the Roman knighthood, and left in Rome nothing but vile minions – fishers, namely, pedlars, bird catchers, bastards, plebeians, slaves.

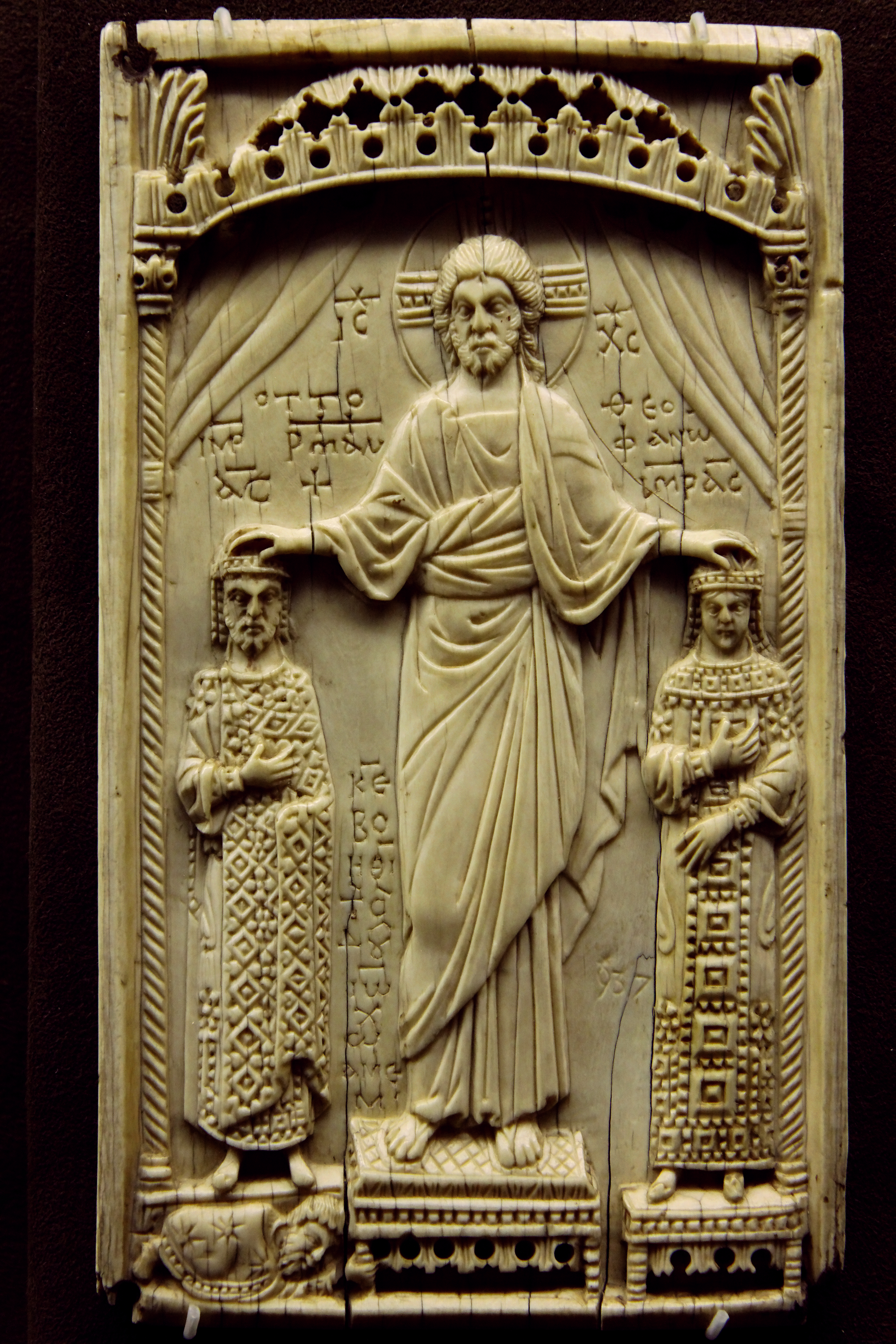
10th century ivory book cover inspired by Byzantine art depicting Holy Roman Emperor Otto II and his wife, Empress Theophanu

Liutprand attempted to diplomatically excuse the pope by stating that the pope had believed that the Byzantines would not like the term "Romans" since they had moved to Constantinople and changed their customs and assured Nikephoros that in the future, the eastern emperors would be addressed in papal letters as "the great and august emperor of the Romans". Otto's attempted cordial relations with the Byzantine Empire would be hindered by the problem of the two emperors, and the eastern emperors were less than eager to reciprocate his feelings. Liutprand's mission to Constantinople was a diplomatic disaster, and his visit saw Nikephoros repeatedly threaten to invade Italy, restore Rome to Byzantine control and on one occasion even threaten to invade Germany itself, stating (concerning Otto) that "we will arouse all the nations against him; and we will break him in pieces like a potter's vessel". Otto's attempt at a marriage alliance would not materialize until after Nikephoros's death. In 972, in the reign of Byzantine emperor John I Tzimiskes, a marriage was secured between Otto's son and co-emperor Otto II and John's niece Theophanu.

Though Emperor Otto I briefly used the title imperator augustus Romanorum ac Francorum ("august emperor of Romans and Franks") in 966, the style he used most commonly was simply Imperator Augustus. Otto leaving out any mention of Romans in his imperial title may be because he wanted to achieve the recognition of the Byzantine emperor. Following Otto's reign, mentions of the Romans in the imperial title became more common. In the 11th century, the German king (the title held by those who were later crowned emperors) was referred to as the rex Romanorum ("king of the Romans") and in the century after that, the standard imperial title was dei gratia Romanorum Imperator semper Augustus ("by the Grace of God, emperor of the Romans, ever august").

=== Hohenstaufen period ===
To Liutprand of Cremona and later scholars in the west, the eastern emperors were perceived as weak, degenerate, and not true emperors; there was, they felt, a single empire under the true emperors (Otto I and his successors), who demonstrated their right to the empire through their restoration of the Church. In return, the eastern emperors did not recognize the imperial status of their challengers in the west. Although Michael I had referred to Charlemagne by the title Basileus in 812, he hadn't referred to him as the Roman emperor. Basileus in of itself was far from an equal title to that of Roman emperor. In their own documents, the only emperor recognized by the Byzantines was their own ruler, the Emperor of the Romans. In Anna Komnene's The Alexiad (c. 1148), the Emperor of the Romans is her father, Alexios I, while the Holy Roman emperor Henry IV is titled simply as the "King of Germany". According to Arnold of Lübeck, when King of Romans Conrad III met Byzantine emperor Manuel I Komnenos in 1147 (who he calls "King of the Greeks"), (Note: regi Grecorum, qui etiampropternimium fastum divitiarum suarum imperatorem the king of the Greeks, who, even out of the extreme pride of his wealth, calls himself emperor — Arnold of Lübeck, Arnoldi Chronica Slavorum, Latin^{:25f.} German^{:23}) Conrad III refused to submit to Manuel I so they rode to each other and gave each other a welcoming kiss. The accuracy of the account remains disputed.

In the 1150s, the Byzantine emperor Manuel I Komnenos became involved in a three-way struggle between himself, the Holy Roman emperor Frederick I Barbarossa and the Italo-Norman King of Sicily, Roger II. Manuel aspired to lessen the influence of his two rivals and at the same time win the recognition of the Pope (and thus by extension Western Europe) as the sole legitimate emperor, which would unite Christendom under his sway. Manuel reached for this ambitious goal by financing a league of Lombard towns to rebel against Frederick and encouraging dissident Norman barons to do the same against the Sicilian king. Manuel even dispatched his army to southern Italy, the last time a Byzantine army ever set foot in Western Europe. Despite his efforts, Manuel's campaign ended in failure and he won little except the hatred of both Barbarossa and Roger, who by the time the campaign concluded had allied with each other.

==== Frederick Barbarossa's crusade ====
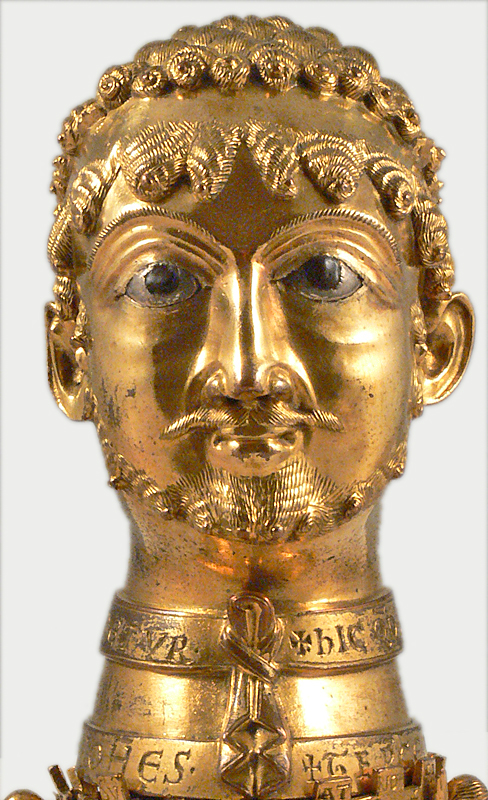
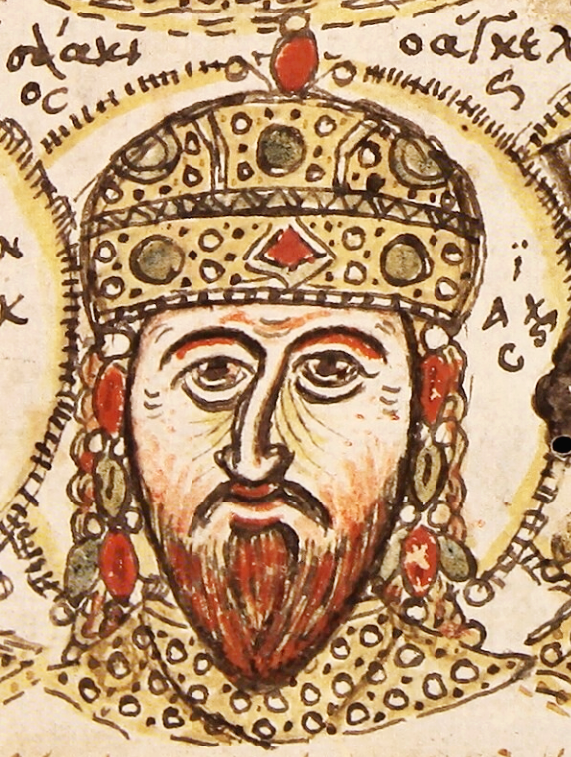
The choice of the Holy Roman emperor Frederick I Barbarossa (left) to march through the Byzantine Empire during the Third Crusade in 1189 caused the Byzantine emperor, Isaac II Angelos (right), to panic and nearly caused a full-scale war between the Byzantine Empire and Western Christianity.

Soon after the conclusion of the Byzantine–Norman wars in 1185, the Byzantine emperor Isaac II Angelos received word that a Third Crusade had been called due to Sultan Saladin's 1187 conquest of Jerusalem. Isaac learnt that Barbarossa, a known foe of his empire, was to lead a large contingent in the footprints of the First and Second crusades through the Byzantine Empire. Isaac II interpreted Barbarossa's march through his empire as a threat and considered it inconceivable that Barbarossa did not also intend to overthrow the Byzantine Empire. As a result of his fears, Isaac II imprisoned numerous Latin citizens in Constantinople. In his treaties and negotiations with Barbarossa (which exist preserved as written documents), Isaac II was insincere as he had secretly allied with Saladin to gain concessions in the Holy Land and had agreed to delay and destroy the German army.

Barbarossa, who did not in fact intend to take Constantinople, was unaware of Isaac's alliance with Saladin but still wary of the rival emperor. As such he sent out an embassy in early 1189, headed by the Bishop of Münster. Isaac was absent at the time, putting down a revolt in Philadelphia, and returned to Constantinople a week after the German embassy arrived, after which he immediately had the Germans imprisoned. This imprisonment was partly motivated by Isaac wanting to possess German hostages, but more importantly, an embassy from Saladin, probably noticed by the German ambassadors, was also in the capital at this time.

On 28 June 1189, Barbarossa's crusade reached the Byzantine borders, the first time a Holy Roman emperor personally set foot within the borders of the Byzantine Empire. Although Barbarossa's army was received by the closest major governor, the governor of Branitchevo, the governor had received orders to stall or, if possible, destroy the German army. On his way to the city of Niš, Barbarossa was repeatedly assaulted by locals under the orders of the governor of Branitchevo and Isaac II also engaged in a campaign of closing roads and destroying foragers. The attacks against Barbarossa amounted to little and only resulted in around a hundred losses. A more serious issue was a lack of supplies, since the Byzantines refused to provide markets for the German army. The lack of markets was excused by Isaac as due to not having received advance notice of Barbarossa's arrival, a claim rejected by Barbarossa, who saw the embassy he had sent earlier as notice enough. Despite these issues, Barbarossa still apparently believed that Isaac was not hostile against him and refused invitations from the enemies of the Byzantines to join an alliance against them. While at Niš he was assured by Byzantine ambassadors that though there was a significant Byzantine army assembled near Sofia, it had been assembled to fight the Serbs and not the Germans. This was a lie, and when the Germans reached the position of this army, they were treated with hostility, though the Byzantines fled at the first charge of the German cavalry.

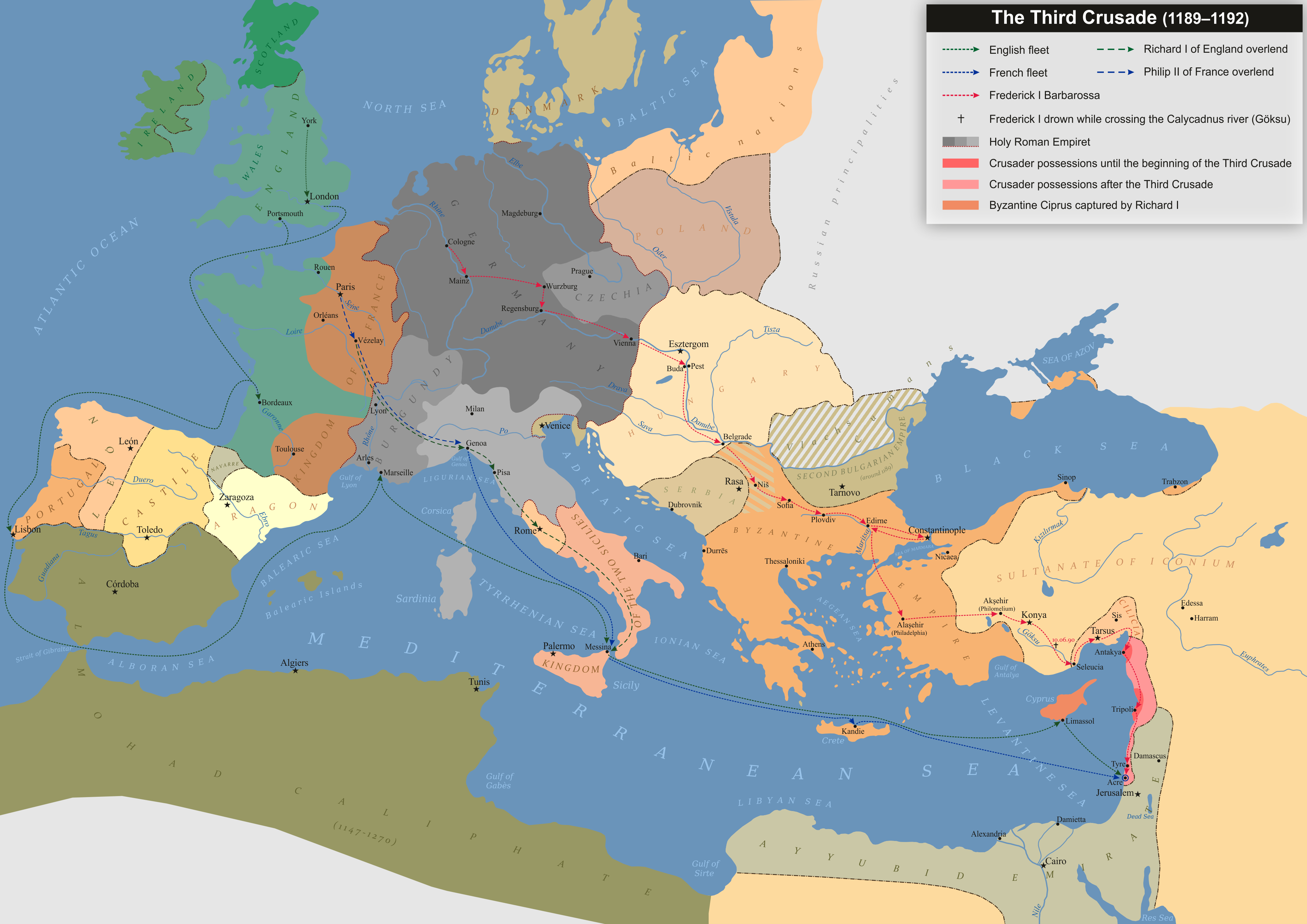
Path of the Third Crusade (1189–1192), Emperor Frederick Barbarossa's path in red

Isaac II panicked and issued contradictory orders to the governor of the city of Philippopolis, one of the strongest fortresses in Thrace. Fearing that the Germans were to use the city as a base of operations, its governor, Niketas Choniates (later a major historian of these events), was first ordered to strengthen the city's walls and hold the fortress at all costs, but later to abandon the city and destroy its fortifications. Isaac II seems to have been unsure of how to deal with Barbarossa. Barbarossa meanwhile wrote to the main Byzantine commander, Manuel Kamytzes, that "resistance was in vain", but also made clear that he had absolutely no intention to harm the Byzantine Empire. On 21 August, a letter from Isaac II reached Barbarossa, who was encamped outside Philippopolis. In the letter, which caused great offense, Isaac II explicitly called himself the "Emperor of the Romans" in opposition to Barbarossa's title and the Germans also misinterpreted the Byzantine emperor as calling himself an angel (on account of his last name, Angelos). Furthermore, Isaac II demanded half of any territory to be conquered from the Muslims during the crusade and justified his actions by claiming that he had heard from the governor of Branitchevo that Barbarossa had plans to conquer the Byzantine Empire and place his son Frederick of Swabia on its throne. At the same time Barbarossa learnt of the imprisonment of his earlier embassy. Several of Barbarossa's barons suggested that they take immediate military action against the Byzantines, but Barbarossa preferred a diplomatic solution.

In the letters exchanged between Isaac II and Barbarossa, neither side titled the other in the way they considered to be appropriate. In his first letter, Isaac II referred to Barbarossa simply as the "King of Germany". The Byzantines eventually realized that the "wrong" title hardly improved the tense situation and in the second letter Barbarossa was called "the most high-born Emperor of Germany". Refusing to recognize Barbarossa as the Roman emperor, the Byzantines eventually relented with calling him "the most noble emperor of Elder Rome" (as opposed to the New Rome, Constantinople). The Germans always referred to Isaac II as the Greek emperor or the Emperor of Constantinople.

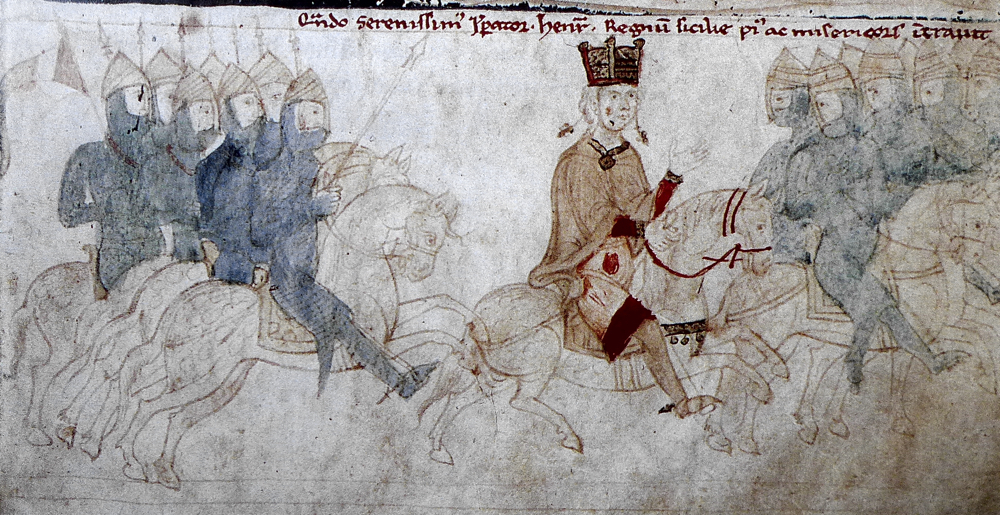
Emperor Frederick Barbarossa depicted during the Third Crusade

The Byzantines continued to harass the Germans. The wine left behind in the abandoned city of Philippopolis had been poisoned, and a second embassy sent from the city to Constantinople by Barbarossa was also imprisoned, though shortly thereafter Isaac II relented and released both embassies. When the embassies reunited with Barbarossa at Philippopolis they told the Holy Roman emperor of Isaac II's alliance with Saladin, and claimed that the Byzantine emperor intended to destroy the German army while it was crossing the Bosporus. In retaliation for spotting anti-Crusader propaganda in the surrounding region, the crusaders devastated the immediate area around Philippopolis, slaughtering the locals. After Barbarossa was addressed as the "King of Germany", he flew into a fit of rage, demanding hostages from the Byzantines (including Isaac II's son and family), asserting that he was the one true Emperor of the Romans and made it clear that he intended to winter in Thrace despite the Byzantine emperor's offer of assisting the German army to cross the Bosporus.

By this point, Barbarossa had become convinced that Constantinople needed to be conquered in order for the crusade to be successful. On 18 November he sent a letter to his son, Henry, in which he explained to difficulties he had encountered and ordered his son to prepare for an attack against Constantinople, ordering the assembling of a large fleet to meet him in the Bosporus once spring came. Furthermore, Henry was instructed to ensure Papal support for such a campaign, organizing a great Western crusade against the Byzantines as enemies of God. Isaac II replied to Barbarossa's threats by claiming that Thrace would be Barbarossa's "deathtrap" and that it was too late for the German emperor to escape "his nets". As Barbarossa's army, reinforced with Serbian and Vlach allies, approached Constantinople, Isaac II's resolve faded and he began to favor peace instead. Barbarossa had continued to send offers of peace and reconciliation since he had seized Philippopolis, and once Barbarossa officially sent a declaration of war in late 1189, Isaac II at last relented, realizing he wouldn't be able to destroy the German army and was at risk of losing Constantinople itself. The peace saw the Germans being allowed to pass freely through the empire, transportation across the Bosporus and the opening of markets as well as compensation for the damage done to Barbarossa's expedition by the Byzantines. Frederick then continued on towards the Holy Land without any further major incidents with the Byzantines, with the exception of the German army almost sacking the city of Philadelphia after its governor refused to open up the markets to the Crusaders. The incidents during the Third Crusade heightened animosity between the Byzantine Empire and the west. To the Byzantines, the devastation of Thrace and efficiency of the German soldiers had illustrated the threat they represented, while in the West, the mistreatment of the emperor and the imprisonment of the embassies would be long remembered.

==== Threats of Henry VI ====
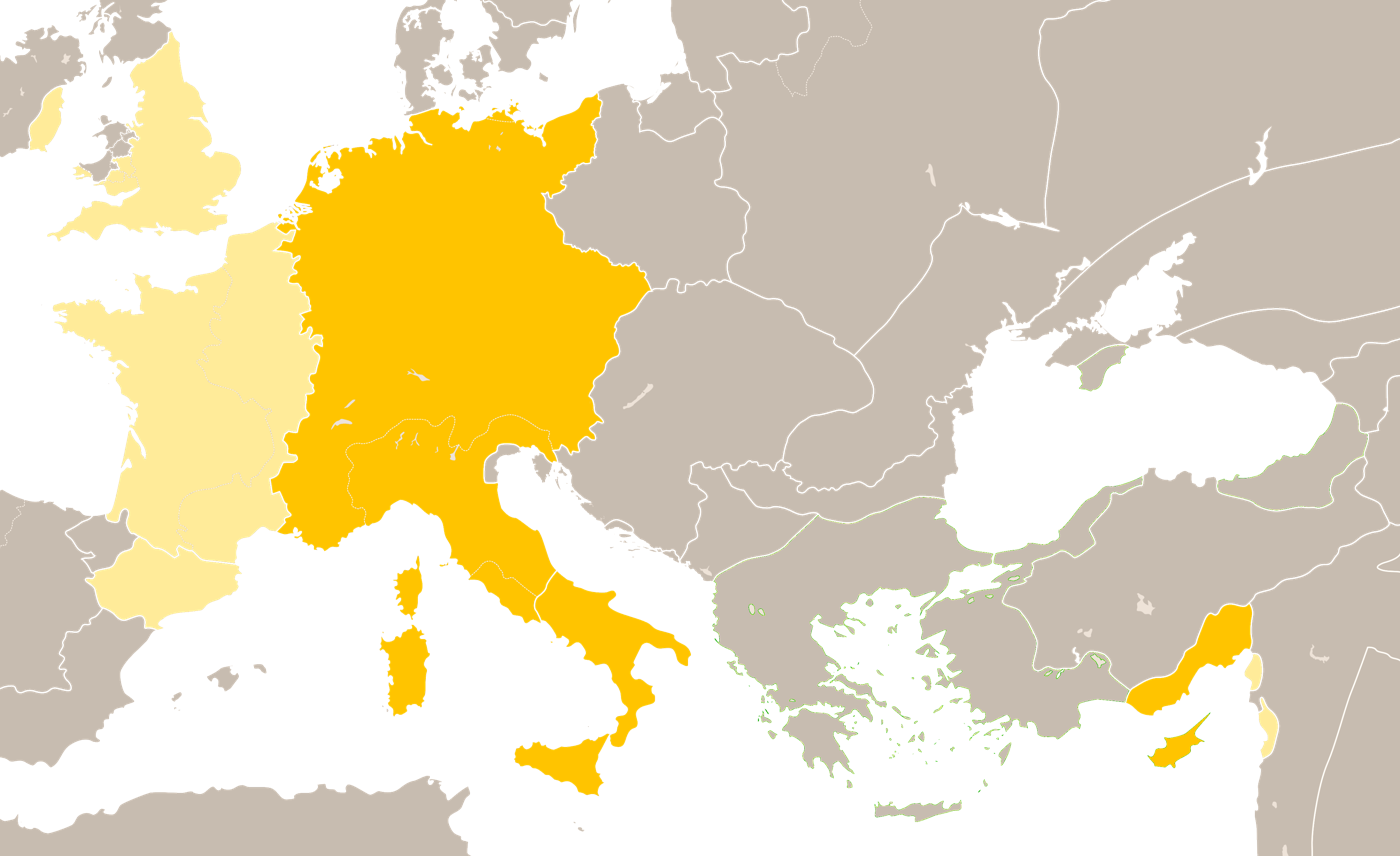
Emperor Henry VI nearly succeeded in uniting Christendom under his own sway, ruling all of Germany and Italy as Holy Roman emperor and King of Sicily, formally vassalizing the kingdoms of Cyprus and Cilician Armenia and receiving recognitions of suzerainty by the kingdoms of England, France, the Crown of Aragon and the Crusader states in the Levant. He also extracted tribute from the Byzantine Empire, which he might have aspired to eventually conquer.

Frederick Barbarossa died before reaching the Holy Land and his son and successor, Henry VI, pursued a foreign policy in which he aimed to force the Byzantine court to accept him as the superior (and sole legitimate) emperor. By 1194, Henry had successfully consolidated Italy under his own rule after being crowned as King of Sicily, in addition to already being the Holy Roman emperor and the King of Italy, and he turned his gaze east. The Muslim world had fractured after Saladin's death and Barbarossa's crusade had revealed the Byzantine Empire to be weak and also given a useful casus belli for attack. Furthermore, Leo II, the ruler of Cilician Armenia, offered to swear fealty to Henry VI in exchange for being accorded a royal crown. Henry bolstered his efforts against the eastern empire by marrying a captive daughter of Isaac II, Irene Angelina, to his brother Philip of Swabia in 1195, giving his brother a dynastic claim that could prove useful in the future.

In 1195 Henry VI also dispatched an embassy to the Byzantine Empire, demanding from Isaac II that he transfer a stretch of land stretching from Durazzo to Thessalonica, previously conquered by the Sicilian king William II, and also wished the Byzantine emperor to promise naval support in preparation for a new crusade. According to Byzantine historians, the German ambassadors spoke as if Henry VI was the "emperor of emperors" and "lord of lords". Henry VI intended to force the Byzantines to pay him to ensure peace, essentially extracting tribute, and his envoys put forward the grievances that the Byzantines had caused throughout Barbarossa's reign. Not in a position to resist, Isaac II succeeded to modify the terms so that they were purely monetary. Shortly after agreeing to these terms, Isaac II was overthrown and replaced as emperor by his older brother, Alexios III Angelos.

Henry VI successfully compelled Alexios III as well to pay tribute to him under the threat of otherwise conquering Constantinople on his way to the Holy Land. Henry VI had grand plans of becoming the leader of the entire Christian world. Although he would only directly rule his traditional domains, Germany and Italy, his plans were that no other empire would claim ecumenical power and that all Europe was to recognize his suzerainty. His attempt to subordinate the Byzantine Empire to himself was just one step in his partially successful plan of extending his feudal overlordship from his own domains to France, England, Aragon, Cilician Armenia, Cyprus and the Holy Land. Based on the establishment of bases in the Levant and the submission of Cilician Armenia and Cyprus, it is possible that Henry VI really considered invading and conquering the Byzantine Empire, thus uniting the rivalling empires under his rule. This plan, just as Henry's plan of making the position of emperor hereditary rather than elective, ultimately never transpired as he was kept busy by internal affairs in Sicily and Germany.

The threat of Henry VI caused some concern in the Byzantine Empire and Alexios III slightly altered his imperial title to en Christoi to theo pistos basileus theostephes anax krataios huspelos augoustos kai autokrator Romaion in Greek and in Christo Deo fidelis imperator divinitus coronatus sublimis potens excelsus semper augustus moderator Romanorum in Latin. Though previous Byzantine emperors had used basileus kai autokrator Romaion ("Emperor and Autocrat of the Romans"), Alexios III's title separated basileus from the rest and replaced its position with augoustos (Augustus, the old Roman imperial title), creating the possible interpretation that Alexios III was simply an emperor (Basileus) and besides that also the moderator Romanorum ("Autocrat of the Romans") but not explicitly the Roman emperor, so that he was no longer in direct competition with his rival in Germany and that his title was less provocative to the West in general. Alexios III's successor, Alexios IV Angelos, continued with this practice and went even further, inverting the order of moderator Romanorum and rendering it as Romanorum moderator.

==== The Latin Empire ====
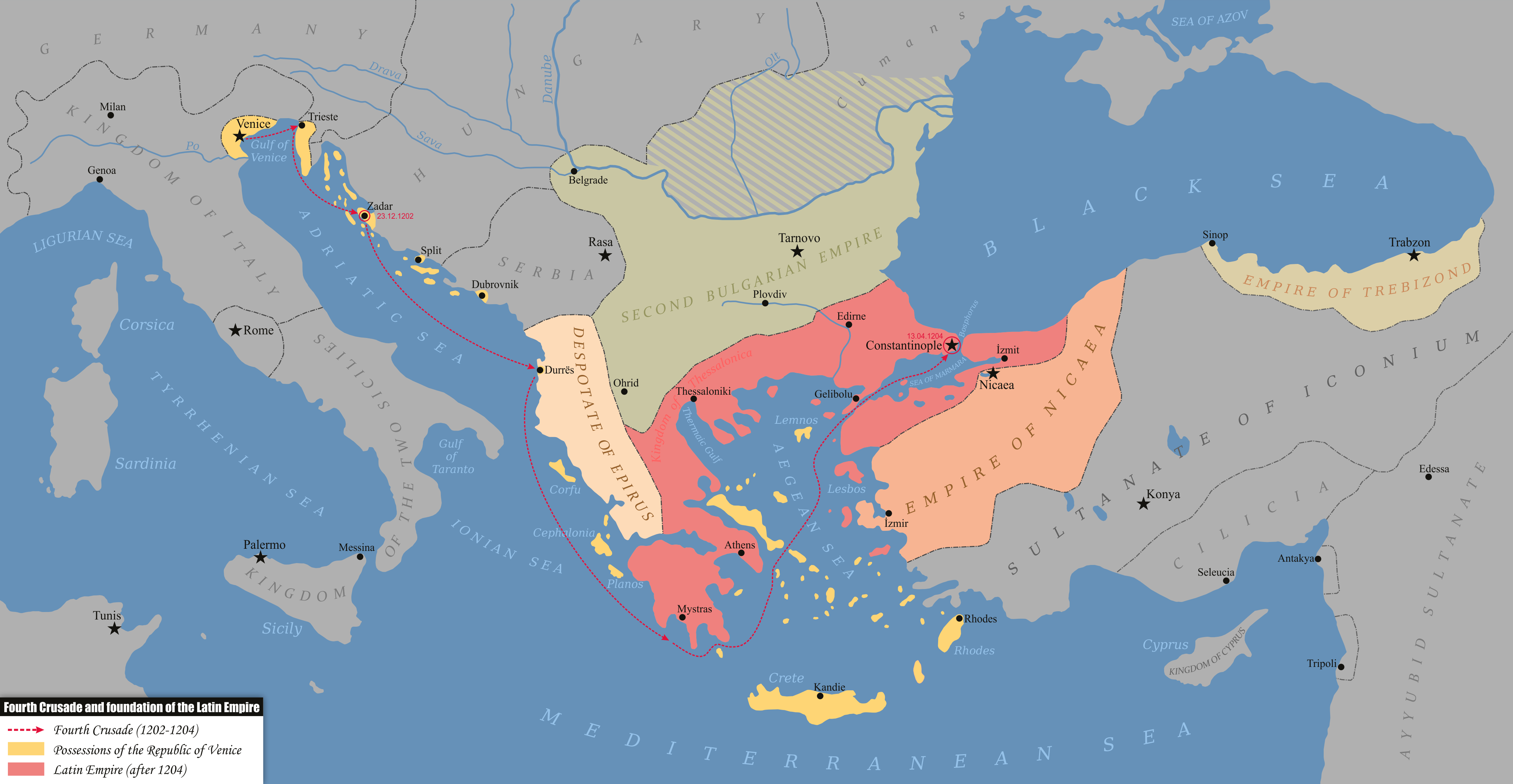
The path of the Fourth Crusade (1202–1204) and the political situation within the borders of the former Byzantine Empire after its victory

A series of events and the intervention of Venice led to the Fourth Crusade (1202–1204) sacking Constantinople instead of attacking its intended target, Egypt. When the crusaders seized Constantinople in 1204, they founded the Latin Empire and called their new realm the imperium Constantinopolitanum, the same term used for the Byzantine Empire in Papal correspondence. This suggests that, although they had placed a new Catholic emperor, Baldwin I, on the throne of Constantinople and changed the administrative structure of the empire into a feudal network of counties, duchies and kingdoms, the crusaders viewed themselves as taking over the Byzantine Empire rather than replacing it with a new entity. Notably Baldwin I was designated as an emperor, not a king. This is despite the fact that the crusaders, as Western Christians, would have recognized the Holy Roman Empire as the true Roman Empire and its ruler as the sole true emperor and that founding treaties of the Latin Empire explicitly designate the empire as in the service of the Roman Catholic Church. In 1204, Thomas Morosini was elected first Latin Patriarch of Constantinople, while the Greek Orthodox Patriarch fled to Bulgaria and after his death a successor was elected in Nicaea.

The rulers of the Latin Empire, although they seem to have called themselves Emperors of Constantinople (imperator Constantinopolitanus) or Emperors of Romania (imperator Romaniae, Romania being a Byzantine term meaning the "land of the Romans") in correspondence with the Papacy, used the same imperial titles within their own empire as their direct Byzantine predecessors, with the titles of the Latin Emperors (Dei gratia fidelissimus in Christo imperator a Deo coronatus Romanorum moderator et semper augustus) being near identical to the Latin version of the title of Byzantine emperor Alexios IV (fidelis in Christo imperator a Deo coronatus Romanorum moderator et semper augustus). As such, the titles of the Latin emperors continued the compromise in titulature worked out by Alexios III. In his seals, Baldwin I abbreviated Romanorum as Rom., a convenient and slight adjustment that left it open to interpretation if it truly referred to Romanorum or if it meant Romaniae.

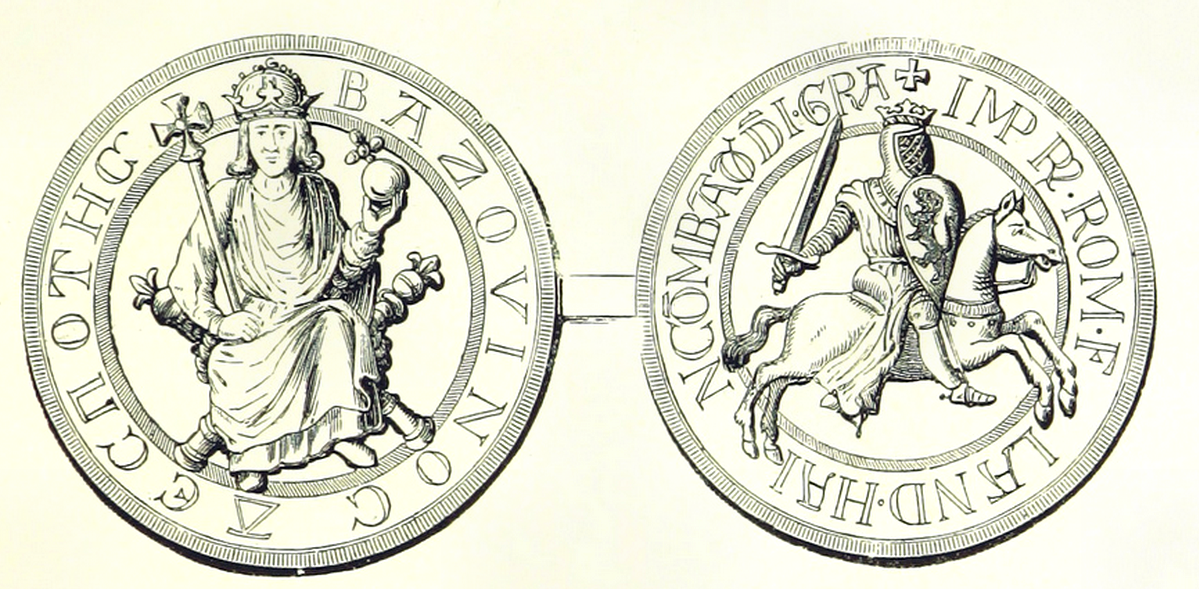
Seal of Baldwin I, the first Latin Emperor. The abbreviation Rom. conveniently leaves it open to interpretation if he refers to Romaniae ("Romania") or Romanorum ("the Romans").

The Latin Emperors saw the term Romanorum or Romani in a new light, not seeing it as referring to the Western idea of "geographic Romans" (inhabitants of the city of Rome) but not adopting the Byzantine idea of the "ethnic Romans" (Greek-speaking citizens of the Byzantine Empire) either. Instead, they saw the term as a political identity encapsulating all subjects of the Roman emperor, i.e. all the subjects of their multi-national empire (whose ethnicities encompassed Latins, "Greeks", Armenians and Bulgarians).

The embracing of the Roman nature of the emperorship in Constantinople would have brought the Latin emperors into conflict with the idea of translatio imperii. Furthermore, the Latin emperors claimed the dignity of Deo coronatus (as the Byzantine emperors had claimed before them), a dignity the Holy Roman emperors could not claim, being dependent on the Pope for their coronation. Despite the fact that the Latin emperors would have recognized the Holy Roman Empire as the Roman Empire, they nonetheless claimed a position that was at least equal to that of the Holy Roman emperors. In 1207–1208, Latin emperor Henry proposed to marry the daughter of the elected rex Romanorum in the Holy Roman Empire, Henry VI's brother Philip of Swabia, yet to be crowned emperor due to an ongoing struggle with the rival claimant Otto of Brunswick. Philip's envoys responded that Henry was an advena (stranger; outsider) and solo nomine imperator (emperor in name only) and that the marriage proposal would only be accepted if Henry recognized Philip as the imperator Romanorum and suus dominus (his master). As no marriage occurred, it is clear that submission to the Holy Roman emperor was not considered an option.

The emergence of the Latin Empire and the submission of Constantinople to the Catholic Church as facilitated by its emperors altered the idea of translatio imperii into what was called divisio imperii (division of empire). The idea, which became accepted by Pope Innocent III, saw the formal recognition of Constantinople as an imperial seat of power and its rulers as legitimate emperors, which could rule in tandem with the already recognized emperors in the West. The idea resulted in that the Latin emperors never attempted to enforce any religious or political authority in the West, but attempted to enforce a hegemonic religious and political position, similar to that held by the Holy Roman emperors in the West, over the lands in Eastern Europe and the Eastern Mediterranean, especially in regards to the Crusader states in the Levant, where the Latin emperors would oppose the local claims of the Holy Roman emperors and claims of Bulgarian or Greek Orthodox monarchs.

Holy Roman Emperor Frederick II later formed an alliance with their rival, John III Doukas Vatatzes of the Nicene Empire against the Papal State which had been in conflict with. Frederick II deposed John of Brienne, who would soon become co-emperor of the Latin Empire, as the King of Jerusalem in 1225. John of Brienne launched a crusade with papal support against the Hohenstaufen-held Kingdom of Sicily in 1229 and become Latin Emperor soon after. Frederick II gained a claim to the defunct Frankish Kingdom of Thessalonica in 1230 which might indicate further ambitions in the Agean maybe connected to earlier Siculo-Norman ambitions. He reportedly supported the Nicene claim to Constantinople and helped John III against a crusade planned by Pope Gregory IX following a Nicaean-Bulgarian siege of Constantinople. According to Philippe Mouskes, John III offered him vassalage if Frederick II conquered Constantinople for him and expelled Latin Emperor Baldwin II to France. Such arrangement is seen as unlikely and Frederick II rather addressed him as his equal avoiding the term vassal which he had been using for Italian lords and cities but it is seen as probably that John III provided military help in exchange for his claims. The Latin Empire was politically unstable. The Greek Orthodox population resisted the new government and sympathized with the new Greek rump states and the Slavic-speaking Second Bulgarian Empire and Kingdom of Serbia, which tried to profit of the weakness of the Latin Empire or even conquer Constantinople, which eventually happened in 1261.

=== Restoration of the Byzantine Empire ===
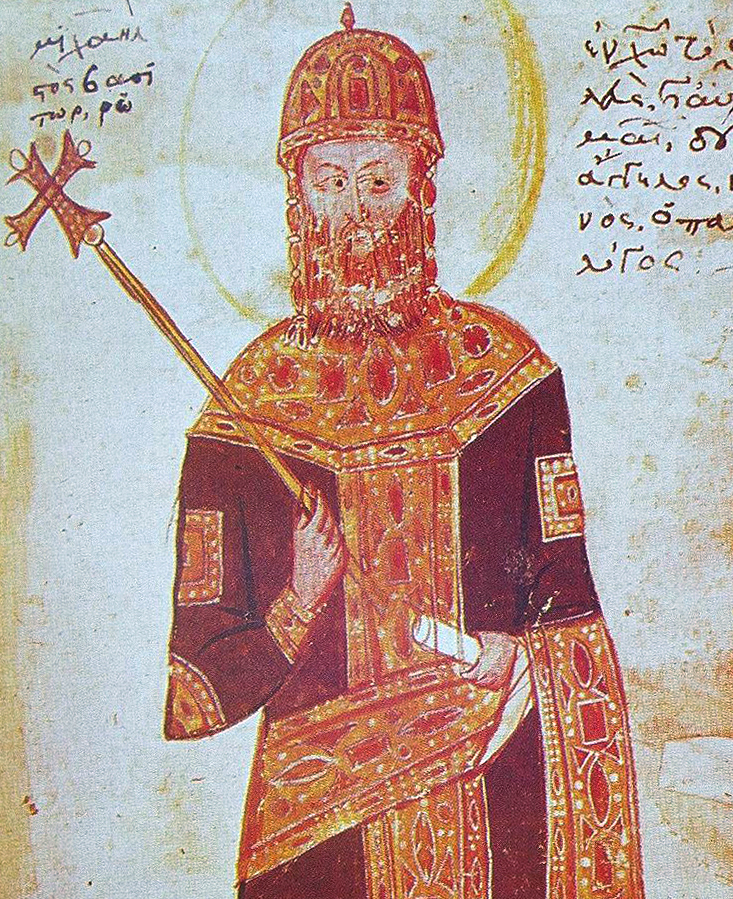
Emperor Michael VIII Palaiologos recaptured Constantinople from the Latin Empire in 1261. Michael and his dynasty would pursue a policy of reconciliation with the west, much to the dismay of their subjects.

With the Byzantine reconquest of Constantinople in 1261 under Emperor Michael VIII Palaiologos, the Papacy suffered a loss of prestige and endured severe damage to its spiritual authority. Once more, the easterners had asserted their right not only to the position of Roman emperor but also to a church independent of the one centered in Rome. The popes who were active during Michael's reign all pursued a policy of attempting to assert their religious authority over the Byzantine Empire. As Michael was aware that the popes held considerable sway in the west (and wishing to avoid a repeat of the events of 1204), he dispatched an embassy to Pope Urban IV immediately after taking possession of the city. The two envoys were immediately imprisoned once they sat foot in Italy: one was flayed alive and the other managed to escape back to Constantinople. From 1266 to his death in 1282, Michael would repeatedly be threatened by the King of Sicily, Charles of Anjou, who aspired to restore the Latin Empire and periodically enjoyed Papal support. Meanwhile in the Holy Roman Empire, there had been no emperor during this time period. Pope Innocent IV officially deposed emperor Frederick II with his bull Ad apostolicae dignitatis apicem in 1245 but Frederick II rejected the legitimacy of the bull. Following his death in 1250, the Interregnum started which lasted until the election of Rudolf of the House of Habsburg in 1273 to King of the Romans. The next king crowned to be emperor was Henry VII in 1312, 92 years after the coronation of Frederick II.

Michael VIII and his successors, the Palaiologan dynasty, aspired to reunite the Eastern Orthodox Church with the Church of Rome, chiefly because Michael recognized that only the Pope could constrain Charles of Anjou. To this end, Byzantine envoys were present at the Second Council of Lyons in 1274, where the Church of Constantinople was formally reunified with Rome, restoring communion after more than two centuries. On his return to Constantinople, Michael was taunted with the words "you have become a Frank", which remains a term in Greek to taunt converts to Catholicism to this day. The Union of the Churches aroused passionate opposition from the Byzantine people, the Orthodox clergy, and even within the imperial family itself. Michael's sister Eulogia, and her daughter Anna, wife of the ruler of Epirus Nikephoros I Komnenos Doukas, were among the chief leaders of the anti-Unionists. Nikephoros, his half-brother John I Doukas of Thessaly, and even the Emperor of Trebizond, John II Megas Komnenos, soon joined the anti-Unionist cause and gave support to the anti-Unionists fleeing Constantinople.

Nevertheless, the Union achieved Michael's main aim: it legitimized Michael and his successors as rulers of Constantinople in the eyes of the west. Furthermore, Michael's idea of a crusade to recover the lost portions of Anatolia received positive reception at the council, though such a campaign would never materialize. The union was disrupted in 1281 when Michael was excommunicated, possibly due to Pope Martin IV having been pressured by Charles of Anjou. Following Michael's death, and with the threat of an Angevin invasion having subsided following the Sicilian Vespers, his successor, Andronikos II Palaiologos, was quick to repudiate the hated Union of the Churches. Although popes after Michael's death would periodically consider a new crusade against Constantinople to once more impose Catholic rule, no such plans materialized. The Angevin pretenders of the Latin throne held on to the nominal sovereigns over Frankish Greece namely Achaea, Albania, Athens and Naxos.

Although Michael VIII, unlike his predecessors, did not protest when addressed as the "Emperor of the Greeks" by the popes in letters and at the Council of Lyons, his conception of his universal emperorship remained unaffected. As late as 1395, when Constantinople was more or less surrounded by the rapidly expanding Ottoman Empire and it was apparent that its fall was a matter of time, Patriarch Antony IV of Constantinople still referenced the idea of the universal empire in a letter to the Grand Prince of Moscow, Vasily I, stating that anyone other than the Byzantine emperor assuming the title of "emperor" was "illegal" and "unnatural".

Faced with the Ottoman danger, Michael's successors, prominently John V and Manuel II, periodically attempted to restore the Union, much to the dismay of their subjects. At the Council of Florence in 1439, Emperor John VIII reaffirmed the Union in the light of imminent Turkish attacks on what little remained of his empire. To the Byzantine citizens themselves, the Union of the Churches, which had assured the promise of a great western crusade against the Ottomans, was a death warrant for their empire. John VIII had betrayed their faith and as such their entire imperial ideology and world view. The promised crusade, the fruit of John VIII's labor, ended only in disaster as it was defeated by the Turks at the Battle of Varna in 1444.

The last claimant to the Latin Empire James of Baux transferred his title to Louis I of Anjou in 1383 who has not use it either because of his failed conquest of Naples. Around his death the Avenings lost control over both remaining footholds in Greece, namely Achaea and Durazzo in Albania. Only a few Capetians like Marie of Blois (for her son) and king Charles VIII of France had some plans to regain their former dominions. Similarly, the last claimant to the Byzantine throne Andreas Palaiologos transferred his title to Charles VIII and again testimonially to Ferdinand II of Aragon and Isabella I of Castile but neither of them actively used the title with Charles IX of France stopping the usage all together and the Spanish Crown falling to the Habsburgs.

== Eastern disputes ==
=== Byzantine–Bulgarian dispute ===
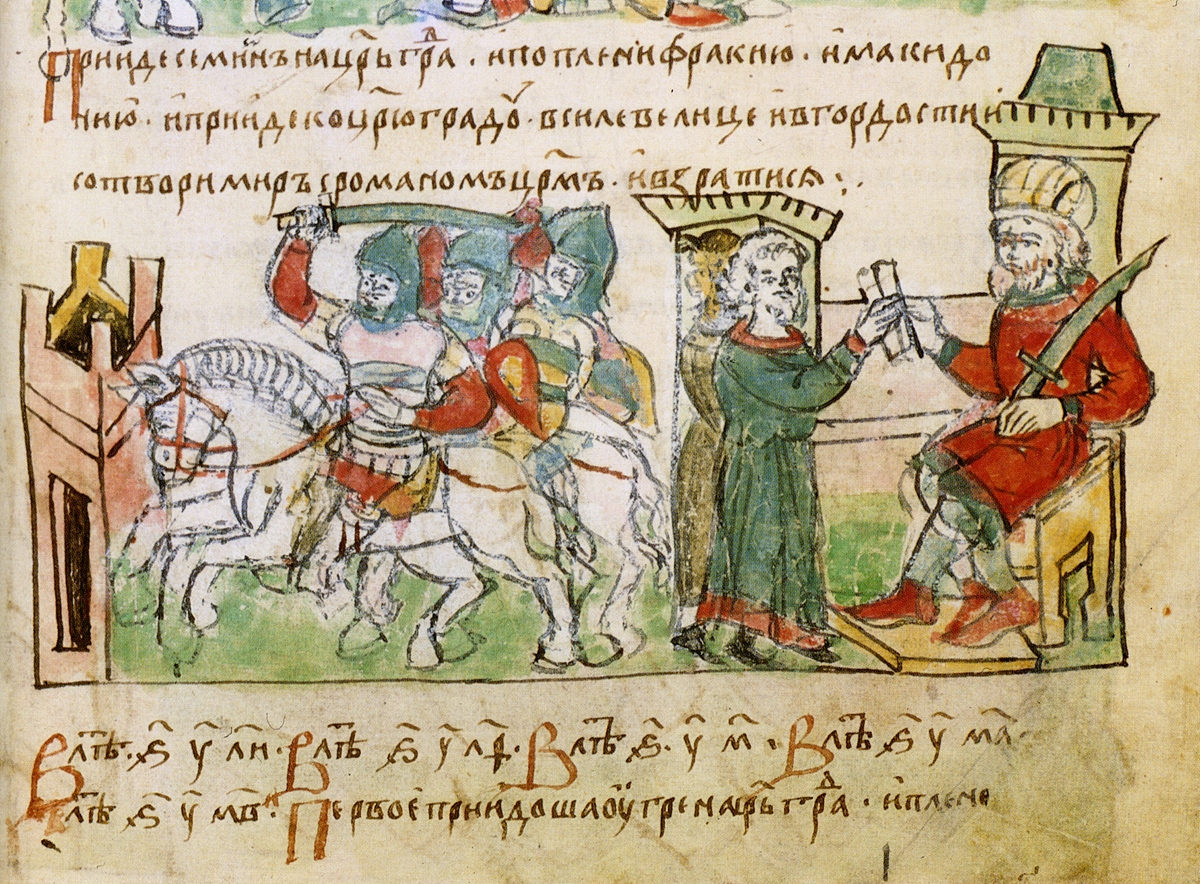
Romanos I Lekapenos negotiating with Simeon I of Bulgaria, 15th-century miniature from the Radziwiłł Chronicle

The dispute between the Byzantine Empire and the Holy Roman Empire was mostly confined to the realm of diplomacy, never fully exploding into open war. This was probably mainly due to the great geographical distance separating the two empires; a large-scale campaign would have been infeasible to undertake for either emperor. Events in Germany, France and the west in general were of little compelling interest to the Byzantines as they firmly believed that the western provinces would eventually be reconquered. Of more compelling interest were political developments in their near vicinity and in 913, the Knyaz (prince or king) of Bulgaria, Simeon I, arrived at the walls of Constantinople with an army. Simeon I's demands were not only that Bulgaria would be recognized as independent from the Byzantine Empire, but that it was to be designated as a new universal empire, absorbing and replacing the universal empire of Constantinople. Because of the threat represented, the Patriarch of Constantinople, Nicholas Mystikos, granted an imperial crown to Simeon. Simeon was designated as the Caesar of the Bulgarians, not of the Romans and as such, the diplomatic gesture had been somewhat dishonest. Caesar had been replaced by Basileus and later other titles and devalued in Byzantium over the years as it was granted to different people like Tervel of Bulgaria who helped Emperor Justinian II in 695–715. In 919, Archbishop Leontius of Bulgaria was unilaterally elevated to "patriarch". It was widely seen that the status of the church had to be "equal" of that of the state.

The Byzantines soon discovered that Simeon was in fact titling himself as not only the Caesar of the Bulgarians, but as the Basileus of the Bulgarians and the Romans. The problem was solved when Simeon died in 927 and his son and successor, Peter I, simply adopted Emperor of the Bulgarians as a show of submission to the universal empire of Constantinople. Byzantine emperor Romanos I Lekapenos recognized the Bulgarian patriarchate soon after thus the Bulgarian Church became the sixth patriarchate joining the older five. By 1018, Bulgaria was conquered by the Byzantines and the tsardom was restored over a century later in 1186. The dispute, deriving from Simeon's claim, would on occasion be revived by strong Bulgarian monarchs who once more adopted the title of Emperor of the Bulgarians and the Romans, such as Kaloyan (r. 1196–1207) and Ivan Asen II (r. 1218–1241).

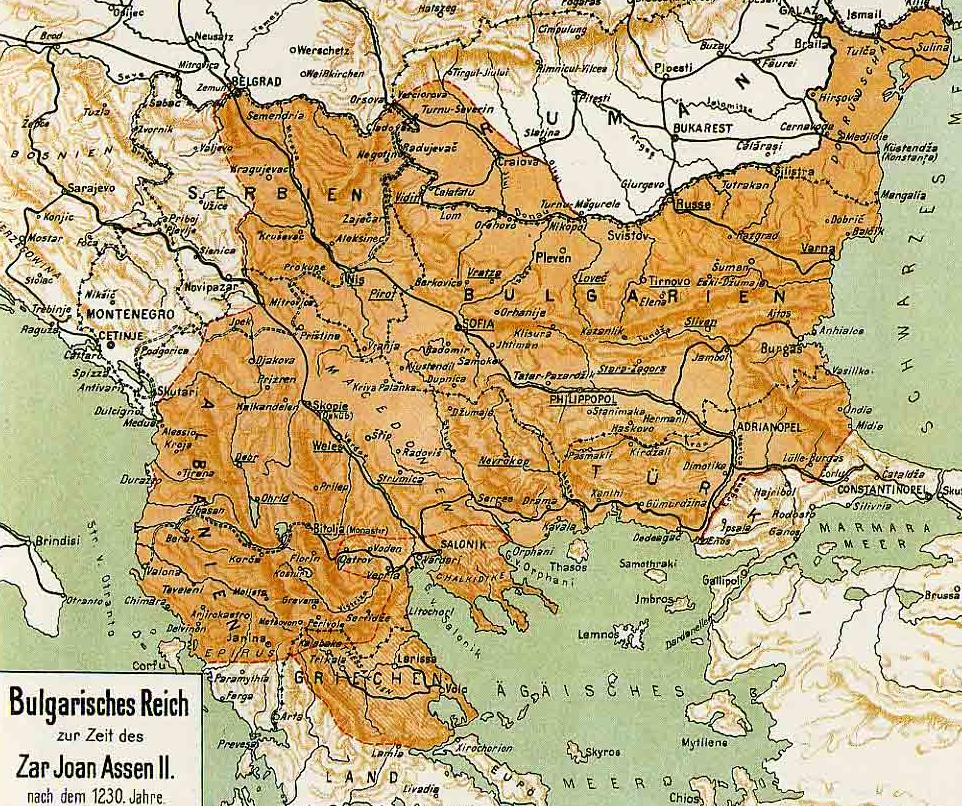
The borders of Bulgaria after the Battle of Klokotnitsa (1230)

In 1202, Emperor Alexios III Angelos was willing to accept Kaloyan as an emperor and restore the Bulgarian Patriarchate if he stopped his negotiations with Rome. Kaloyan attempted to receive recognition by Pope Innocent III as emperor, but Innocent addressed him only as dominus Bulgarorum et Blachorum instead of imperator and offered to provide a cardinal to crown him simply as king (which would be equivalent to kral') but he would continue to claim the title imperator. The papacy could not accept a third empire and only saw Bulgaria as a member of the family of Christian kingdoms under papal guidance equal to the Kingdom of Hungary. In 1204, the archbishop Basil I of Bulgarian Church, which regained its autocephaly from the Patriarchate of Constantinople in 1186, was elevated to Primas of All Bulgaria and Wallachia by the pope who argued that primas is equal to patriarch but still refused to officially recognize it as such. The Latin Emperors were less pragmatic than the Byzantines and probably did not recognize the Bulgarian claim as they saw the Eastern Empire as indivisible. Hopes of a potential reconciliation with the Latins ended with the attack on Adrianople in 1205. In an inscription in the Holy Forty Martyrs Church following the Battle of Klokotnitsa, Ivan Asen II refers to Thessalonican emperor Theodore Komnenos Doukas as "tsar". In the same inscription, the Bulgarian tsar claimed that the "Franks" have "no tsar but [him]", which John Van Antwerp Fine Jr. interpreted as considering gaining the regency over Latin Emperor Baldwin II. Ivan Asen II suggested a betrothal between his daughter Elena and Baldwin II and promised to return the territories occupied by Theodore to the Latins. The Latin nobility who saw this as a surrender to the Bulgarians rejected the proposal. In the 1230s, Nicene emperor John III Doukas Vatatzes forged an alliance with Ivan Asen II against the Latins by marrying his son Theodore to Elena. In 1235, the Bulgarian Church ended its communion with the Latin Church in exchange for the establishment of the Tarnovo Patriarchate. The same year, they launched an unsuccessful joint siege on Constantinople. John III then moved to an alliance with Holy Roman Emperor Frederick II.

The dispute was also momentarily revived by the rulers of Serbia in 1346 with Stefan Dušan's coronation as Emperor of the Serbs and Romans during the Second Palaiologan Civil War. The same year, the an independent Patriarchate was established leading to a schism with Constantinople, which lasted until 1375. Following his death, the Serbian Empire was divided between his son Stefan Uroš V and his half-brother Simeon Uroš who established a rival empire in Epirus and Thessaly. By 1371, the empire disintegrated into small states and the Serbian rulers gave the title up. After Ivan Asen II's death in 1241, the Bulgarian Empire began to decline. In the 1370s, tsar Ivan Shishman of Bulgaria who resided in Tarnovo became an Ottoman vassal and in 1393, his realm fell into direct Ottoman control. Another rump state nicknamed the Tsardom of Vidin was created in the 1360s to avoid a succession crisis. It was ruled by Ivan Sratsimir of Bulgaria, a half-brother of Ivan Shishman. Vidin split from the Tarnovo Patriarchate and returned to the Patriarchate of Constantinople. This tsardom was conquered by the Ottomans in 1396.

=== Byzantine–Georgian dispute ===
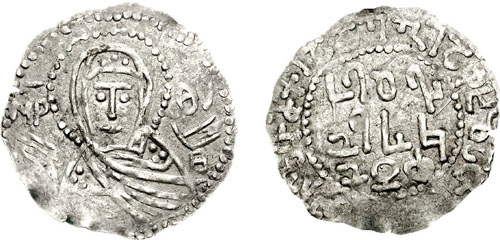
Coin of George II which reads: "God preserve Giorgi, King of the Abkhazians and K'artl'i, Caesar"

In 994, Gurgen of Iberia adopted the title mepet mepe ("King of Kings") and was granted "magistros" by the Byzantines, his son meanwhile Bagrat III of Georgia who united Georgia in 1008 only became a "kouropalates". In 1010, Catholicos Melchizedek I assumed the title "Catholicos-Patriarch of All Georgia". The Georgian kings were inspired by the Persian King of Kings (Shahanshah) and were as such the king over the Near East and Caucasia and equal to the emperor. The Byzantine Empire saw Georgia as a vassal even though it was superficial. George II of Georgia also adopted the title caesar which he minted on coins which were based on Byzantine coins. His son David IV declared himself "King of Kings of the Abkhazians, Iberians, Armenians, Arranians, Kakhetians, sword of the Messiah, Emperor/Basileus of all the East". He denounced the titles granted by the Byzantine emperors and declared himself autocrat but the Byzantines did not use the title basileus for him. Throughout the 11th century up to the early 13th century, Georgian kings claimed to be the "ruler of the whole East and West" challenging the authority of Byzantium over the Eastern Christian world. David IV and Tamar would link themselves to Constantine the Great. After the Fourth Crusade, Georgia presented itself as the Orthodox Church and Queen Tamar of Georgia invaded Chaldia and installed her relatives of the deposed Komnenos dynasty as emperors of the Empire of Trebizond which remained a close ally of Georgia to the very end but there had also been Georgian invasions into Lazica. In the 1220s, Georgia lists "Greece" as their vassals which may refer to Trebizond. Despite their disputes, the ties between Georgia and Constantinople remained and Georgia saw themselves as their ally against the Muslims which surrounded the kingdom. In 1651, king Alexander III of Imereti swore allegiance to tsar Alexis of Russia calling himself tsar and Alexis Tsar and Grand Prince […] of all Russia, autocrat in all his sovereign will. In the Treaty of Georgievsk (1783), which turned the Georgian Kingdom of Kartli-Kakheti into a Russian protectorate, Catherine the Great is referred to as Her Imperial Majesty and King Heraclius II as His Serene Highness Tsar.

=== Byzantine rump states ===
Expansion of the Despotate of Epirus and Empire of Thessalonica until 1230

Following the Fourth Crusade in 1204, there had also been multiple Byzantine pretenders including Alexios Aspietes but none of these rump states were able to gain the military strength of other major powers of that time. The loss of Constantinople was seen as the main problem rather than the existence of multiple emperors. The different pretenders would present their descent from older ruling dynasties for example Michael VIII Palaiologos wielded the quadruple surname Komnenos Angelos Doukas Palaiologos. Eventually, the Empire of Nicaea rose to become the dominant rump state. The new Latin Emperors recognize these pretenders and claimed the sole leadership over the Eastern Empire. Pope Gregory X denied his imperial title only calling John III a nobili viro ("noble man"). Frederick II was the only Western sovereign monarch to recognize John III's imperial title. Though, even he addressed John III only as imperatorem Graecorum illustri ("Illustrious Emperor of the Greeks") rejecting his Roman claim while insisting to be the Roman Emperor himself but Frederick II did recognize his people as "Roman".

In 1225 or 1227, the Despot of Epirus Theodore Komnenos Doukas was crowned by Archbishop of Ohrid Demetrios Chomatenos. This state was given the name Empire of Thessalonica by historians. Demetrios claimed that the Patriarchate of Constantinople ceased to exist with the death of John X in 1206 and argued that the Archbishopric of Ohrid (or Justiniana Prima) ranked higher than Nicaea only seeing the Patriarch residing in Nicaea Germanus II as a regular bishop. This resulted to a schism between Nicaea and Thessalonica. The Emperor of Nicaea John III Doukas Vatatzes was willing to name Theodore Komnenos Doukas co-emperor if he recognized his supremacy, which Theodore refused. Fearing an attack by Theodore, the Latin Empire and the Nicene Empire reached a temporary truce. Theodore's attempt to capture Constantinople failed at the Battle of Klokotnitsa against the Bulgarian Empire where he was captured. Bulgarian Tsar Ivan Asen II still recognized Theodore as a tsar/emperor in an inscription in the Holy Forty Martyrs Church about the battle. Theodore's son Manuel Doukas became his successor but he became de facto a vassal of Ivan Asen II. Manuel reaffirmed the supremacy of the patriarch in Nicaea. John III attacked Thessalonica in 1242 but he had to end the attack following the Mongol advance. Emperor of Thessalonica John Komnenos Doukas still had to give up his imperial title and change it to despot.

Additionally, the Empire of Trebizond was formed in 1204 by Alexios I and David with support from Tamar of Georgia. They were members of the Komnenos dynasty which was deposed in 1185. Trebizond was more remote than Nicaea and was constantly threatened by the Sultanate of Rum. Trebizond soon came into conflict with Nicene emperor Theodore I Laskaris, after this David submitted to the Latin Empire. Thus, they abandoned their plans on conquering Constantinople. William Miller speculated that "nominal Latin suzerainty" was preferential to annexation by the Nicaeans. Niketas Choniates called the Trapezuntine emperors in his Panegyric of Theodore I Laskaris "lads of the Pontus". Different Palaiologan chronicles described them as rulers, princes or tyrants. Antony Eastmond states that "in Palaiologan historiography, Trebizond was neither an empire nor even a Greek state at all." The Emperors of Trebizond continued to use the imperial title even after the restoration of the Byzantine Empire by the Nicene emperors in 1261. In 1282, Byzantine Emperor Michael VIII proposed John II of Trebizond to use the title despot instead and cease using the imperial insignia in return for a marriage with his daughter Eudokia Palaiologina. John II did not adopt the title though but changed his title from pistos basileus kai autokrator ton Romaíon ("Faithful Basileus and Autocrat of the Romans") to en Christoi to theo pistos basil kai autokrator pásis Anatolís, Ivíron kai Perateías ("Faithful to Lord Christ Basileus and Autocrat of all the East, Iberia and Perateia") referring to the territory of his realm and removing direct mentions of the Romans. In 1461, the Empire of Trebizond ended.

== Early modern period ==
=== Holy Roman–Ottoman dispute ===
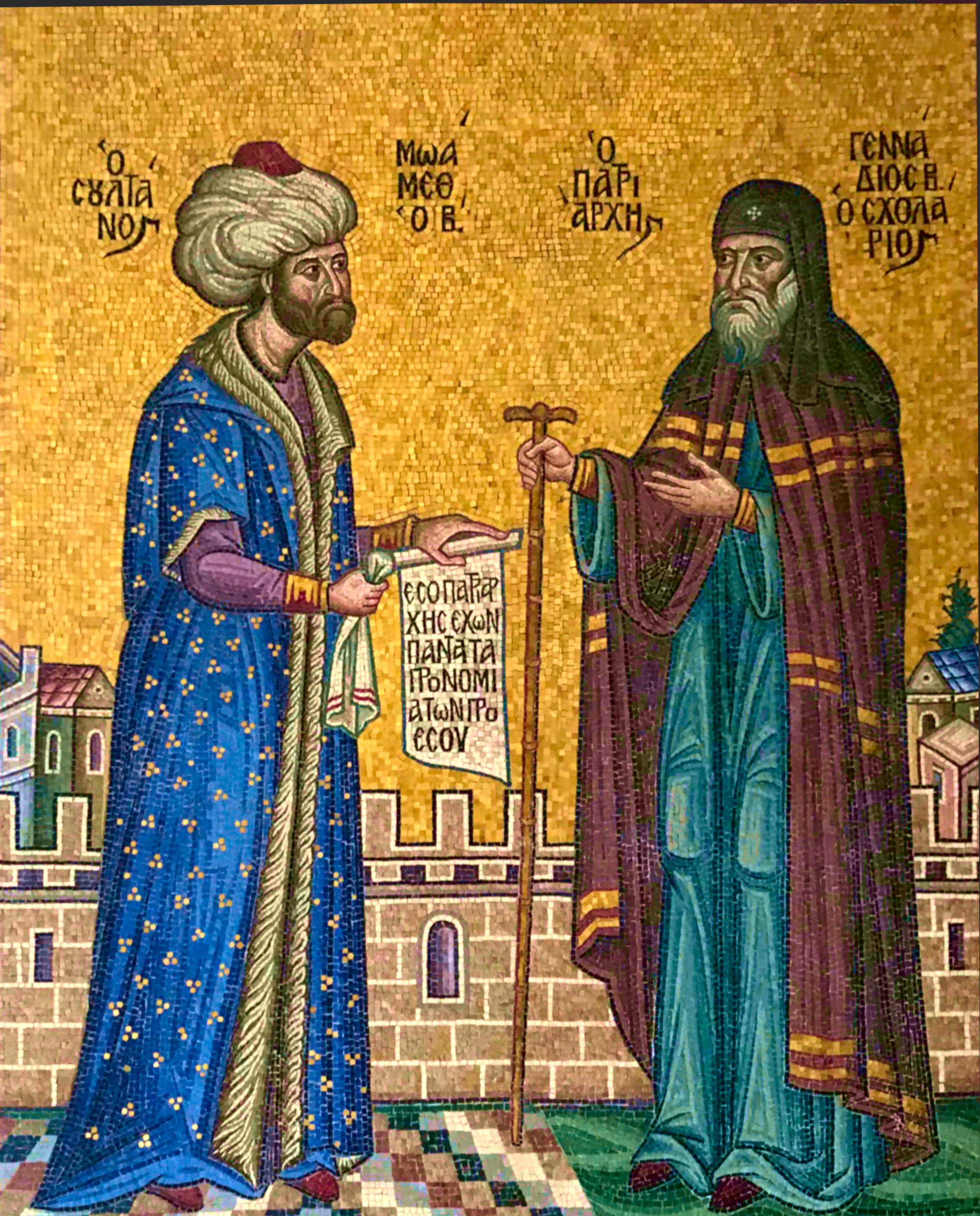
Sultan Mehmed II (left, depicted with Patriarch Gennadios to his right) claimed the legacy of the Byzantine Empire upon his conquest of Constantinople in 1453. Mehmed and succeeding Ottoman sultans would continue to refuse to recognize the rulers of the Holy Roman Empire as emperors until 1606.

With the fall of Constantinople in 1453 and the rise of the Ottoman Empire in the Byzantine Empire's stead, the problem of two emperors returned. Mehmed II, who had conquered the city, explicitly titled himself as the Kayser-i Rûm (Caesar of the Roman Empire), postulating a claim to world domination through the use of the Roman title. Mehmed deliberately linked himself to the Byzantine imperial tradition, making few changes in Constantinople itself and working on restoring the city through repairs and (sometimes forced) immigration, which soon led to an economic upswing. Mehmed also appointed a new Greek Orthodox patriarch, Gennadios, and began minting his own coins (a practice which the Byzantine emperors had engaged in, but the Ottomans never had previously). Furthermore, Mehmed introduced stricter court ceremonies and protocols inspired by those of the Byzantines. The sultans controlled the leadership of the Orthodox church and ensured its hostility towards the Catholic church. Under Bayezid II, a council was held which lasted until 1484 which condemned "the terrible and foreign doctrines of the Latins" and broke with any agreements of the Council of Florence.

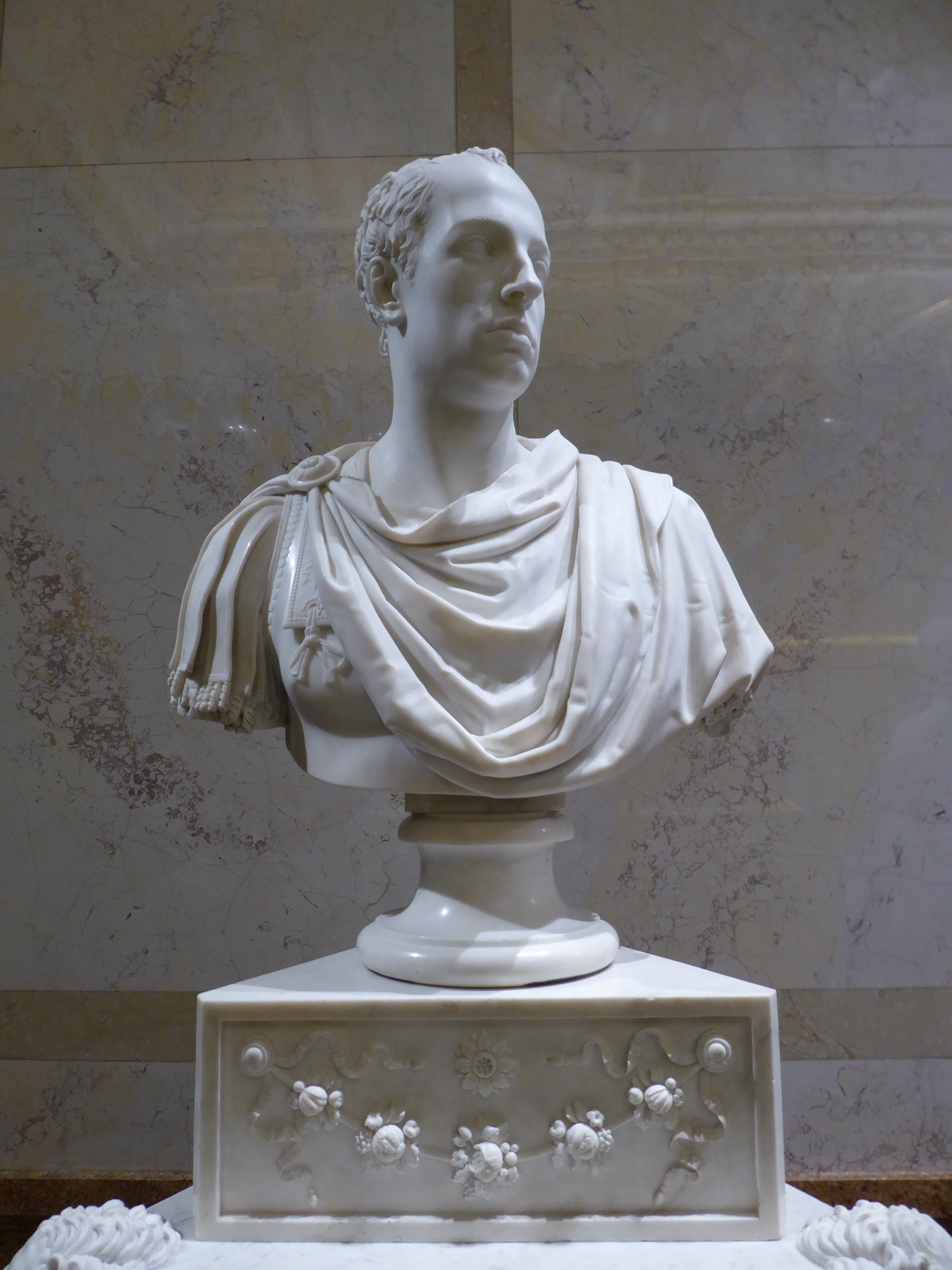
Marble bust of the final Holy Roman emperor, Francis II, in a style inspired by ancient Roman marble busts

The Holy Roman idea that the empire located primarily in Germany constituted the only legitimate empire eventually gave rise to the association with Germany and the imperial title, rather than associating it with the ancient Romans. The earliest mention of "the Holy Roman Empire of the German Nation" (a phrase rarely used officially) is from the 15th century and its later increasingly used shorthand, imperium Romano-Germanicum, demonstrates that contemporaries of the empire increasingly saw the empire and its emperors not as successors of a Roman Empire that had existed since Antiquity but instead as a new entity that appeared in medieval Germany whose rulers were referred to as "emperors" for political and historical reasons. In the 16th century up to modern times, the term "emperor" was thus also increasingly applied to rulers of other countries. In the Holy Roman Empire türkischer Kaiser ("Turkish Emperor") became common while in Italy and the Papal States Turcus ("Turk"), Magnus Turcus ("Great Turk") or Turcorum Tyrannus ("Turkish Tyrant") were more prominent and avoided the term emperor at the start. Pope Pius II was willing to recognize Mehmed as emperor if he converted to Catholicism. Johannes Cuspinian, who served under Maximilian I lists Ottoman sultans alongside Holy Roman and Byzantine emperors from the Antiquity in his book Caesares. In 1496 and 1497, Maximilian I met an Ottoman delegation in Vigevano and in Stift Stams. During the meetings, Maximilian I accepted the Imperial title used for the sultan and called him Turc-emperor privately. Maximilian I even hosted an imposter pretender Calixtus Ottomanus who was called "Turkish emperor" by both Maximilian I and himself. Emperor Charles VI considered using his potential claim to the Byzantine throne through Andreas Palaiologos's last will against the Ottomans but the expected success by Prince Eugene of Savoy did not came to fruition. The Holy Roman emperors themselves maintained that they were the successors of the ancient Roman emperors up until the abdication of Francis II, the final Holy Roman emperor, in 1806.

Contemporaries within the Ottoman Empire recognized Mehmed's assumption of the imperial title and his claim to world domination. The historian Michael Critobulus described the sultan as "emperor of emperors", "autocrat" and "Lord of the Earth and the sea according to God's will". In a letter to the doge of Venice, Mehmed was described by his courtiers as the "emperor". Other titles were sometimes used as well, such as "grand duke" and "prince of the Turkish Romans". The citizens of Constantinople and the former Byzantine Empire (which still identified as "Romans" and not "Greeks" until modern times) saw the Ottoman Empire as still representing their empire, the universal empire; the imperial capital was still Constantinople and its ruler, Mehmed II, was the basileus. As with the Byzantine emperors before them, the imperial status of the Ottoman sultans was primarily expressed through the refusal to recognize the Holy Roman emperors as equal rulers. In diplomacy, the western emperors were titled as kıral (kings) of Vienna or Hungary.

The problem of two emperors and the dispute between the Holy Roman Empire and the Ottoman Empire would be finally resolved after the two empires signed a peace treaty following a string of Ottoman defeats. In the 1606 Peace of Zsitvatorok Ottoman sultan Ahmed I, for the first time in his empire's history, formally recognized the Holy Roman Emperor Rudolf II with the title császár (Hungarian for Caesar) rather than kıral. For a last payment of 200,000 Gulden, the Sublime Porte's annual tribute demands were stopped. Ahmed made sure to write "like a father to a son", symbolically emphasizing that the eastern empire retained some primacy over its western counterpart. The Ottoman Empire later shifted towards imperator or imperador which fell out of use by the Ottoman sultans at this point and was not associated with him anymore. In the Ottoman Empire itself, the idea that the sultan was a universal ruler lingered on despite his recognition of the Holy Roman emperor as an equal. Writing in 1798, the Greek Orthodox patriarch of Jerusalem, Anthemus, saw the Ottoman Empire as imposed by God himself as the supreme empire on Earth and something which had arisen due to the dealings of the Palaiologan emperors with the western Christians:

Behold how our merciful and omniscient Lord has managed to preserve the integrity of our holy Orthodox faith and to save (us) all; he brought forth out of nothing the powerful Empire of the Ottomans, which he set up in the place of our Empire of the Romaioi, which had begun in some ways to deviate from the path of the Orthodox faith; and he raised this Empire of the Ottomans above every other in order to prove beyond doubt that it came into being by the will of God .... For there is no authority except that deriving from God.

Ottoman administrative documents continued to call the Roman-German emperors "Kings of Vienna" up to the early 18th century. Nevertheless it was an important step to equality in foreign politics. The treaty was reaffirmed multiple times for example by the Treaty of Karlowitz in 1699. European nations adopted a secular foreign policy and in 1771, Austria formed an alliance with the Ottomans against Kingdom of Prussia. After the unsuccessful Austrian invasion, the Ottomans accepted Western diplomatic practices with the Treaty of Sistova of 1791. The Austrian Empire continued to respect the compromise with the Ottomans after the dissolution of the Holy Roman Empire.

=== Holy Roman–Russian dispute ===
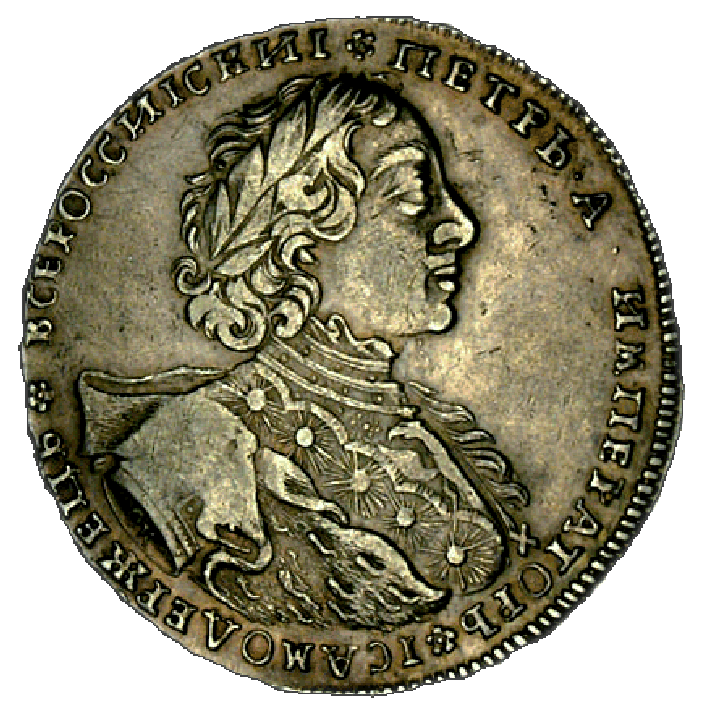
Coin of Russian Emperor (Tsar) Peter I, with the emperor being depicted with a laurel wreath, as ancient Roman emperors were on their coins

By the time of the first embassy from the Holy Roman Empire to Russia in 1488, "the two-emperor problem had [already] translated to Moscow." In 1472, Ivan III, the grand prince of Moscow, married the niece of the last Byzantine emperor, Zoe Palaiologina, and informally declared himself tsar (emperor) of all the Russian principalities. In 1480, he stopped paying tribute to the Golden Horde and adopted the imperial double-headed eagle as one of his symbols. A distinct Russian theory of translatio imperii was developed by Abbot Philotheus of Pskov. In this doctrine, the first Rome fell to heresy (Catholicism) and the second Rome (Constantinople) to the infidel (Ottomans), but the third Rome (Moscow) would endure until the end of the world.

In 1488, Ivan III demanded recognition of his title as the equivalent of emperor, but his demand was refused by the Holy Roman emperor Frederick III and other western European rulers. Ivan IV went even further in his imperial claims, claiming descent from the first Roman emperor, Augustus. At his coronation as the tsar of all Russia in 1547, he used the Slavic translation of the Byzantine coronation service and what he claimed was Byzantine regalia. Around this time, Ivan IV stopped using the term "brother" towards other kings and only saw the Holy Roman Emperor and the Ottoman Sultan as his equals. England, Denmark and initially Sweden were the first to recognize Ivan IV as tsar. The Treaty of Cardis of 1661 obliged Sweden to use the title Tsar after Sweden stopped recognising the title again. King Louis XIII of France recognized Michael of Russia as the "Head of the Eastern Hemisphere" and Empereur in 1629. The Papacy itself was willing to recognize the Russian tsar as imperator if Russia agreed to communion with the Catholic church, and also avoided calling him "Grand Prince", instead opting for Domino Russiae (Lord of Russia). Pope Clement VIII recognised Feodor I of Russia as a tsar in the header of a 1594 letter, but in the main text, the Pope reverts to addressing Feodor as "Lord of Russia and Grand Duke of Moscow," which papal documents continued to use until 1673. In 1673, Paul Menesius advised Pope Clement X to refer to the Russian sovereign as a tsar as he argued that it is the Russian word for "ruler" similar to other regional titles like "caliph" or "sharīf," rather than meaning "Caesar".

According to Marshall Poe, the "Third Rome" theory first spread among clerics, and for much of its early history, Russia still regarded Moscow as subordinate to Constantinople (Tsargrad), a position also held by Ivan IV. Poe argues that Philotheus' doctrine of Third Rome may have been mostly forgotten in Russia, relegated to the Old Believers, until shortly before the development of pan-Slavism. Hence the idea could not have directly influenced the foreign policies of Peter and Catherine, though those tsars did compare themselves to the Romans. An expansionist version of Third Rome reappeared primarily after the coronation of Alexander II in 1855, a lens through which later Russian writers would re-interpret Early Modern Russia, arguably anachronistically.

Green: primarily Eastern Orthodox regions in Poland-Lithuania (1573)

The problem of the two emperors also featured in Polish-Russian disputes. The Muscovite grand princes added "of all Russia" to their title, marking the goal of "gathering the Russian lands" under their rule, including those under Lithuanian control, and the Polish–Lithuanian union became an obstacle for agreements with Russia. The dispute also existed alongside religious competition between the Poland-Lithuania and Russia: shortly after the Moscow Patriarchate of the Orthodox Church was established, bishops in Poland-Lithuania formed the 1595 Union of Brest to limit Russian influence. Following the transfer of the metropolis of Kiev to the Russian church in 1685, Polish authorities also pressured Orthodox bishops to join the Ruthenian Uniate Church. In 1549, Russia and Poland–Lithuania agreed to use "Grand Prince" in the Polish text and "Tsar" in the Russian text for a peace treaty. During the negotiations of the Truce of Yam-Zapolsky (1582), Jesuit Antonio Possevino, who served as mediator, rejected the titles tsar or emperor, as he believed that they could only be granted by the pope and that the "single Emperor of the Christians" had been transferred to the West when the Byzantine emperor became "less loyal." The Russian delegation replied with the claim that the Grand Prince Vladimir the Great was granted the title by Roman emperors Arcadius and Honorius, which Possevino dismissed. Possevino also rejected Moscow's second offer to use the title "Tsar of Kazan and Astrakhan" assuming that the Polish king would not accept a "Turkish or Tatar" title like "Tsar of the Tatars" to be used by a Christian ruler, apparently being unaware of the origin of tsar. Only in the Russian version of the treaty was the Tsar referred to as such. In 1610, Polish prince Władysław was elected Tsar and claimed the title even after he was elected King of Poland until 1634. In the Treaty of Perpetual Peace of 1686, Russia was officially recognized as a tsardom by Poland. Poland only recognized the title imperator in 1764.

The emperors of the Holy Roman Empire at first only recognized the Russian ruler as Zar von Kazan und Astrachan ("Tsar of Kazan and Astrakhan"). In 1576, after repeated Russian complaints, Maximilian II addressed Ivan IV as tsar in a letter. In 1617, Matthias recognized Michael of Russia de jure as tsar. In the Peace of Westphalia (1648), the Russian Tsar was referred to as Magnus dux Moscoviae (Grand Duke of Moscow) against their wishes. Nevertheless, this meant Russia was accepted as part of the res publica Christiana. The Holy Roman emperors still refused to address the Tsar with the style of "majesty", a right which the Holy Roman Empire had already granted to other monarchs, to which the Russian delegation replied in 1661 by styling Emperor Leopold I as Kayserliche grossmächigkeit (or korolevskoe Velikomocnyj) instead. Prior to the embassy of Peter the Great in 1697–1698, Russia's Tsarist government still had a poor understanding of the Holy Roman Empire and its constitution. Under Peter, use of the double-headed eagle increased and other less Byzantine symbols of the Roman past were adopted, such as portrayals of the Tsar as an ancient Roman emperor on coins minted after the Battle of Poltava in 1709. The Great Northern War brought Russia into alliance with several north German princes and Russian troops fought in northern Germany. In 1718, Peter further published a letter sent to Tsar Vasily III by the Holy Roman emperor Maximilian I dated 4 August 1514 in which the emperor addressed the Russian as Kaiser (spelled Kayser) and implicitly his equal. In October 1721, Peter assumed the title imperator to preclude the possibility of translating his title as king (rex). The Holy Roman emperors refused to recognise this new title; it was pointed out that the letter from Maximilian was the only example of using the "Kaiser" title for Russian monarchs. Peter's proposal that the Russian and German monarchs alternate as premier rulers in Europe was also rejected. The Emperor Charles VI, supported by France, insisted that there could only be one emperor. Despite the alliance between Charles VI and Catherine I of Russia which was formally concluded in 1726, it was specifically stipulated that Russian monarch was not to use the imperial title in correspondence with the Holy Roman Emperor, and the alliance treaty omits any references thereto, with Charles VI being referred as Suae Sacrae Caesareae et Regiae Catholicae Majestatis ("His Sacred Caesarian and Royal Catholic Majesty") and Catherine I as Suae Sacrae Totius Russiae Majestatis ("Her Sacred Majesty of All Russia"), officially recognizing her at least as majesty.

The reason for gradual acceptance of the Russian claims was the War of the Austrian Succession, where both sides attempted to draw Russia towards them. In 1742, the Vienna court of Maria Theresa formally recognized the Russian imperial title, though without admitting the Russian ruler's parity. Her rival, the Emperor Charles VII, upon his coronation in 1742 initially refused to acknowledge Russian pretensions. However, by the end of 1743, the course of the war and the influence of Prussian allies (which had recognized Russian imperial title almost immediately in 1721) convinced him that some form of recognition had to be offered. This was done in early 1744; however, in this case Charles VII only acted in his capacity as a Bavarian elector and not as a Holy Roman Emperor. By the time of his death, the issue still had not been formally settled at the imperial level. It was only in 1745 that the Imperial electoral college acknowledged Russian claims, which were then confirmed in the document produced by the newly-elected emperor Francis I (Maria Theresa's husband) and formally ratified by the Reichstag in 1746. France was the last major Western kingdom to recognise the title a year earlier.

Three times between 1733 and 1762, Russian troops fought alongside Austrians within boundaries of the empire. The ruler of Russia from 1762 until 1796, Catherine the Great, was a German princess. In 1779, she helped broker the Peace of Teschen that ended the War of the Bavarian Succession. Thereafter, Russia claimed to be a guarantor of the imperial constitution as per the Peace of Westphalia (1648) with the same standing as France and Sweden. In 1780, Catherine II called for an invasion of the Ottoman Empire and the creation of a new Greek Empire or restored Eastern Roman Empire, for which purposes an alliance was made between Joseph II's Holy Roman Empire and Catherine II's Russian Empire, with her grandson Konstantin Pavlovich as a new emperor in his own right. The alliance between Joseph and Catherine was, at the time, heralded as a great success for both parties. Neither the Greek Plan or the Austro-Russian alliance would persist long. Nonetheless, both empires would be part of the anti-Napoleonic Coalitions as well as the Concert of Europe. Any possible Holy Roman–Russian dispute ended with the dissolution of the Holy Roman Empire in 1806.

=== Ottoman–Russian dispute ===
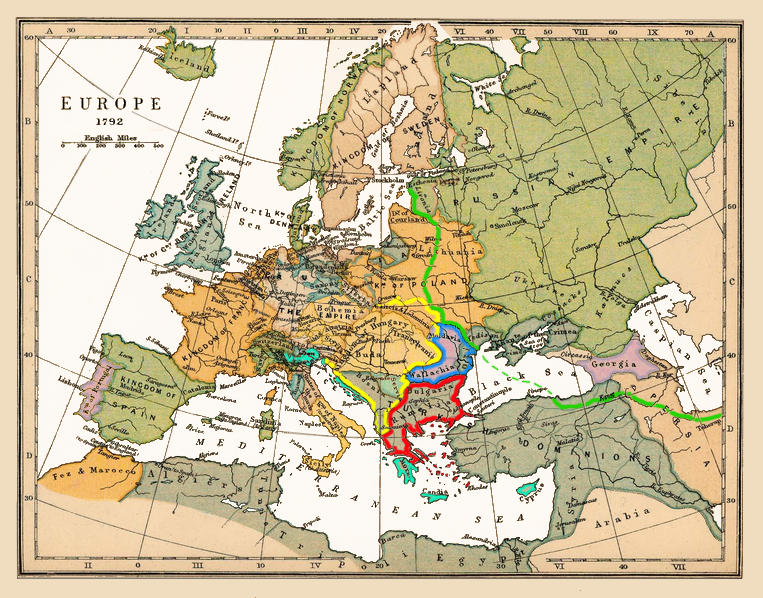
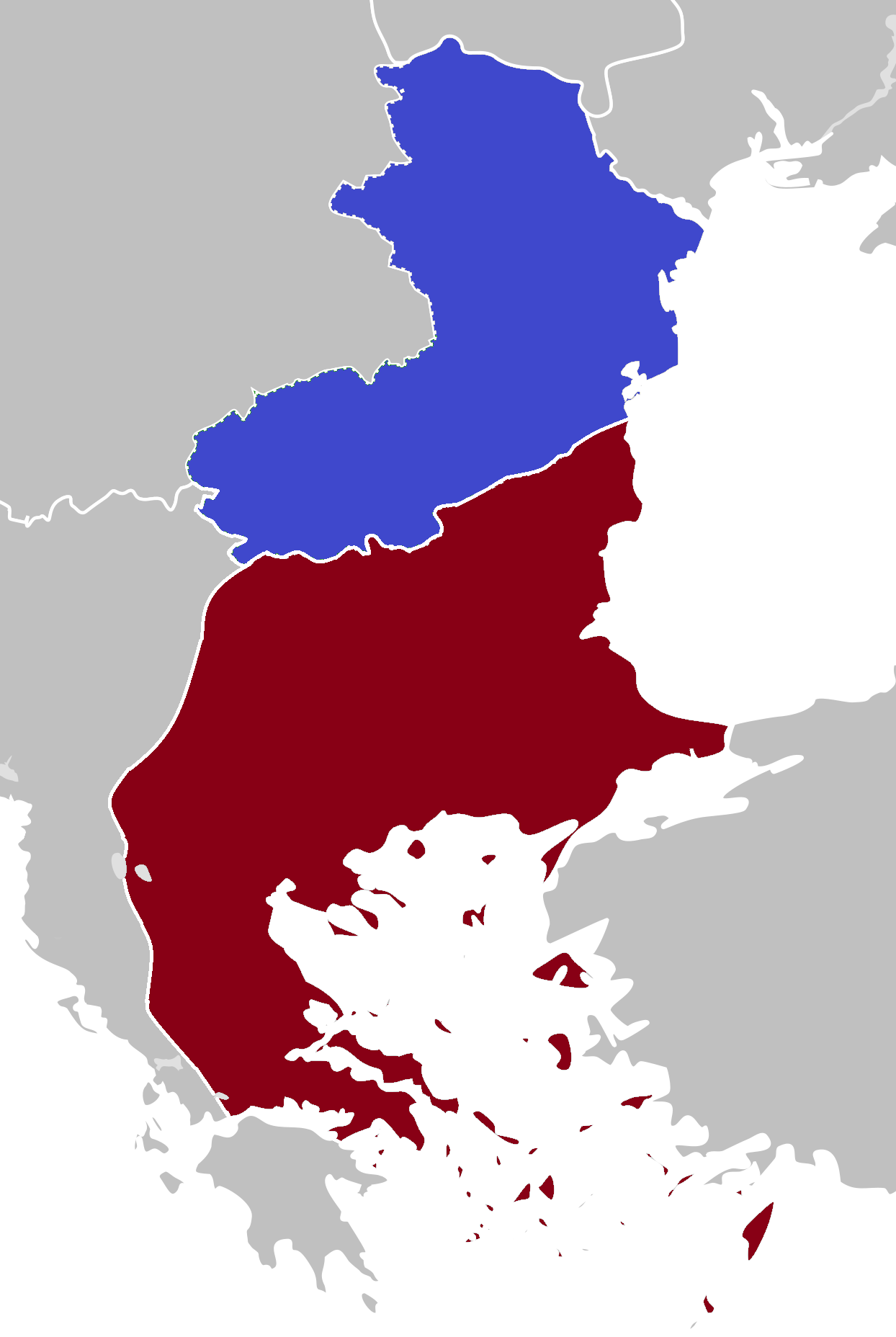
Left: Catherine the Great's "Greek Plan". Red marks the planned borders of the restored Byzantine Empire under her grandson Konstantin Pavlovich, blue marks the planned borders of the "Kingdom of Dacia" under Grigory Potemkin. The compensations for the Habsburg monarchy are marked with yellow and the compensations for Venice are marked with blue-green.
Right: Close-up of the intended approximate borders of the restored Byzantine Empire (red) and the Kingdom of Dacia (blue).

Both the Tsardom of Russia (and later Russian Empire) and the Ottoman Empire claimed the succession of the Byzantine Empire specifically. The Pope married off Sophia Palaiologina to Grand Prince Ivan III in hope of starting a joint crusade to reclaim Constantinople but Ivan III had no plans for a war with the Ottomans. In 1547, Ivan IV crowned himself tsar claiming both the political and religious succession of the Byzantine Empire as part of their own translatio imperii of the Third Rome. By the 1570s, Tsar Ivan IV stopped using the term "brother" towards other kings and only saw the Holy Roman Emperor and the Ottoman Sultan as equal.

The Russians began to distinguish between the Byzantine emperor, who was the tsar for the Orthodox church, and the khan of the Golden Horde, who was the tsar for the princes. Under the reign of Grand Prince Ivan III, Vassian Patrikeyev argued that Ivan III should wield the title tsar and not the khans and compared him to Vladimir the Great and Dmitry Donskoy. In 1480, Moscow gained independence from the Golden Horde with the Great Stand on the Ugra River, allowing the grand prince to adopt the title samoderzhets (in Greek autokrator) in 1492. When Ivan IV conquered the khanates of Kazan and Astrakhan, he assumed the titles "Tsar of Kazan and Astrakhan". He replaced their rulers not as a khan but as a ruler of an Orthodox tsardom, how V. V. Trepavlov described it. The Crimean khans saw themselves as the successors of the Khans of the Golden Horde thus inheriting Russia as their "vassal" and became the only intermediary between the Kremlin and the Sublime Porte. They had been Ottoman vassals themselves from 1475 and had been decisive in the non-violent victory in 1480. The Crimean Khanate claimed to be equal or even superior to the Tsardom of Russia which had to pay tribute to them (Ulug Khazīne lit. 'Great Treasure' which the Russian tsar called "present", pominki in Russian). In 1643, the khan had to officially apologize after an envoy called the "gift" a kharaj but the annual tribute remained an obligation. In 1661, the Crimean vizier reminded the Russian tsar that the Ottoman sultan would be suzerain ruler over both the khan and him. The Khanate was generally more willing to address other rulers by their official title unlike their overlords but in 1660, the Crimean vizier Sefer Ğazı refused to refer the Russian tsar as Magrib ve Maşriq padişahı ("Emperor/Padishah of the East and West") and potentially even compared him to the prince-electors of the Holy Roman Empire instead. Khan Mehmed IV Giray stated that "even the Ottoman Padişah is not using such titles for himself". The Crimean court rejected the Russian claim to be Ālem-penāh (Refuge of the World) too as it had been used by the Sultan. In 1670, following the Truce of Andrusovo, a Crimean envoy referred to the Russian tsar and the Polish king as "Great Padishahs" and in 1671, khan Adil Giray used the title "Emperor/Padishah of the East and West" for the Russian tsar. With the Treaty of Constantinople of 1700, the tribute payments were permanently stopped.

The Russian Church opposed the short-lived union between the Byzantine and Latin churches after the Council of Florence and argued that the fall of Constantinople (1453) was divine punishment for it. Moscow then began to saw themselves as the center of the Christian world as part of their "Third Rome" ideology. The Russian Church soon became de facto autocephalous, their metropolitans were not appointed by Constantinople anymore and acted politically independent. Gennadius Scholarius was appointed Patriarch of Constantinople by Sultan Mehmed II in accordance to Byzantine tradition. It is recorded that from at least 1474, the Economical Patriarchate referred to the sultan as basileus. In 1561, the Patriarch of Constantinople blessed Ivan IV's right to the title tsar. In 1589, the Moscow Patriarchate was accepted by Constantinople gaining official autocephaly from Constantinople.

Ivan III called the sultan a tsar. This changed with Vasili III of Russia but Selim I preferred the caliph title anyway. In 1525, the Ottoman court ceased to issue official documents in scripts other than Arabic, a further step towards Islamic political identity. Translations of official documents continued to be made and issued by lower officials and governors, and for diplomatic purposes, though these did not carry the tughra (the sultan's signature). This meant that titles such as basileus and imperator ceased to be used officially by the sultans themselves, who instead mostly used only sultan and/or padişah. The sultans continued to deny other monarchs the style of padişah in diplomatic correspondence, which meant that the implications of their imperial role was not forgotten. Ottoman sultans after Suleiman I at times still stressed that they were Roman emperors (Note: Ahmed I (r. 1603–1607) referred to himself as sahib-kıran-i memalik-i-Rûm ve 'Acem ve 'Arab ("the lord of the fortunate conjunction of the Roman, Persian and Arab kingdoms"). Mehmed IV (r. 1648–1687) used the style ferman-ferma-yi memalik-i-Rûm ve 'Arab ve 'Acem ("the one who issues orders to the Roman, Arab and Persian kingdoms").) and the style kayser or kayser-i Rûm remained in use as late as the eighteenth century. Greek-language translations of official Ottoman documents continued to style the sultans as basileus until 1876, when the official Greek translation of the Ottoman constitution (Kanun-i esasi) established that the terms sultan (σουλτάνος, soultanos) and padişah (παδισαχ, padisach) were to be used.

According to A. A. Novoselskyy, the Ottomans agreed to the title tsar in 1643 after the Siege of Azov but already Sultan Selim II addressed Tsar Ivan IV as Moskov kıralı sar ("Moscovian king tsar"). Halil İnalcık argues that sar or çar did not mean "Caesar" to the Ottomans. The Ottoman sultans usually referred to them as Moskov kıralı ("Moscovian king") or Moskov çarı ("Moscovian tsar"), the latter being used Treaty of Constantinople of 1700. The Ottoman Empire shifted from Muscovy to Russia when they recognized Elizabeth I as tamamen Rusiya imparatoriça ("Imperator of All of Russia") in 1741, by then imperator lost its association to the Ottoman sultans. From 1774, the Ottoman sultan had to officially recognize the Russian emperor as padişah according to article 13 of the Treaty of Küçük Kaynarca. Crimea was declared independent allowing Russia to annex their old rival in 1783. In return, their caliphate was verified as the Ottomans needed Islamic legitimization but it was purely spiritual. The Russian Empire later argued that the treaty gives them the rights to protect all Orthodox Christians within the Ottoman Empire. In 1780, Empress Catherine the Great called for the invasion of the Ottoman Empire and the creation of a new Greek Empire or restored Eastern Roman Empire rules by her grandson Konstantin Pavlovich as their own emperor, for which purposes an alliance was made between Joseph II's Holy Roman Empire and Catherine II's Russian Empire. Even during World War I, Russia had interests in conquering Constantinople and in 1915, the Entente agreed to give the city to the Russians in case of a victory as part of the Constantinople Agreement by then the idea of claiming "Tsargrad" blended into the wider Slavophile movement. The Russian Revolution and the collapse of the tsardom in 1917 ended the dream.

== Holy Roman–Leonese dispute ==
Some argued that the imperial title was adopted in order to affirm the independence of León from Charlemagne's restored Western Empire. Carl Erdmann associated the usage of the imperial title by the Kings of Castile to the decline of the power of Salian emperors. The title had also was used to show suzerainty over the Muslim and Christian petty kingdoms of Spain in the sense of a "King of Kings". Unlike Roman emperors, Castilian-Leonese rulers only claimed particular rule and did not distinguish between emperors and kings. The imperial claims fell out of use after reaching its peak under Alfonso VII.

Beginning in the 14th century, various chronicles record an 11th-century dispute over the imperial title between the Holy Roman Emperor and King Ferdinand I of León, who is known to have used the title 'emperor' (imperator) from at least 1056. The details of the dispute as recorded in the chronicles are clearly legendary. They include the king of France demanding tribute from León and El Cid declaring war on emperor, pope and French king. In the 16th century, the Jesuit historian Juan de Mariana gave a fuller and more plausible account of the supposed 11th-century dispute. At the Council of Florence in 1055, according to Mariana, the Emperor Henry III urged Pope Victor II to prohibit under severe penalties the use of the imperial title by Ferdinand. This story is generally regarded as apocryphal, although some modern authors have seen a kernel of historical truth in it. Antonio Ballesteros Beretta argued that Ferdinand adopted the title in opposition to Henry III's imperial pretensions. Edmund Ernst Stengel believed the version found in Mariana on the grounds that the latter probably used the now lost acts of the Council of Florence. Ernst Steindorff accepted it as an authentic transmission of the romancero tradition.

The 13th century Estoria de España claims that the imperial title of Alfonso VII was confirmed by the pope which is not backed up by contemporary documents which only call him rex. The Annales Cameracenses (1159) refer to "Our Emperor" (HRE), the "Emperor of Constantinople" (Byzantium) and the "Emperor of Galicia" (Castile–León) in contrast to the kings of Gaul (France) and England. In 1256, Alfonso X of Castile would list the Spanish emperors as his third imperial lineage alongside his "Roman" (HRE) and Constantinopolitan ancestry in his bid for the 1257 imperial election.

== Iconography ==
Double-headed eagle iconography across empires
Serbian eagle based on Angelino Dulcert's map (1339, during the reign of Stefan Dušan)

Banner of the Empire of Trebizond (1380s)

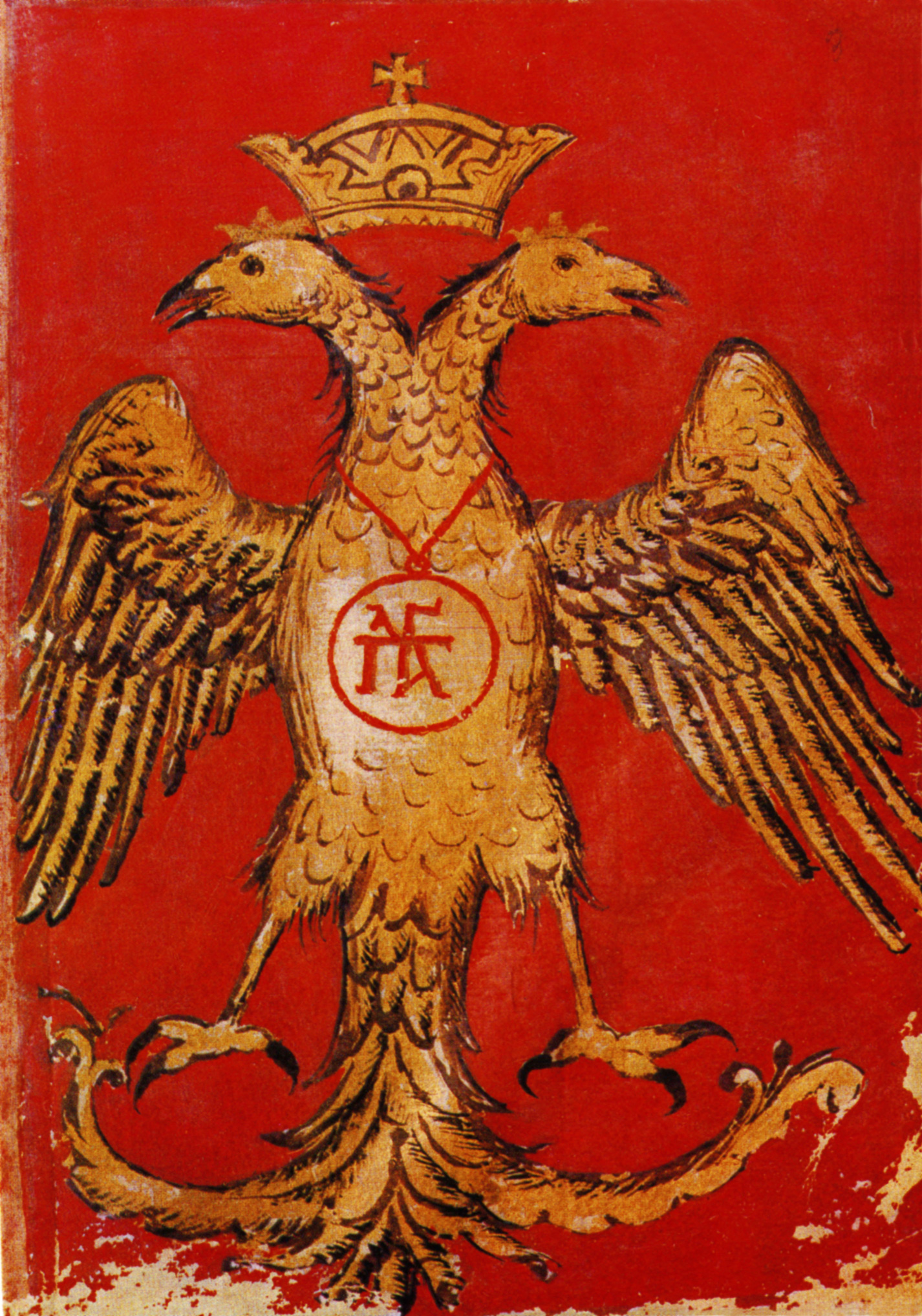
Late Byzantine coat of arms, House of Palaiologos (1400s)

Banner of the Holy Roman Empire, House of Habsburg (1400–1806)

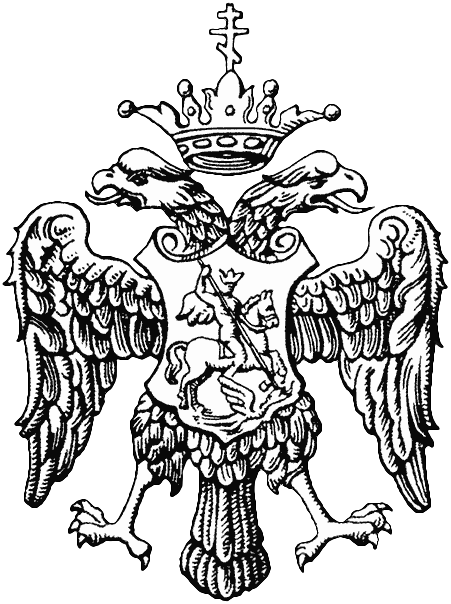
Coat of arms of Ivan the Terrible, House of Rurik (1577)

Coat of arms of the Russian Empire, House of Romanov (1882)

Coat of arms of the Austrian Empire, House of Habsburg (1815)

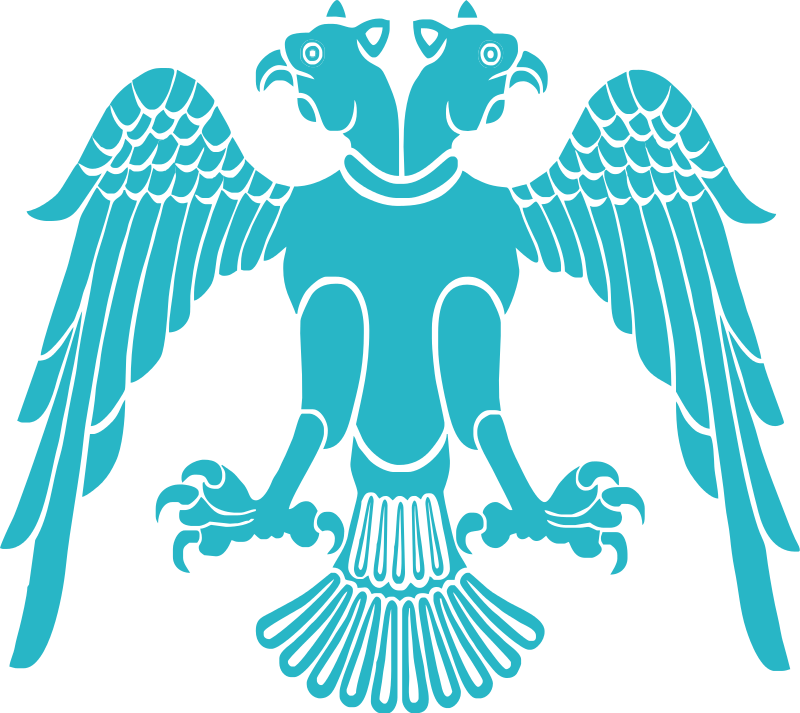
The double-headed eagle as used by the Great Seljuk Empire and the Seljuk Sultanate of Rome; used variously by the Ottoman Empire, Ayyubid dynasty, and Mamluk Sultanate

== Timeline of rival empires ==
- Byzantine & Latin Empires
- Holy Roman Empire
- Russia
- Ottoman Empire
- Bulgarian Empires
- Serbian Empires

== See also ==
- Legacy of the Roman Empire – for a general overview of the Roman Empire's legacy.
- Succession of the Roman Empire – for claims to being the successor of the Roman Empire.
- Succession to the Byzantine Empire – for claims to being the successor of the Byzantine Empire.
- Greek East and Latin West – for the division of the Mediterranean into distinct western and eastern linguistic and cultural spheres, dating to the time of the Roman Empire.
- East–West Schism – for the division between Roman and Constantinopolitan patriarchal sees of the Church.
- Emperor at home, king abroad – similar problem of the existence of multiple emperors claiming universal hegemony within Sinosphere.
- Caesaropapism – historiographical term for the extensive powers of the Byzantine Emperor in ecclesiastical affairs.
- Investiture Controversy – struggle between the Holy Roman Empire and Papacy for power over ecclesiastical appointments.
- Donation of Constantine – for the papacy's claim to Roman imperial powers over secular affairs and to primacy over the Byzantine See.
- Precedence among European monarchies – order of precedence during usual Papal ceremonies.
- European balance of power – a key factor in the foreign politics of the European great powers between the Thirty Years' War and World War I.
- King in Prussia – a title used by the Prussian kings to avoid competition with the King of the Romans (Holy Roman Emperor).
- Battle of Constantinople (1147)
- Consortium imperii – Sharing of Roman imperial authority by two or more emperors
