= Tarnovo Patriarchate =

Bulgarian orthodox church

Tаrnovo Patriarchate
- Търновска патриаршия
- Type: Eastern Orthodox; Eastern Catholic (1204–1235)
- Orientation: Eastern Christianity
- Theology: Eastern Orthodox theology
- Language: Old Church Slavonic (Old Bulgarian)
- Territory: Second Bulgarian Empire
- Independence: 1185
- Recognition: 1204 (by the Catholic Church); 1235 (by the Ecumenical Patriarchate)
- Branched from: Ecumenical Patriarchate of Constantinople
- Defunct: 1393

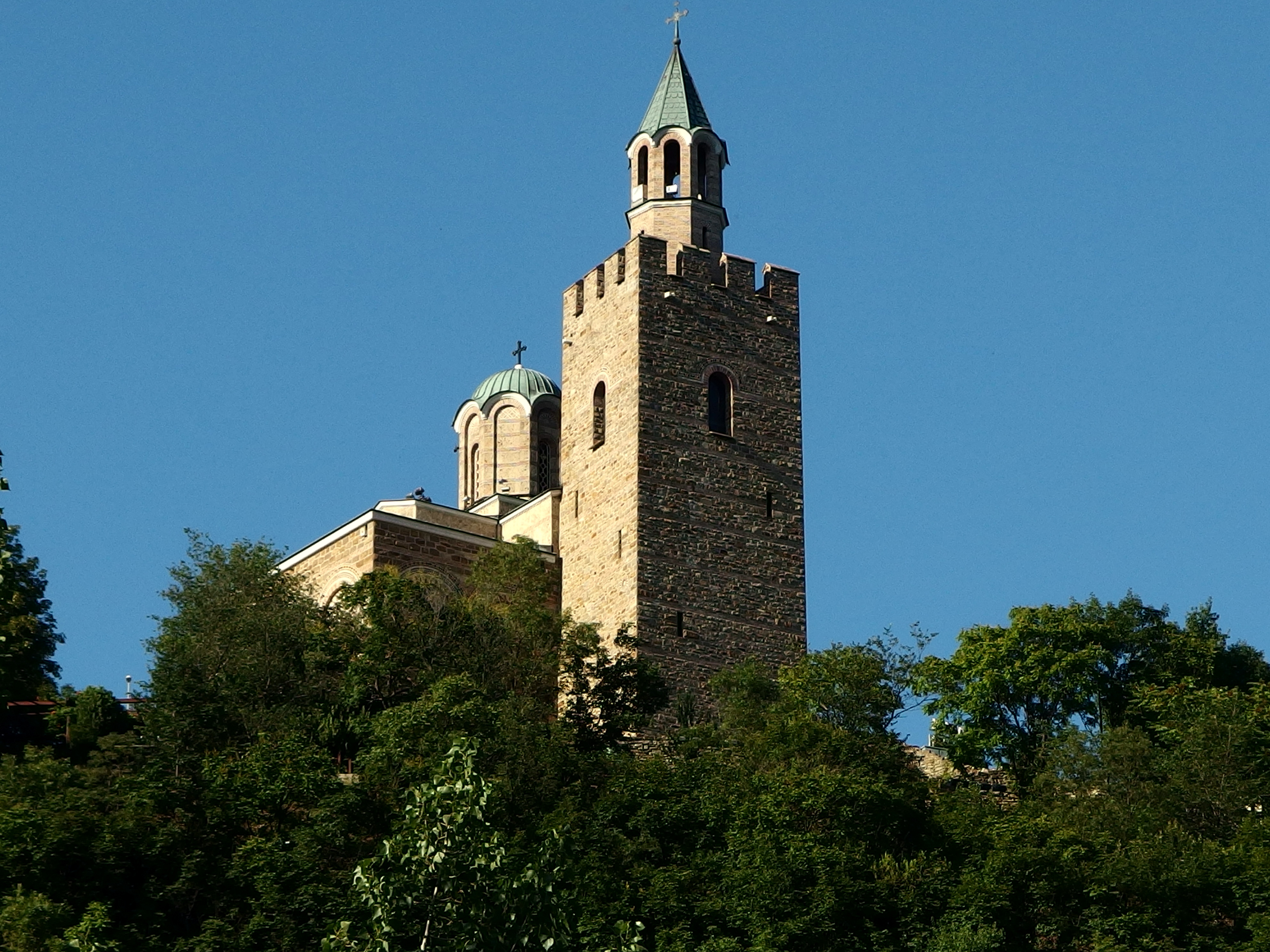
A view of the Patriarchal Cathedral of the Holy Ascension of God, the seat of the Tarnovo Patriarchate

The Tаrnovo Patriarchate (Bulgarian: Търновска патриаршия) was the name of an independent Bulgarian Orthodox Church in the period of 1235–1393.

== History ==
After the Bulgarian brothers Ivan Asen I and Peter IV reestablished the Bulgarian Empire in 1185 they took steps to restore the autocephalous Bulgarian church. As a result of the successful uprising of the brothers Peter IV and Ivan Asen I in 1185/1186, the foundations of the Second Bulgarian Empire were laid with Tarnovo as its capital. Following Boris I’s principle that the sovereignty of the state is inextricably linked to the autocephaly of the Church, the two brothers immediately took steps to restore the Bulgarian Patriarchate. As a start, they established an independent archbishopric in Tarnovo in 1186. The struggle to have the archbishopric recognized according to the canonical order and elevated to the rank of a Patriarchate took almost 50 years.

Since the recognition of an independent church by Patriarch of Constantinople was impossible, the Bulgarians temporarily concluded a Union with the Roman Catholic Church until 1235, when following the Church Council in Lampsak the Patriarchate of Tarnovo was recognized as an independent Patriarchate with its seat in the capital Tarnovo. The first Patriarch of Tаrnovo was Joachim I of Bulgaria. The last Patriarch to reside in Tarnovo was Euthymius of Tarnovo who was sent into exile by the Ottomans after they seized the Bulgarian capital in 1393.

In 1394, the Holy Synod of the Ecumenical Patriarchate gave the authorisation to the Metropolitan of Moldavia, Jeremiah, "to move with the help of God to the holy Church of Turnovo and to be allowed to perform everything befitting a prelate freely and without restraint." By around 1416, the territory of the Patriarchate of Turnovo was totally subordinated to the Ecumenical Patriarchate.

== Bulgarian Patriarchs of Tarnovo ==
Title	Primate	Reign	Seat
Bulgarian Patriarchs of Tarnovo (1235–1393)
Patriarch	Saint Joachim I	1235–1246	Tarnovo
Patriarch	Vissarion	c. 1246	Tarnovo
Patriarch	Basil II	1246–c. 1254	Tarnovo
Patriarch	Basil III	c. 1254–1263	Tarnovo
Patriarch	Joachim II	1263–1272	Tarnovo
Patriarch	Ignatius	1272–1277	Tarnovo
Patriarch	Saint Macarius	1277–1284	Tarnovo
Patriarch	Joachim III	1284–1300	Tarnovo
Patriarch	Dorotheus	1300–c. 1315	Tarnovo
Patriarch	Romanus	c. 1315–c. 1325	Tarnovo
Patriarch	Theodosius I	c. 1325–1337	Tarnovo
Patriarch	Joannicius I	1337–c. 1340	Tarnovo
Patriarch	Symeon	c. 1341–1348	Tarnovo
Patriarch	Theodosius II	1348–1363	Tarnovo
Patriarch	Joannicius II	1363–1375	Tarnovo
Patriarch	Saint Euthymius	1375–1393	Tarnovo
