= Patriarch Basil =

Patriarch Basil may refer to:

- Basil I of Constantinople, Ecumenical Patriarch in 970–974
- Basil II of Constantinople, Ecumenical Patriarch in 1183–1186
- Basil I of Bulgaria, Patriarch of Bulgaria c. 1186 – c. 1232
- Basil II of Bulgaria, Patriarch of Bulgaria c. 1246–1263
- Basil III of Bulgaria, Patriarch of Bulgaria c. 1254–1263
- Vasilije, Serbian Patriarch in 1763–1765
- Basil III of Constantinople, Ecumenical Patriarch in 1925–1929
