= Patriarch Basil of Bulgaria =

Patriarch Basil of Bulgaria may refer to:

- Basil I of Bulgaria, Patriarch of Bulgaria c. 1186 – c. 1232
- Basil II of Bulgaria, Patriarch of Bulgaria c. 1246–1263
- Basil III of Bulgaria, Patriarch of Bulgaria c. 1254–1263
