= Basil II (disambiguation) =

Basil II was the Byzantine emperor from 976 to 1025.

Basil II may also refer to:

- Basil II of Constantinople, patriarch from 1183 to 1186
- Basil II of Bulgaria, patriarch in the mid-13th century
- Vasily II of Moscow, grand prince from 1425 to 1462
