= Joachim II =

Joachim II may refer to:

- Joachim II Hector, Elector of Brandenburg (1505–1571)
- Patriarch Joachim II of Constantinople (R. from 1860 to 1863 and from 1873 to 1878)
- Joachim II of Bulgaria
