= Park-Monument of the Bulgarian-Soviet Friendship =

Memorial complex in Varna, Bulgaria

Coordinates: 43°13′09″N 27°56′56″E

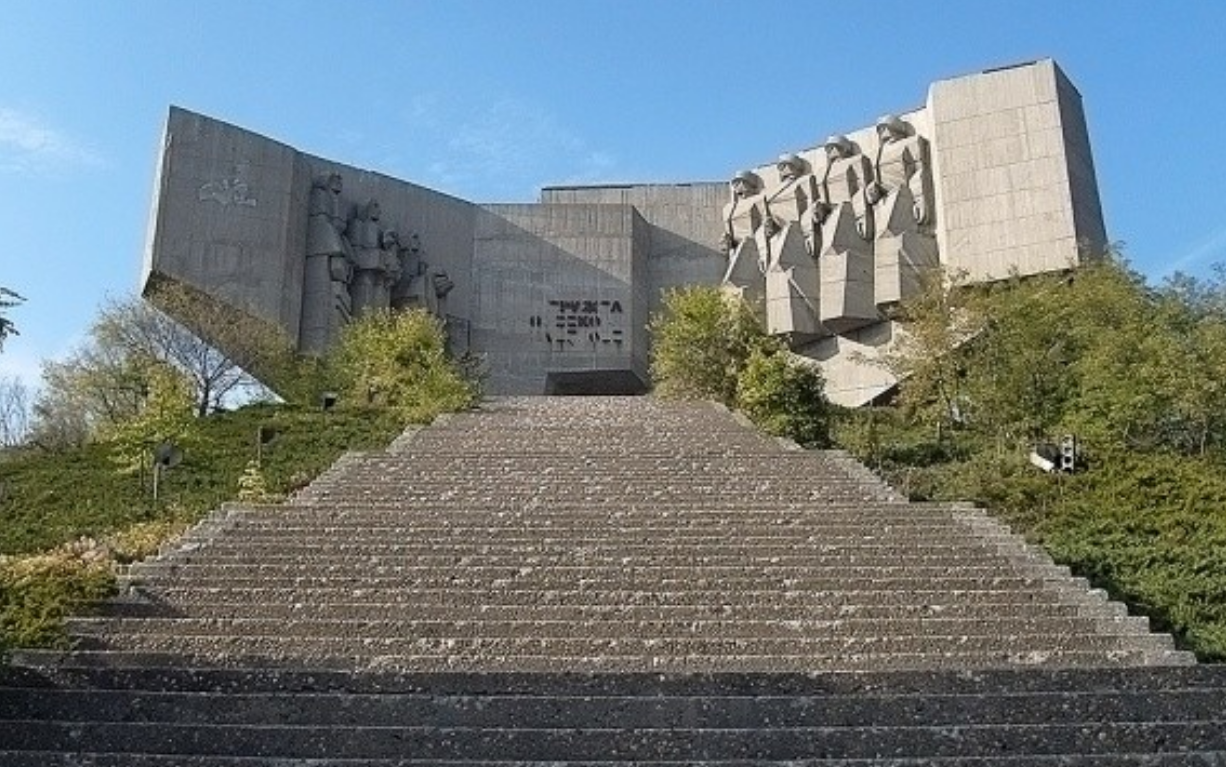
The Park-Monument of the Bulgarian-Soviet Friendship, Varna

Park-Monument of the Bulgarian-Soviet Friendship (Bulgarian: Парк-паметник на българо-съветската дружба), also known locally as the Russian Monument, is a large concrete memorial complex on Turna Tepe hill in the northern part of Varna, Bulgaria. Built between 1974 and 1978, it was conceived as a tribute both to the Russian troops who took part in the siege of Varna during the Russo-Turkish War of 1828–1829 and, more directly, to the Soviet Army and the political friendship between the Bulgarian and Soviet peoples that the ruling Bulgarian Communist Party promoted during the Cold War. At 23 metres high and 48 metres wide, it is the largest monument in the Varna region, and it remains one of the more prominent surviving examples of large-scale socialist-era memorial architecture in Bulgaria, alongside sites such as Buzludzha and the Founders of the Bulgarian State monument in Shumen.

Since the political changes of 1989, the monument has not been maintained by the state and has fallen into disrepair; its bronze inscriptions have largely been stripped by metal thieves and its interior spaces have been sealed off to visitors since around 2019. It is nonetheless still accessible from the outside and remains a fixture of the Varna skyline, visible from the sea and from much of the city's northern districts.

== Location ==
The monument stands atop Turna Tepe ("Crane Hill"), a hill roughly 110 metres above sea level in the Levski district in the northernmost part of Varna, about five kilometres from the city centre. The site can be reached on foot from the Sea Garden promenade or by local bus. Before the monument was built, the hill had served as a mass grave for partisans and others who died fighting against fascism in Bulgaria during the Second World War; their remains were transferred to Varna's Pantheon in 1958.

== History ==
=== Origins and planning ===
According to municipal and heritage records, the idea of building a memorial on Turna Tepe was first raised in 1958, the same year the remains of anti-fascist fighters were moved from the hill to the newly built Pantheon of Varna. A design competition was held in the autumn of 1973, and the winning proposal, submitted by architect Kamen Goranov together with sculptors Evgeni Barumov (also transliterated Barmov) and Alyosha Kafedzhiyski, was approved for construction. Ground was broken on 4 November 1974.

=== Construction ===
Work on the monument was carried out over roughly four years and, according to contemporary accounts, involved some 27,000 volunteer labourers organised through the Communist Party's youth and labour brigades, a common method of mobilising the workforce for major public projects in socialist Bulgaria. More than 10,000 tonnes of concrete and around 1,000 tonnes of reinforcing steel were used to build the structure and the roughly 400-square-metre platform on which it stands. The surrounding hillside was landscaped as a park, with tens of thousands of trees and shrubs planted, and a monumental staircase of 301 steps—known as the "Staircase of Victory"—was built leading from the base of the hill to the summit; including the connecting park alleys, the total number of steps on the site is said to exceed 2,400.

The completed park-monument was formally inaugurated on 13 November 1978, in a ceremony that reportedly included a tourist information point, a small bookshop and gift shop, and an eternal flame set into a bronze cube in front of the main structure.

== Design ==
The monument takes the form of two large, wing-like concrete forms that open outward from a central axis, an arrangement often described as evoking a bird in flight looking out toward the Black Sea and, symbolically, toward the Soviet Union beyond it. Each wing is populated by colossal reinforced-concrete figures: four soldiers, representing the Soviet Army, stand on the northern wing, while three female figures, representing Bulgaria and traditionally described as offering bread, salt and roses—symbols of hospitality and of the country's national flower—stand on the southern wing.

At the foot of the hill is a long memorial wall, about 22 metres high, which originally carried bronze plaques and inscriptions tracing the historical ties between the Bulgarian and Russian peoples from 1774 to 1994; an inscription above the entrance is said to have read "Friendship for centuries, throughout the centuries." Most of the bronze elements have since been removed or stolen for scrap. Below the hill, the site is also said to contain a Cold War-era bomb shelter and a network of concrete tunnels, though claims that these tunnels extend as far as the coast or other points in the city are unverified and are generally treated as local legend.

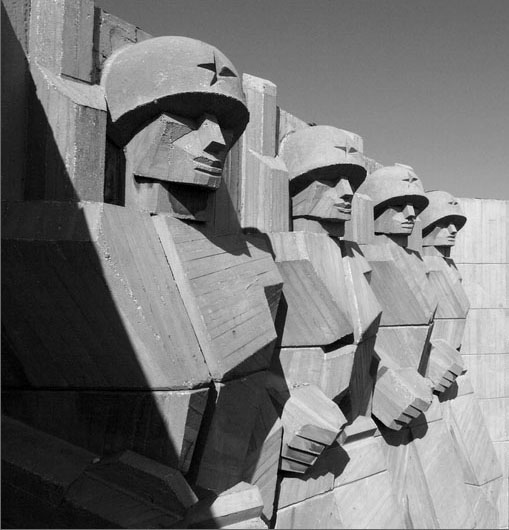
The monument in 2009

== Later history and current condition ==
After the fall of Bulgaria's communist government in 1989, the park-monument lost its official political function and, like many memorials associated with the socialist period, was left without a dedicated maintenance budget. Its bronze inscriptions and fittings were progressively looted, the eternal flame was extinguished, and the surrounding park became overgrown. Varna's municipal heritage register lists the site as a locally significant immovable cultural monument built in 1974, but records its technical condition as poor.

For a period the interior of the structure—reached through an opening between the two concrete wings—was accessible to visitors, and the site was popular with photographers of Brutalist and socialist-era architecture. Since around 2019 that opening has been sealed for safety reasons, and only the exterior of the monument and the surrounding staircase and park can currently be visited.

== See also ==
- Buzludzha monument
- Monument to 1300 Years of Bulgaria
- Socialist realism
- List of communist monuments
