= Shumen Plateau Nature Park =

Nature park in Shumen Heights, Bulgaria

- Bulgarian: Природен парк Шуменско плато
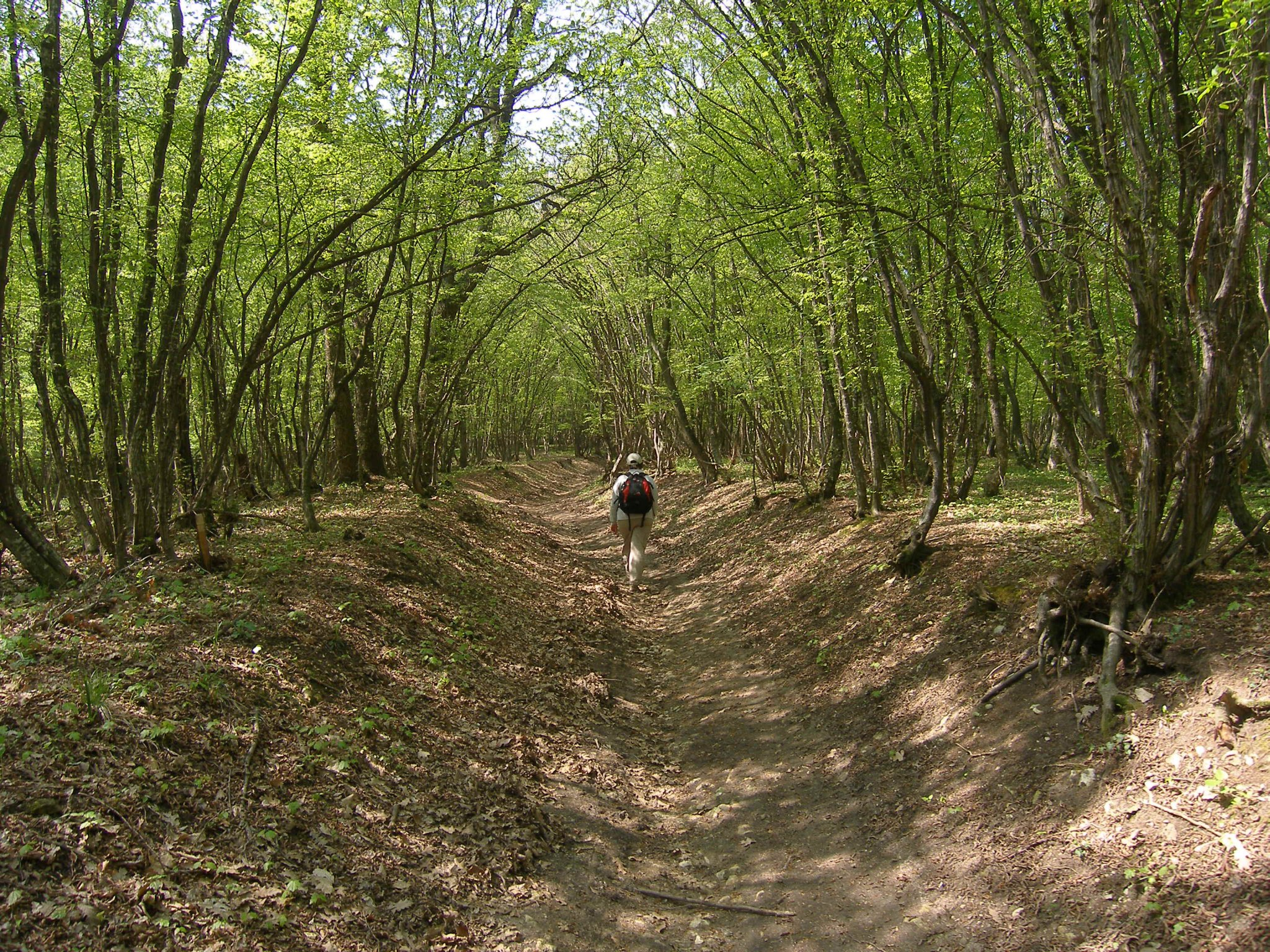
- Shumen Plateau forest near Shumen

- Location within Bulgaria
- Location: Shumen Heights, Shumen Province, Bulgaria
- Nearest city: Shumen
- Coordinates: 43°15′59″N 26°52′41″E
- Area: 3,929.9 hectares (9,711 acres)
- Established: 1980 as national park, and as nature park in 2003

The Shumen Plateau Nature Park (Bulgarian: Природен парк Шуменско плато) is located in the Shumen Plateau of the northern province of Shumen of Bulgaria, the highest plateau of the Danubian Plain. The Park encloses the Bukaka Reserve Forest, which is known for indigenous Fagus sylvatica (common beech) moesiaca (the Balkan beech) forest. This Park was declared a National Park in 1980 and a Nature Park in 2003 to conserve its ecosystems and floral and faunal biodiversity, and to preserve its tableland landscape together with many tourist sites such as the Shumen fortress, the Monument to 1300 Years of Bulgaria, cave monasteries, and surface and underground karst caves. The park has the first thematic educational trail in the Karst Nature Park, constructed as part of a project titled "Natural Park of Shumen Plateau" with funds provided by the EU Cohesion Fund and the Republic of Bulgaria; the trail is integral to the Operational Program "Environment 2007–2013".

== Geography ==
Located in Northeast Bulgaria, the park is part of the Shumen Plateau, which in turn is integral to the "Shumen Heights" to its east. The plateau is one of three zones of the Shumen Heights, the other two being the Balkan area in its central part and the Fiseka on its west. Together, the three zones are in the shape of an irregular rectangle oriented in northwest–southeast direction. The river valleys in this area form the shape of segmented bays.

The entire plateau is delimited on the northern border by the Pakosha, Strazhka, and Chairdere river valleys; by Pakosha and Vranato valleys on its west; by the Vrana, Ticha, and Kamchiya river valleys on the south; and the lowlands of the Shumen-Smyadovo border on the east, while the Fiseka mountain rises to a height of 500.5 metres (1,642 ft) in a north-west direction. The plateau is 12 kilometres (7.5 mi) long from west to east; and 7–8 kilometres (4.3–5.0 mi) wide south to north, 7–8 kilometres (4.3–5.0 mi) wide in the far south; 9–10 kilometres (5.6–6.2 mi) wide in the central part; 11–12 kilometres (6.8–7.5 mi) wide towards the north and about 20 kilometres (12 mi) wide in the northern extremity. Width wise, the plateau is oriented in north–south direction and extends 15 kilometres (9.3 mi) and 17 kilometres (11 mi) respectively. The plateau covers a total area of 73.13 square kilometres (28.24 sq mi).

The Shumen Plateau Nature Park encloses the Bukaka Reserve Forest, which covers a total forest area of 63.04 hectares (155.8 acres). This forest is protected on account of its indigenous Fagus sylvatica (common beech) moesiaca (the Balkan beech) forest" that is several hundred years old. The only human activity allowed within this reserve is use of trails which pass through it. The Shumen Plateau occupies the highest plateau in the Danubian Plain, with an elevation of 502 metres (1,647 ft), and features "bizarre and fantastic rock phenomena and underground Karst forms".

== History ==
The Shumen Plateau is part of the Natura 2000 network and was designated per the Council Directive 92/43/EEC for the conservation of natural habitats and of wild fauna and flora. Within this plateau, the park is demarcated over an area of 3,929.9 hectares (9,711 acres). It lies in the eastern part of the Danubian Plain, near the town of Shumen, and was declared a National Park in 1980 and a Nature Park in 2003. The responsibility of park's management is with the government of Bulgaria and is dictated under the Management Plan for Nature Parks and the Protected Areas Act (1998).

== Biology ==
The park and the plateau have distinctive topographic features and plateau's water resources, climate and soil conditions dictate the biodiversity of its plant species.

=== Flora ===
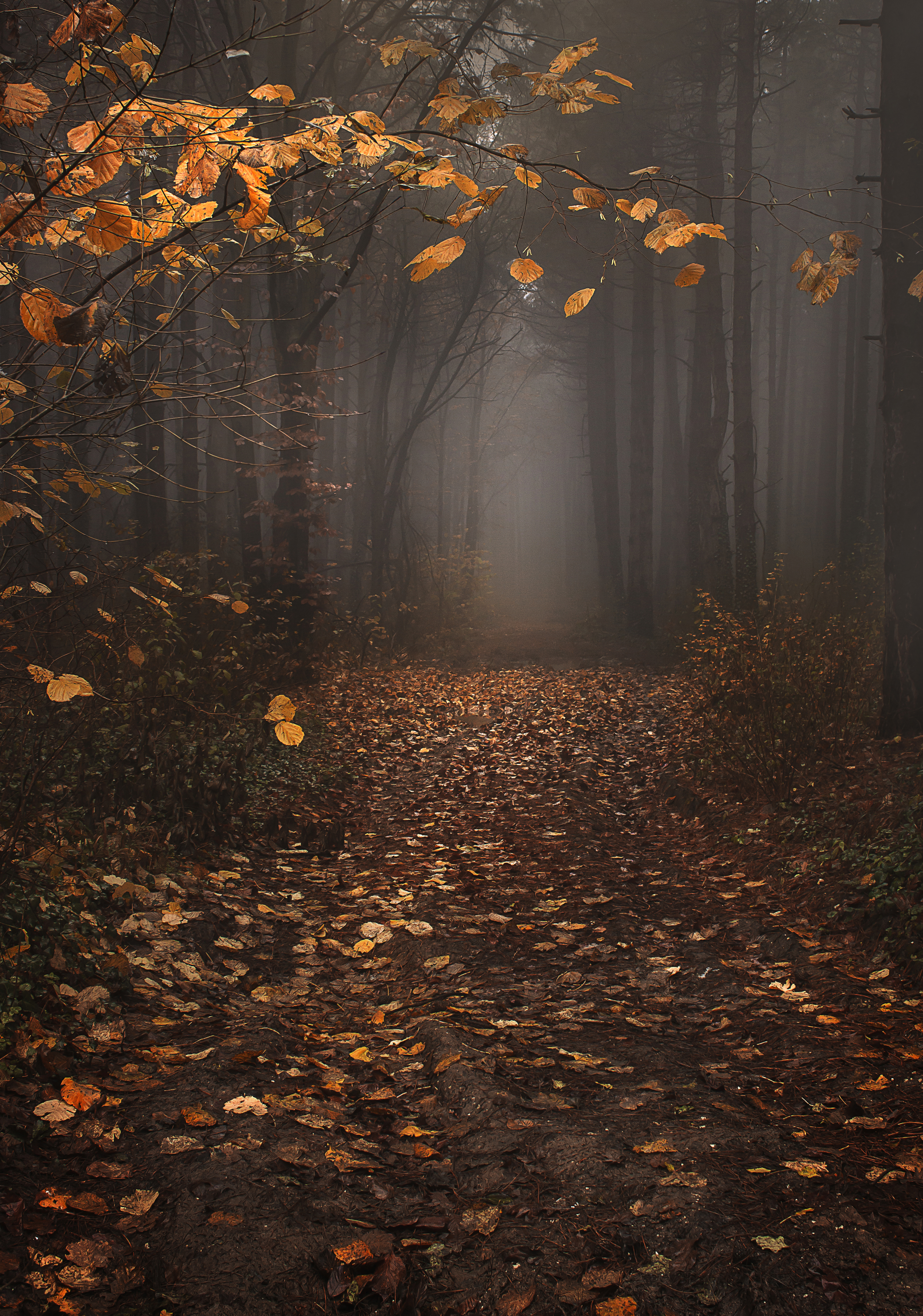
Foggy wooded area of the park

The park has a dense forest area, with about 90% area covered by forests mostly of the mixed deciduous forests. The plants and tree species reported from this forest, are: ash (Fraxinus), beech (Fagus), European hornbeam (Carpinus betulus), lime (Tilia), maple (Acer campestre), Turkey oak (Quercus cerris), and many more. The forest's conifer vegetation consists of: European black pine (Pinus nigra), Norway spruce (Picea abies), Oregon pine (Pseudotsuga menziesii), Scots pine (Pinus sylvestris), and spruce (Picea). The shrub species reported are: dog rose (Rosa canina), the European Cornel (Cornus mas), the hawthorn (Crataegus), and the hazel (Corylus). The open area of the park is covered with several species of bush and grass. Other plant species reported are 14 types of orchid (Orchidaceae) and more than 250 species of herbal plants. The Management Plan for the park lists 550 species of vascular plants (excluding mosses).

=== Fauna ===
The faunal species reported consist of 350 invertebrates and more than 240 vertebrates. The mammals recorded are: badger (Meles meles), beech marten (Martes foina), fox (Vulpes vulpes), red deer (Cervus elaphus), roe deer (Capreolus capreolus), wild boar (Sus scrofa) and soforth. There are also several species of avifauna. The reptile species reported include Aesculapian snake (Elaphe longissima), European green lizard (Lacerta viridis), Hermann's tortoise (Testudo hermanni), horned viper (Vipera ammodytes), spur-thighed tortoise (Testudo graeca), and wall lizard (Podarcis muralis). Animals, which are under different protection categories, reported in the park are: black woodpecker (Dryocopus martius), Eurasian eagle-owl (Bubo bubo), lesser spotted eagle (Aquila pomarina), marbled polecat (Vormela peregusna), Northern goshawk (Accipiter gentilis), and Romanian hamster (Mesocricetus newtoni).

== Cultural heritage ==
There are many cultural landmarks in the park. These are:

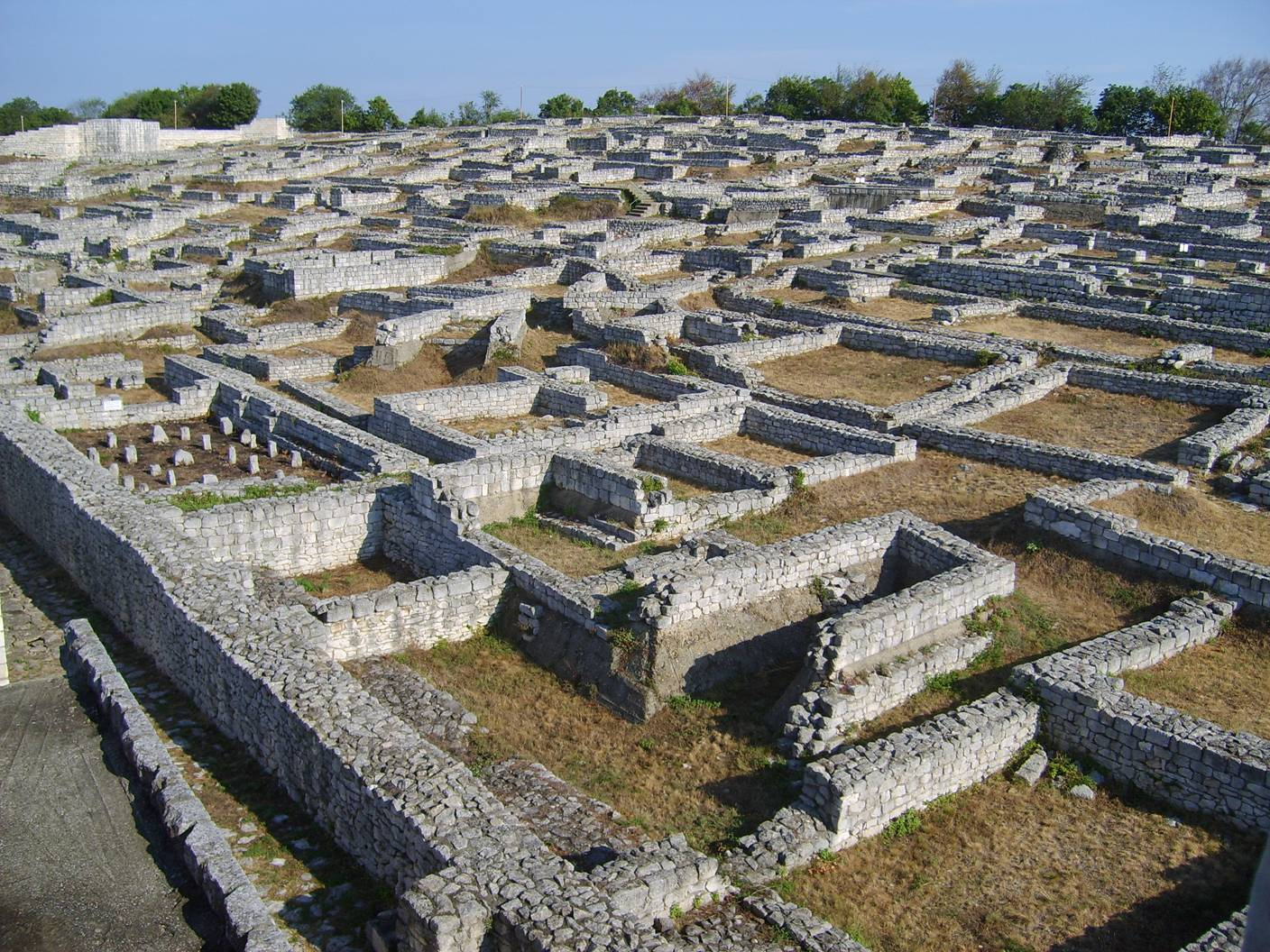
Restored features of the Shumen fortress

The Shumen fortress, also known locally as the Old Town of Shumen, is an archaeological site. It was built on a hill with a commanding view of the city. The fortress is located within the park. The fortress was the location of the town of Shumen during the First and Second Bulgarian Empire (12th – 14th centuries). Thracians ruled over the territory from the 5th to 2nd century BC, followed by Romans who ruled from first century BC to 3rd century AD, and then by the early Byzantine from 4th to 6th century AD. The site consisted of refined residences, religious buildings, and defense fortifications. After the Ottoman conquest of Bulgaria, the fortress was besieged and occupied in 1444 by the forces of King Władysław III of Poland during the Crusade of Varna. Following this battle the fortress was looted and gutted, and the Ottoman rulers eventually abandoned the fortress completely. It has since been partially restored.

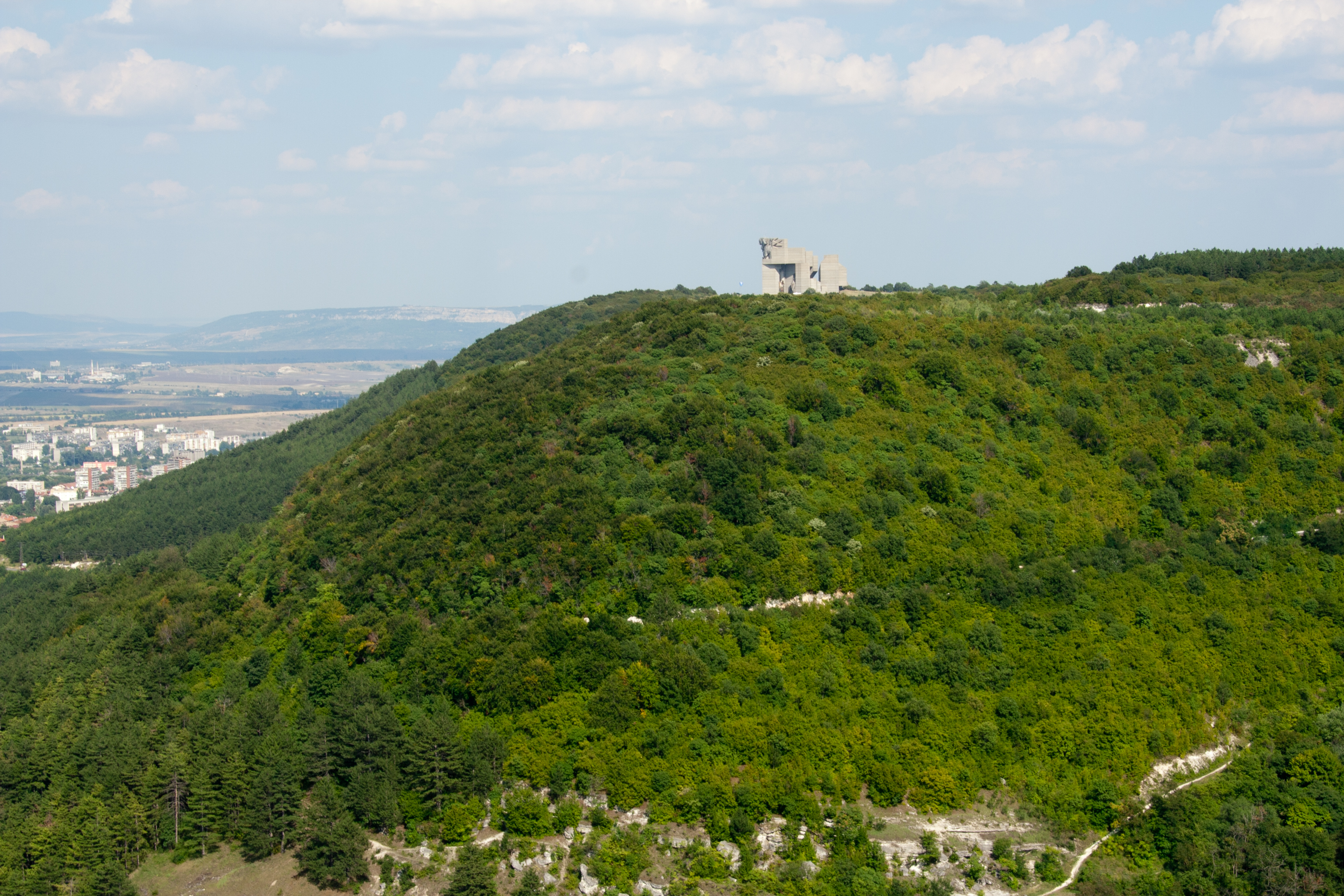
"Creators of the Bulgarian State" monument on the top of a hill in the park

The Founders of the Bulgarian State Monument or Creators of the Bulgarian State monument, is another notable monument within the park, built to commemorate the 1300th anniversary of the establishment of Bulgaria, starting from the First Bulgarian Empire (7th century – 11th century). This monument, which is about 3 kilometres (1.9 mi) distance from the entrance of the Shumen fortress, was built in 1981 during the communist regime. An information center is situated 300 metres (980 ft) away from this monument and a 3 kilometres (1.9 mi) track from here leads to the Shumen fortress.

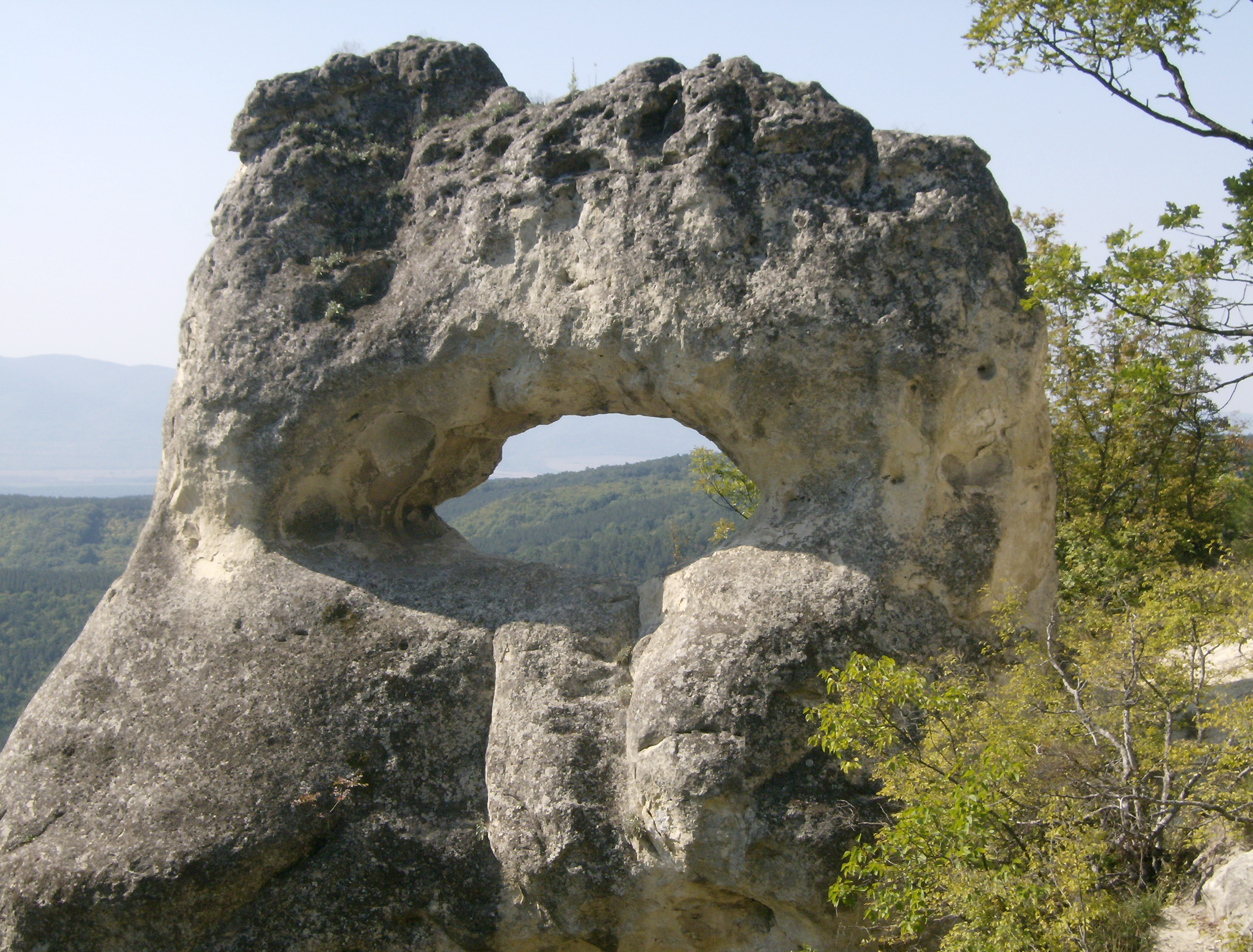
Rock-hewn Churches of Osmar

There are cave monasteries which functioned during the Second Bulgarian Empire as religious and cultural centres. They are located in karstic rock formations in the plateau and are difficult to access. Some of the notable caves are the Biserna Cave (Pearl Cave) and the Taynite Ponori Cave (the Secret Ponors Cave).

Karstic limestone formations, which comprise the main geological formations of the park and the plateau, are found in the park in the form of ponors (sinkholes) in small canyons and rock rims.

=== Trails ===
The park has the first thematic educational trail in the Karst Nature Park, constructed as part of a project titled "Natural Park of Shumen Plateau" with funds provided by the EU Cohesion Fund and the Republic of Bulgaria, which is integral to the Operational Program "Environment 2007–2013".

== Bibliography ==
- Baker, Mark; Deliso, Chris (2013). Lonely Planet Romania & Bulgaria. Lonely Planet. ISBN 978-1-74321-637-8.
- Cheynet, Jean-Claude; Sode, Claudia (2006). Studies in Byzantine Sigillography. Walter de Gruyter. ISBN 978-3-11-093821-0.
- Kassabova, Kapka (2008). Bulgaria. New Holland Publishers. ISBN 978-1-84537-564-5.
- Watkins, Richard; Deliso, Christopher (2008). Bulgaria. Ediz. Inglese. Lonely Planet. ISBN 978-1-74104-474-4.
