= Patriarch Joachim II =

Patriarch Joachim II may refer to:

- Joachim II of Bulgaria, Patriarch of Bulgaria c. 1263–1272
- Joachim II of Constantinople, Patriarch of Constantinople in 1860–1863 and 1873–1878
