= Shumen =

City in Bulgaria

Shumen Шумен
- City
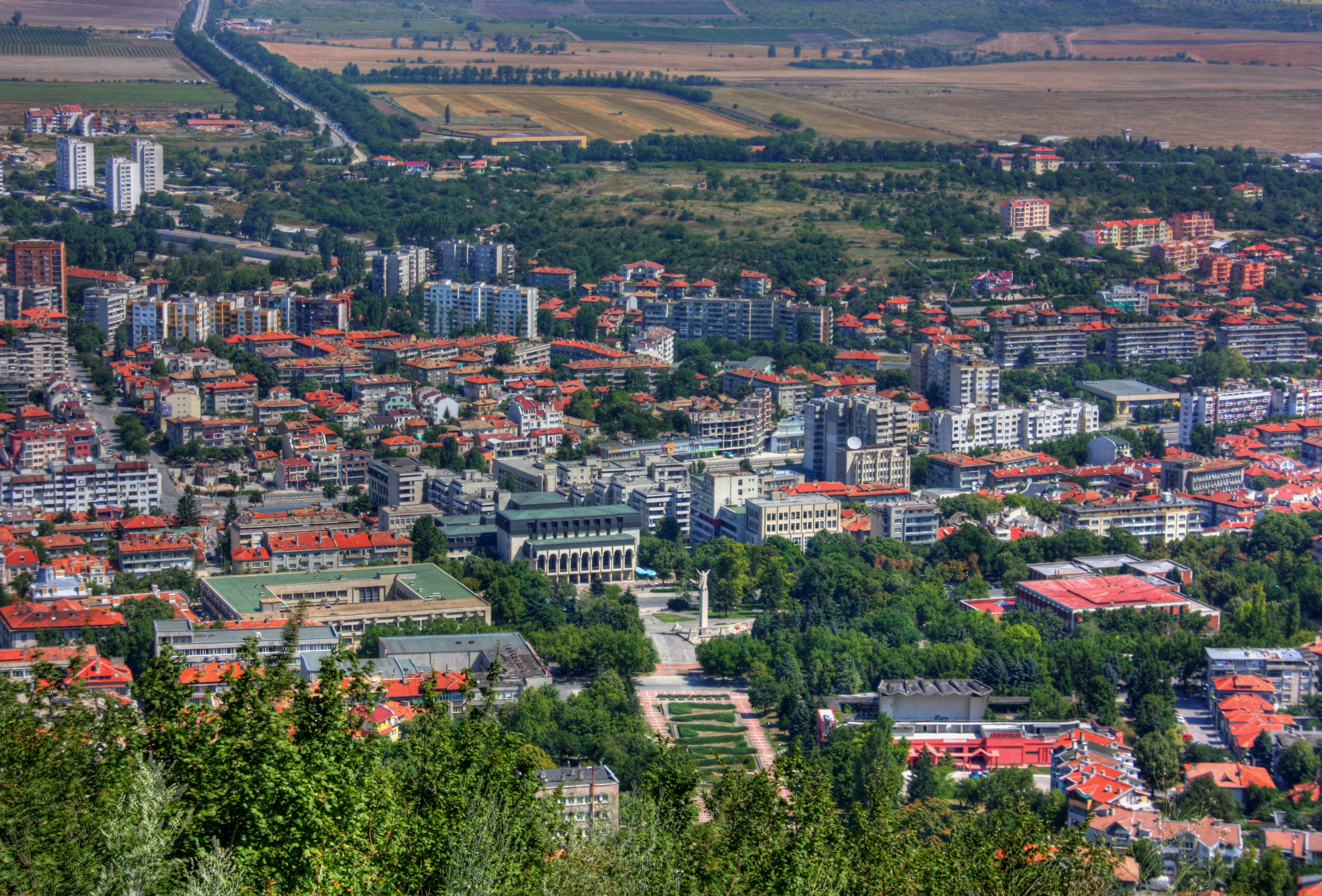
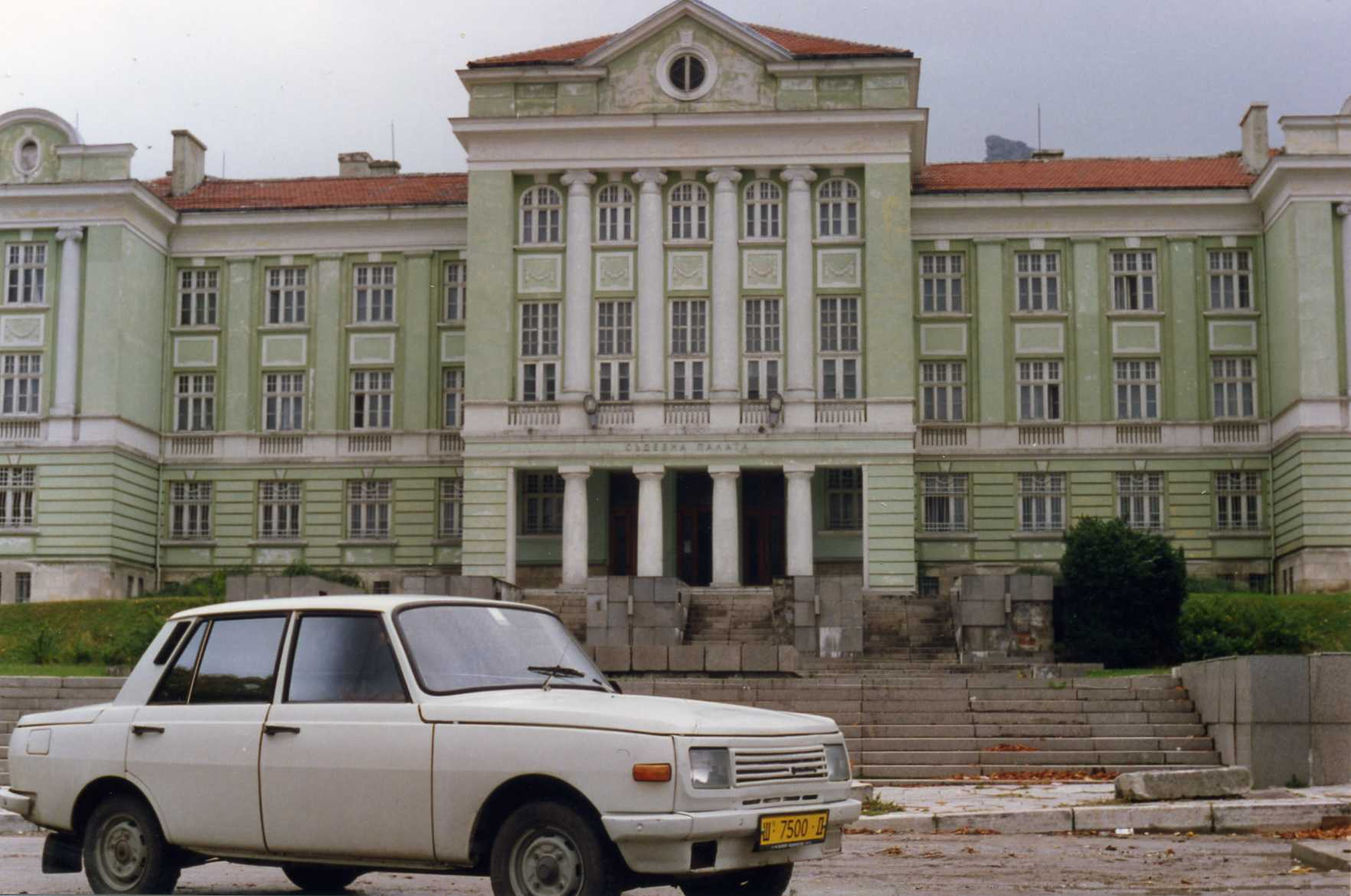
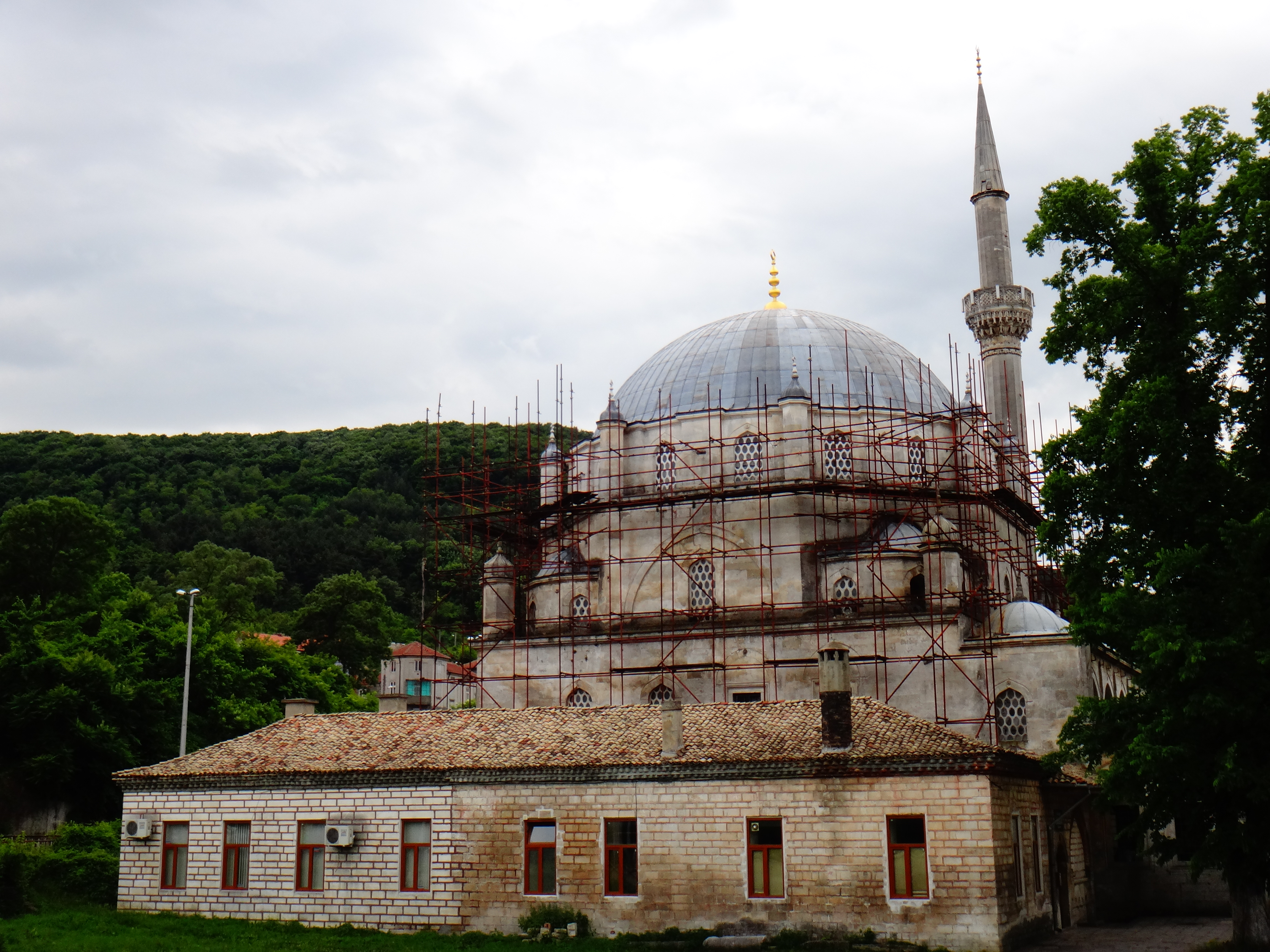
- From the top, View of Shumen from above, Palace of Justice, Tombul Mosque

- Flag Seal

- Location of Shumen Shumen (Balkans)
- Coordinates: 43°17′N 26°56′E
- Country: Bulgaria
- Province (Oblast): Shumen

Government
  - Mayor: Hristo Hristov (BSP)

Area
  - City: 136.358 km^{2} (52.648 sq mi)
- Elevation: 184 m (604 ft)

Population (2021)
  - City: 72,342
  - Urban: 85,410
- Time zone: UTC+2 (EET)
  - Summer (DST): UTC+3 (EEST)
- Postal Code: 9700
- Area code: 054
- License plate: H
- Website: www.shumen.bg/en

Shumen (Bulgarian: Шумен, also romanized as Shoumen or Šumen, pronounced [ˈʃumɛn], Turkish: Şumnu) is the tenth-largest city in Bulgaria and the administrative and economic capital of Shumen Province.

== Etymology ==
The city was first mentioned as Šimeonis in 1153 by the Arab traveler Idrisi. The name is probably from Bulgarian shuma '(deciduous forest).' Some believe Konstantin Jireček that it comes from the name of the Bulgarian emperor Simeon the Great. In the following periods, the city was mentioned with variants, such as Şumena, Şumna, Şumular, Sumunum, Şumnu, and Şumen. The eleventh edition of the Encyclopædia Britannica lists it as Shumla, similar to the way it lists Pleven as Plevna. In Turkish, it is known as Şumnu.

== History ==
=== Antiquity and the Middle Ages ===
The first records of Shumen date back to the Chalcolithic. Excavations by Raphael Popov in 1907 founded the settlement mound Kodzadermen, inhabited in the Middle and Late Chalcolithic (approximately 4500-4000 BC). It has a diameter of 60 m and a height of 5 m and, located 6 km north of the town.

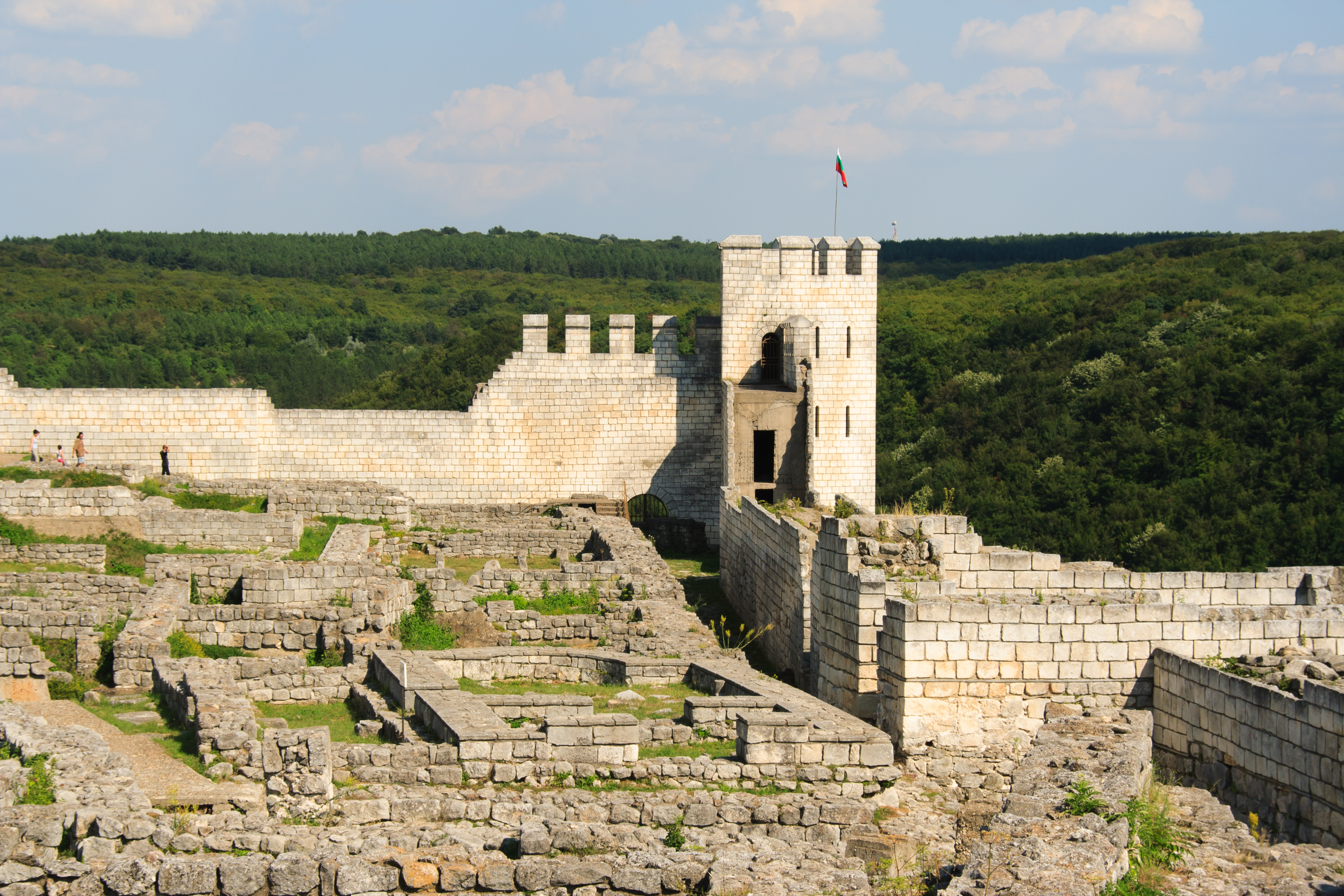
Restored wall fragments and tower of the Shumen fortress, with ruins in the foreground.

Earliest reports for Shumen fortress date back to the early Iron Age. From the 12th century BC is the first fort, surrounding accessible parts of the area. Archaeological surveys, conducted in 1957, 1961 to 1987, determined the chronological periods, the lifestyle and the livelihood of the inhabitants of the fortress. It had a wall thickness of about two meters, built of rough stones. In the 5th century BC a second wall was built in front of the former.

In the 2nd century the Romans built a military fortress on the ruins of the Thracian fortifications. The construction of the wall is already bonded to mortar; a tower was constructed above the gate; square tower was built to the west and semicircular to the south. In the 4-5th centuries the entire hill was fortified with a new wall with nine towers. Between the 8th and the 10th century the fort was renovated, for the purpose the Roman wall and towers were used and to the northeast was built a new wall with two towers.

=== Middle Ages ===
In 681 khan Asparukh incorporated the territory into the First Bulgarian Empire. In 811 Shumen was burned by the Byzantine emperor Nicephorus. He was killed at the Battle of Pliska. Khan Krum of Bulgaria encased Nicephorus's skull in silver and used it as a cup for wine drinking. The Bulgarian fortification of the 7-10th centuries developed into a feudal city with a castle with surrounding inner and outer defensive zones, in which can be counted 28 towers and bastions, three gates and five small porticoes, and many churches and workshops (12th to 14th century). During the golden age of Bulgarian culture under Simeon the Great (893–927), Shumen was a centre of cultural and religious activity, and may have borne the name Simeonis.

During the Second Bulgarian Empire, Shumen was a significant military, administrative and economic center, displacing the old Bulgarian capital Preslav and developing outside the fortress. In the medieval city of Shumen the main religion was the Orthodox Christianity, evidence of which were the found in the outline of the walls, seven churches, commemorative coins with the image of crosses, angels, and numerous findings of Orthodox crosses separately, as well as their image on rings and on other artefacts, found in the graves and the homes. Change occurs only after the Ottoman conquest of the city in the 15th century, when Islam was introduced.

=== Ottoman Empire ===
In 1388 the sultan Murad I forced it to surrender to the Ottoman Empire. After Władysław Warneńczyk's unsuccessful crusade in 1444, the city was destroyed by the Ottomans and moved to its present location.

After the Middle Ages, the Turks used the ruins of the city for the construction of the several baths and mosques. In the 17th - 18th centuries Shumen was turned into a strongly fortified military town, with a large garrison in the fortress, many Turks, Jews, Tatars, Armenians settled there. According to Konstantin Jirecek, at the time of the Ottoman conquest there were 800 houses in Shumen, and in the 17th century they already numbered 4000–5000. In the 18th century it was enlarged and fortified. Three times (1774, 1810 and 1828) it was unsuccessfully attacked by Russian armies. The Turks consequently gave it the name of Gazi ("Victorious"). In 1854 it was the headquarters of Omar Pasha and the point at which the Turkish army concentrated (see Crimean War). Many Turks were settled in the area during the Ottoman period to spread the Islamic faith among the Slavic Bulgarian Christians and many Muslim Turkic men married Bulgarian women and converted them to Islam during the period .

==== Bulgarian National Revival ====
In the 19th century Shumen was a communication hub of importance in the Ottoman Empire. In 1820 Porter wrote that Shumen had "a suburb in which its Christian inhabitants live".

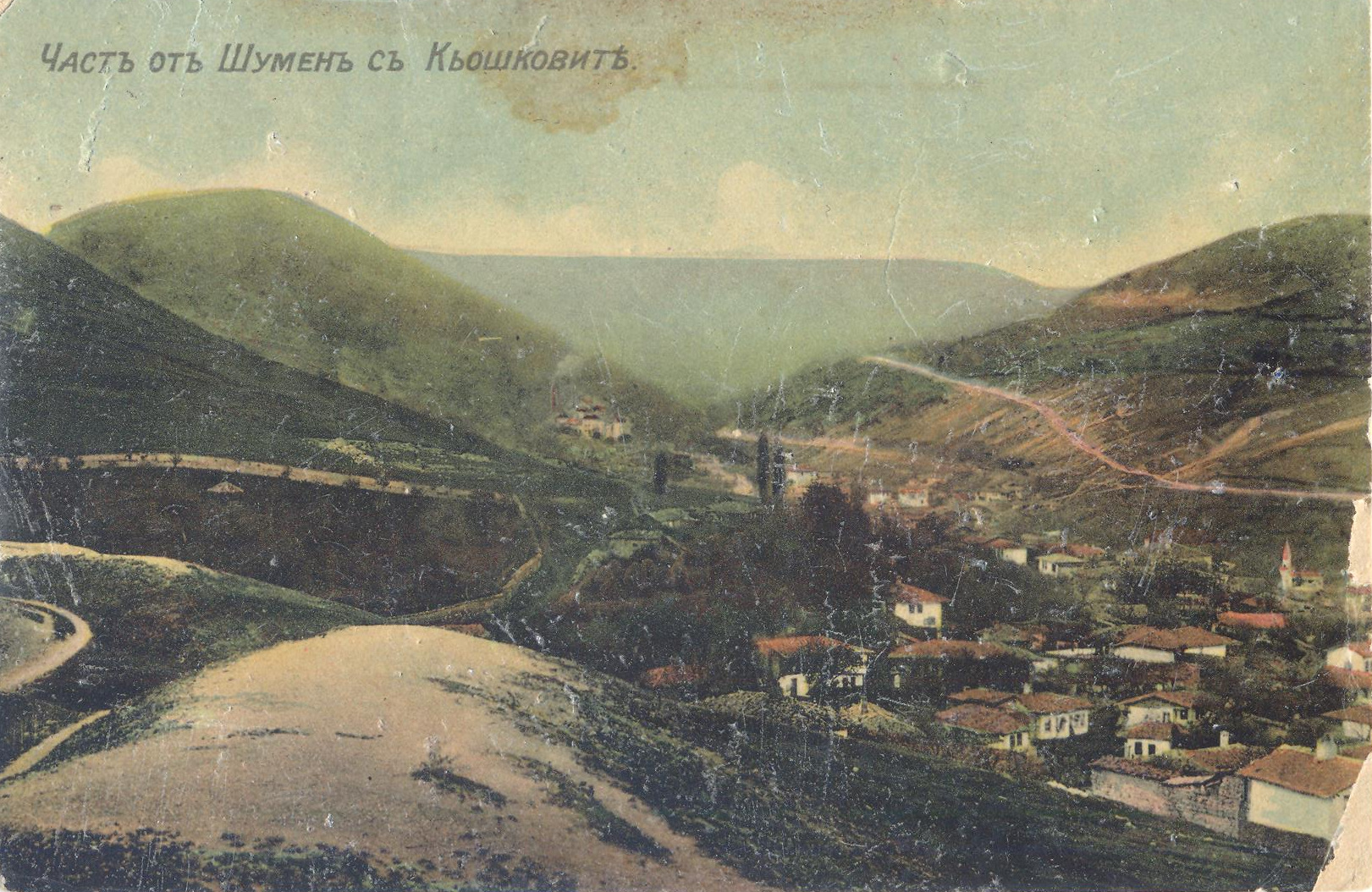
Postcard from Shumen, 1912

During the 19th century, Shumen was an important centre of the Bulgarian National Revival, with the first celebration of Cyril and Methodius in the Bulgarian lands taking place on 11 May 1813 and the first theatre performance. A girls' religious school was established in 1828; a class school for girls and a chitalishte (community centre) followed in 1856. The first Bulgarian symphony orchestra was founded in the city in 1850. In the same year, influential Hungarian politician and revolutionary leader Lajos Kossuth spent a part of his exile in the then-Ottoman town of Shumen. The house he lived in is preserved as a museum.

=== Third Bulgarian State ===
==== Tsardom of Bulgaria ====
On 22 June 1878 Shumen finally capitulated to the Russians and became part of the newly independent Bulgaria. In 1882 the Shumen Brewery, the first brewery in Bulgaria, was founded. After the Liberation of Bulgaria, the town initially declined due to the loss of markets for its crafts, the withdraw of many Ottomans and the relatively cheap and high quality western manufactured goods competing with local ones, but gradually recovered, becoming a regional and district centre. At the outbreak of the First Balkan War in 1912, 35 people from Shumen volunteered for the Macedonian-Drinsk Volunteer Force.

As technology improved, electricity gradually began to make inroads. It was initially installed at the city's Military Club (1919). In September 1927, the first electric power plant began operating in the town of Shumen.

Immediately after the 1944 Bulgarian coup d'état, a serious shootout took place in the city when communists tried to take over one of the police stations.

==== People's Republic of Bulgaria ====
In the period 1950–1965 the city was called Kolarovgrad, after the name of the communist leader Vasil Kolarov.

One of the largest monumental memorials in Bulgaria - "Monument to 1300 Years of Bulgaria" - was built in Shumen Plateau Nature Park in 1981. In the 1980s, large-scale construction was underway in view of the upcoming visit of the diplomatic corps, but changes in the late 1980s halted the process. The largest hotel-restaurant complex in the city was built. Construction of a trolleybus line began, which was later abandoned.

==== Republic of Bulgaria ====
After 1989 a mall was built in Shumen (GUM). The town's iconic restaurants with a hotel part, the "Kyoshkovete" and the "Stekloto" were rebuilt and restored. A number of new restaurants and hotels have been built in a contemporary style. Following Bulgaria's accession to the European Union, the main boulevards, streets and roads were asphalted. The pedestrian zone from the centre through the town garden to the railway station has been renovated and modernised.

== Geography ==
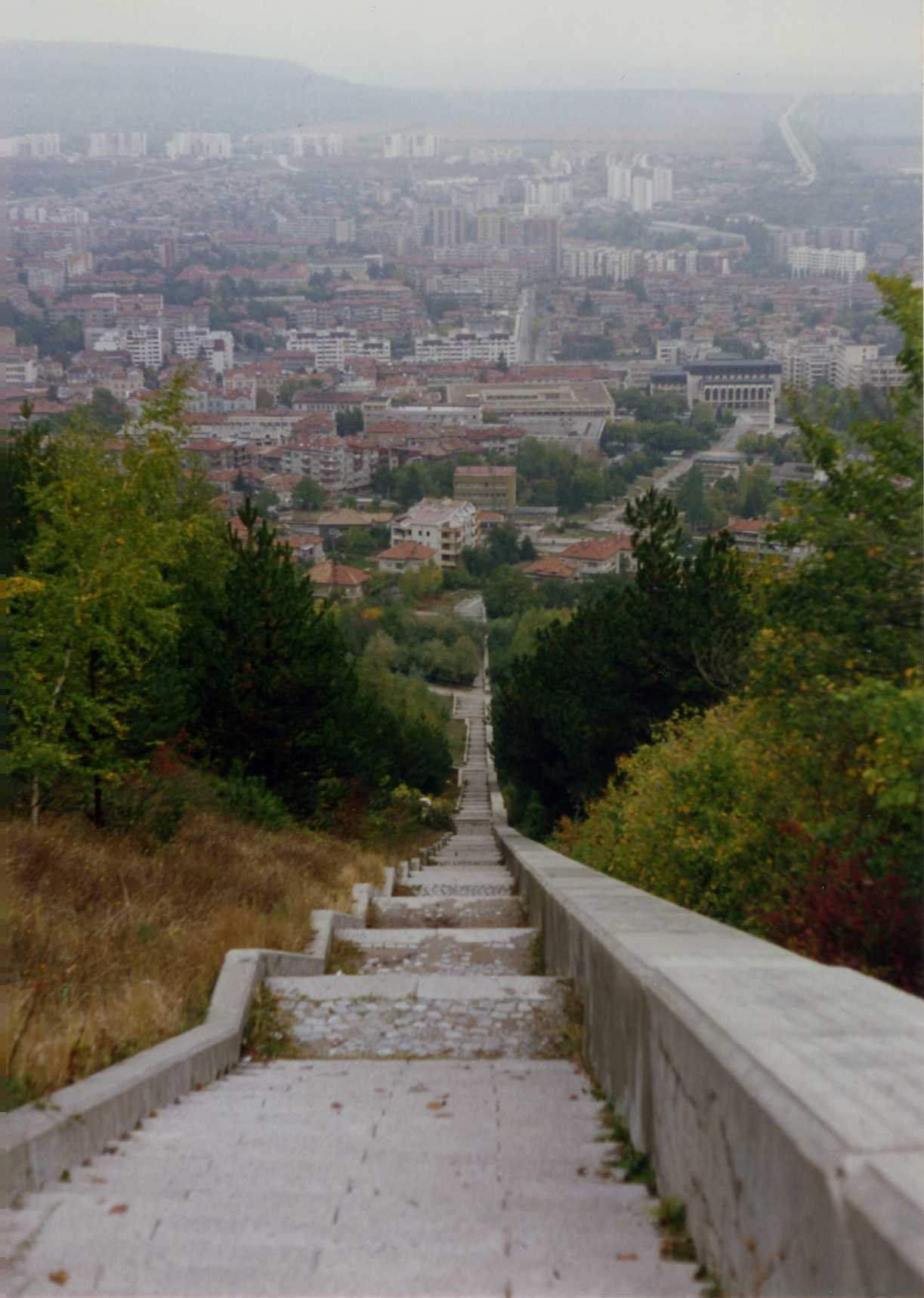
View of the city from the Monument to 1300 Years of Bulgaria, 1993

The city lies 80 kilometres (50 miles) west of Varna and is built within a cluster of hills, northern outliers of the eastern Balkans, which curve around it on the west and south in the shape of a horseshoe. A rugged ravine intersects the ground longitudinally in the horseshoe ridge.

From Shumen roads radiate northwards to the Danubian cities of Rousse and Silistra and to Dobruja, southwards to the passes of the Balkans, and eastwards to Varna and Balchik.

=== Climate ===
Climate data for Shumen
Month	Jan	Feb	Mar	Apr	May	Jun	Jul	Aug	Sep	Oct	Nov	Dec	Year
Mean daily maximum °C (°F)	4.3 (39.7)	6.5 (43.7)	11.3 (52.3)	17.8 (64.0)	23.2 (73.8)	26.5 (79.7)	29.5 (85.1)	30.1 (86.2)	25.1 (77.2)	18.8 (65.8)	12.0 (53.6)	5.8 (42.4)	17.6 (63.7)
Daily mean °C (°F)	0.7 (33.3)	2.6 (36.7)	6.9 (44.4)	12.5 (54.5)	17.2 (63.0)	20.6 (69.1)	23.3 (73.9)	23.7 (74.7)	19.1 (66.4)	13.5 (56.3)	7.9 (46.2)	2.4 (36.3)	12.5 (54.5)
Mean daily minimum °C (°F)	−2.9 (26.8)	−1.3 (29.7)	2.6 (36.7)	7.1 (44.8)	11.2 (52.2)	14.7 (58.5)	17.1 (62.8)	17.2 (63.0)	13.0 (55.4)	8.1 (46.6)	3.9 (39.0)	−1.1 (30.0)	7.2 (45.0)
Average precipitation mm (inches)	36 (1.4)	41 (1.6)	38 (1.5)	53 (2.1)	64 (2.5)	79 (3.1)	48 (1.9)	41 (1.6)	33 (1.3)	41 (1.6)	53 (2.1)	51 (2.0)	580 (23)
Source: Weatherbase

== Population ==
As of October 2021, Shumen was inhabited by 67,971 people, while the Shumen Municipality overall had a population of 79,167 inhabitants. The number of the residents of the city (not the municipality) reached its peak in the period 1990-1991, when it exceeded 110,000.

Historical population
Year	Pop.	±%
1887	23,161	—
1900	23,102	−0.3%
1910	22,225	−3.8%
1920	23,753	+6.9%
1934	25,486	+7.3%
1946	31,327	+22.9%
1956	41,546	+32.6%
1965	59,293	+42.7%
1975	83,505	+40.8%
1985	100,116	+19.9%
1992	93,390	−6.7%
2001	89,214	−4.5%
2011	80,855	−9.4%
2021	67,971	−15.9%

=== Ethnic, linguistic and religious composition ===
According to the latest 2021 census data, the individuals that declared their self-attributed ethnic identity were distributed as follows:

- Bulgarians: 77%
- Turks: 17.5%
- Romani: 3.2%
- Other: 2.3% (including indefinable or undeclared)

=== Religion ===
The population of the city is majorly Eastern Orthodox, with a significant portion of Muslims and much smaller minorities of other religions.

In the Bulgarian Orthodox Church, Shumen is a part of the Eparchy (diocese) of Varna and Veliki Preslav and the capital of the Shumen church district (okolia). There are two major Orthodox temples in the city, the Church of the Holy Ascension (est. 1829) and the Church of the Three Holy Hierarchs (est. 1857), and a few chapels.

The largest mosque in Bulgaria, and second-largest in the Balkans, the Sherif Halil Pasha Mosque, commonly known as the Tombul Mosque, is located in Shumen.

According to the latest 2021 census data, the religious breakdown of the population of the Shumen Municipality is:

- Christian: 72,792 (52.3%)
  - Eastern Orthodox: 71,055
  - Protestant: 1,193
  - Catholic: 239
  - Armenian Apostolic: 145
  - Other denomination: 160
- Muslim: 47,752 (34.3%)
- Judaism: 0.05%
- Other religion: 0.01%
- Undeclared: 7,406 (5.3%)
- Indefinable: 7,298 (5.2%)
- None: 3,846 (2.8%)

== Education and science ==
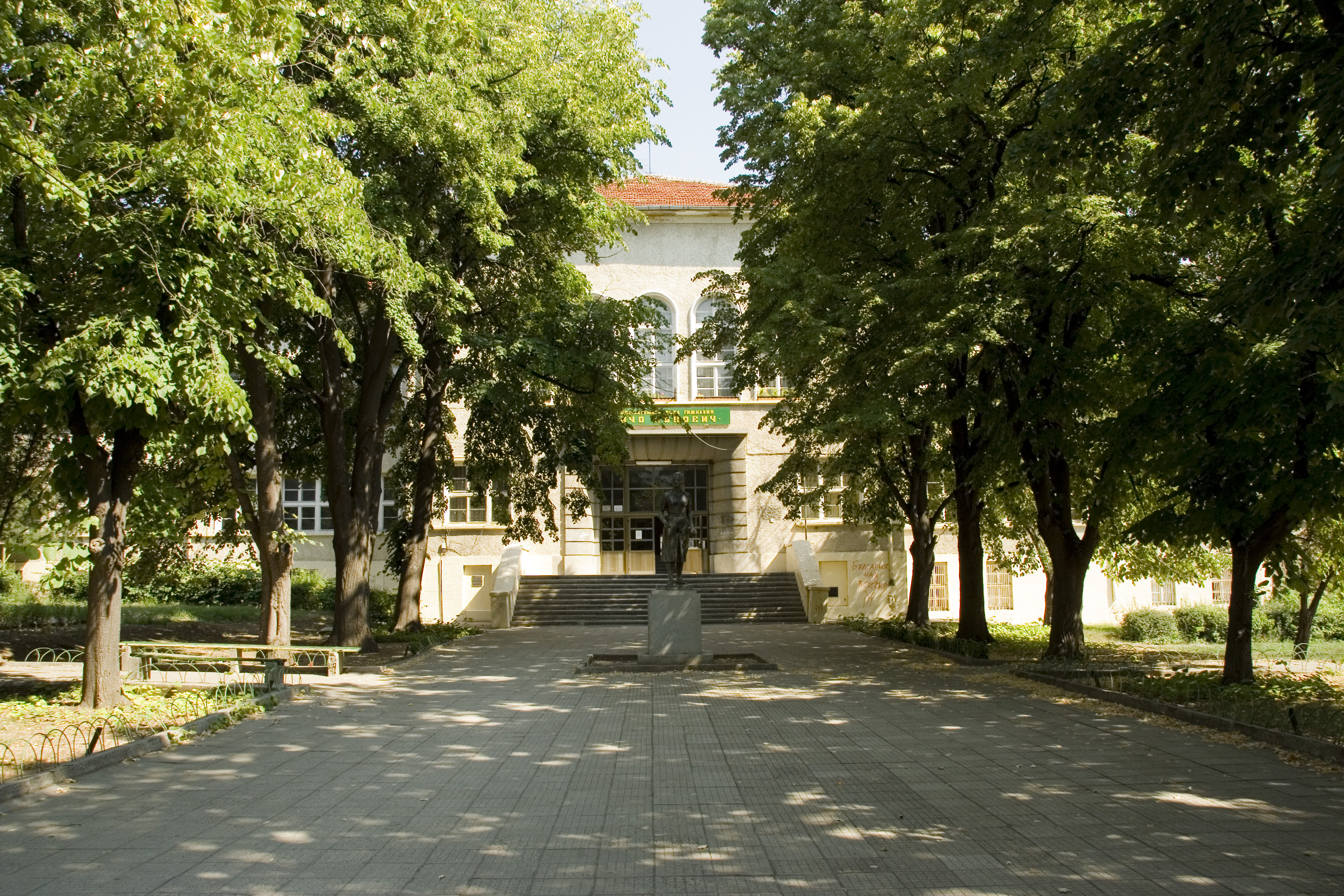
'Nancho Popovich' high school, established in 1828, is one of Bulgaria's oldest educational institutions

Shumen has 11 elementary and five common schools, as well as two high schools. The University of Shumen Episkop Konstantin Preslavski, the Artillery and Air Defense Faculty to the Vasil Levski National Military University and the Affiliate of Medical University of Varna are the higher education establishments in the city. The former operates a small astronomical observatory.

== Sports ==
FC Shumen 1929 was the local football club since 2013 and the financial failure of PFC Shumen 2010. The club used the Panayot Volov Stadium as its home ground. Basketball, volleyball and handball are also represented, and most of the games are held at the 'Mladost' sports centre and Arena Shumen, the 2,300-seater indoor hall opened in 2018.

Other sporting activities include martial arts (mostly karate) and horse racing. Shumen has its own rallying tournament, the 'Stari Stolitsi'.

The Shumen Motopista is a motorcycle speedway track which re-opened in 2016 and is the only speedway track in Bulgaria. The track located on University Street (ул. Университетска), opposite Shumen University, previously held important speedway events, including a qualifying round of the Speedway World Championship in 1981 and 1983 and a qualifying round of the Speedway World Team Cup in 1987 and 1989.

== Main sights ==
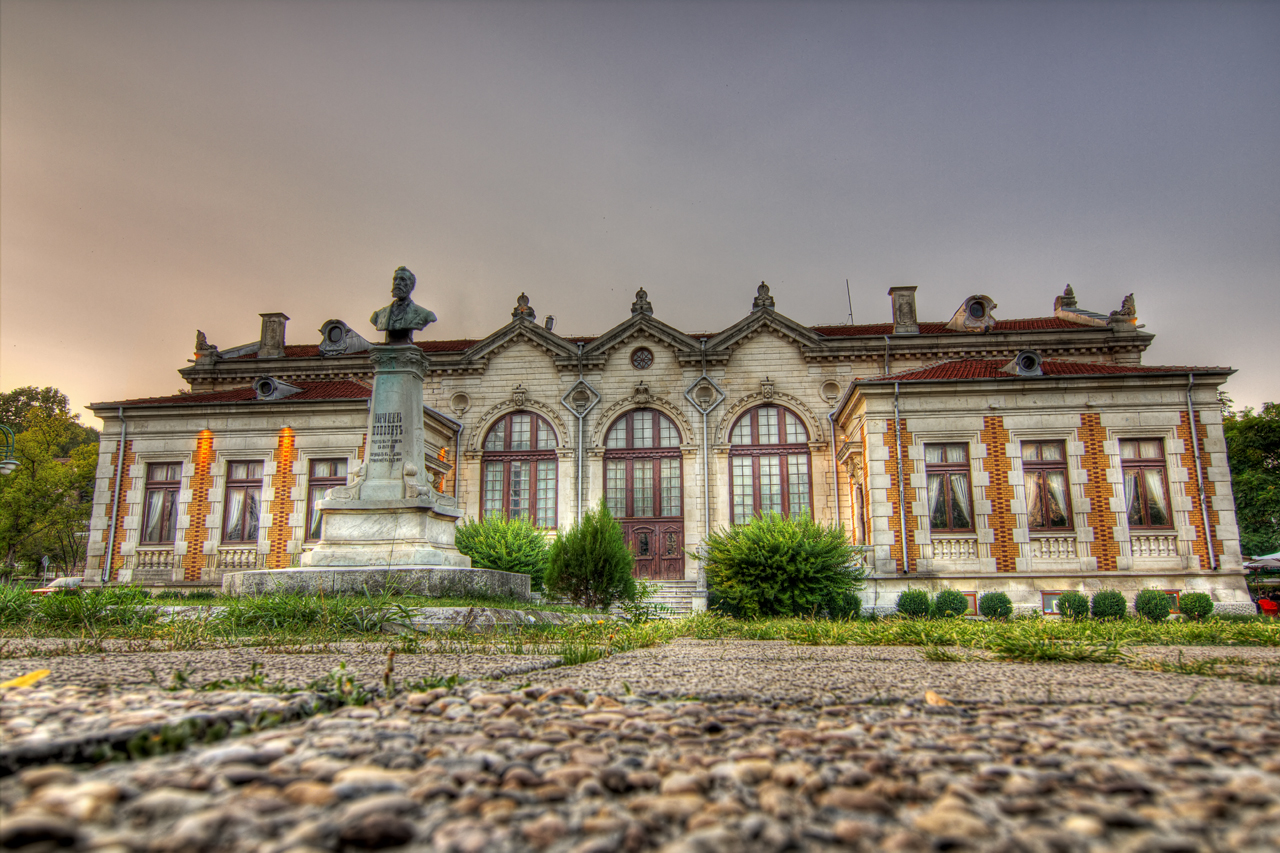
The Dobri Voynikov Chitalishte

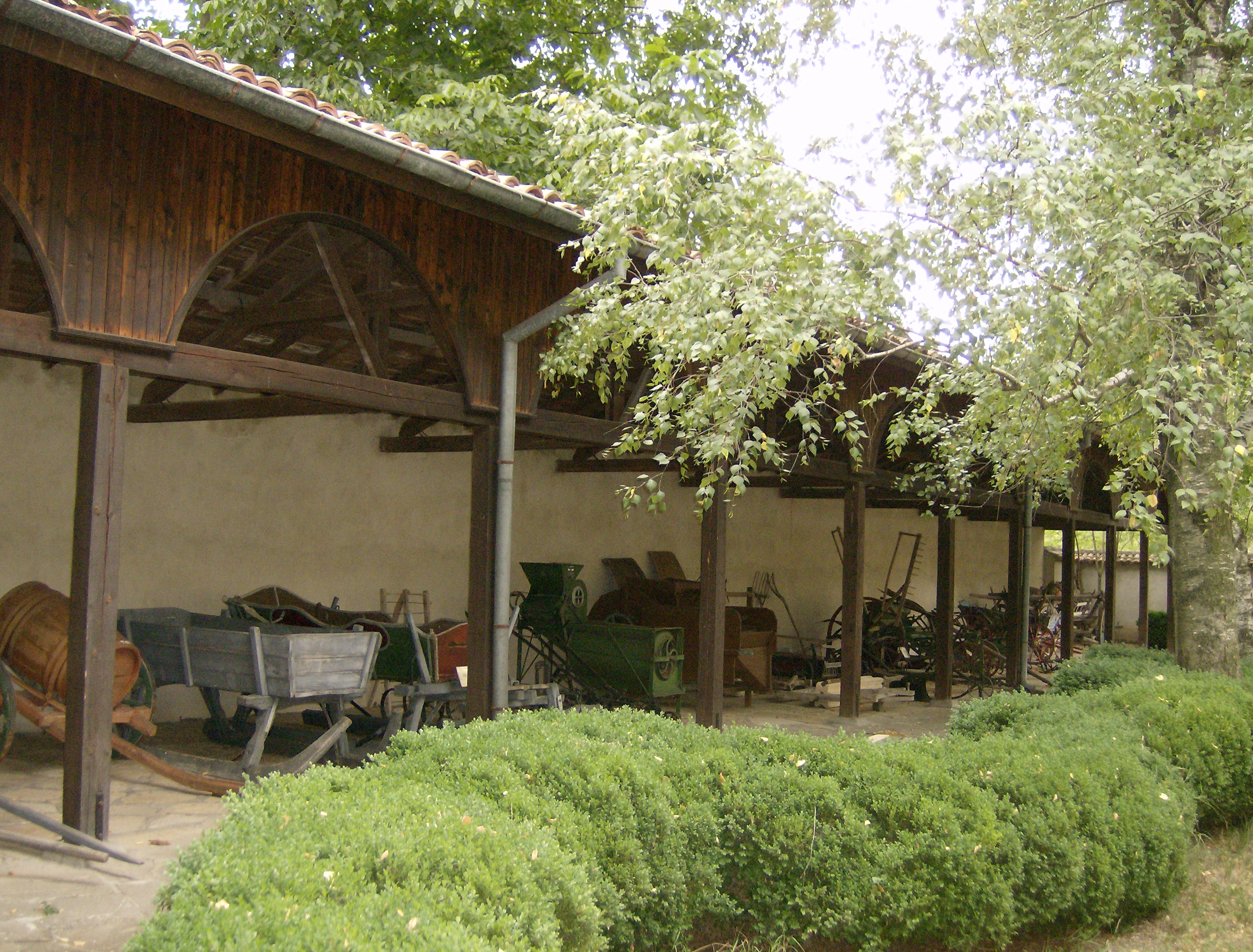
The Kabiuk horse museum

Shumen boasts the Monument to 1300 Years of Bulgaria, regarded as the only monument in the world to depict the history of a whole country from its creation to the present day.

The Shumen Fortress, partially restored after being destroyed by the Ottomans, is an important historical monument of the medieval Bulgarian Empire. It is not far from the city on the Shumen Plateau.

The Regional Historical Museum, which is a successor of the Archaeological Society created in Shumen in 1904 by Rafail Popov.

The Madara Horseman, a World Heritage Site and the only such example of medieval rock art in Europe, is an ancient (710 AD) monument usually attributed to the Bulgar culture. It lies some 20 km (12 mi) from Shumen.

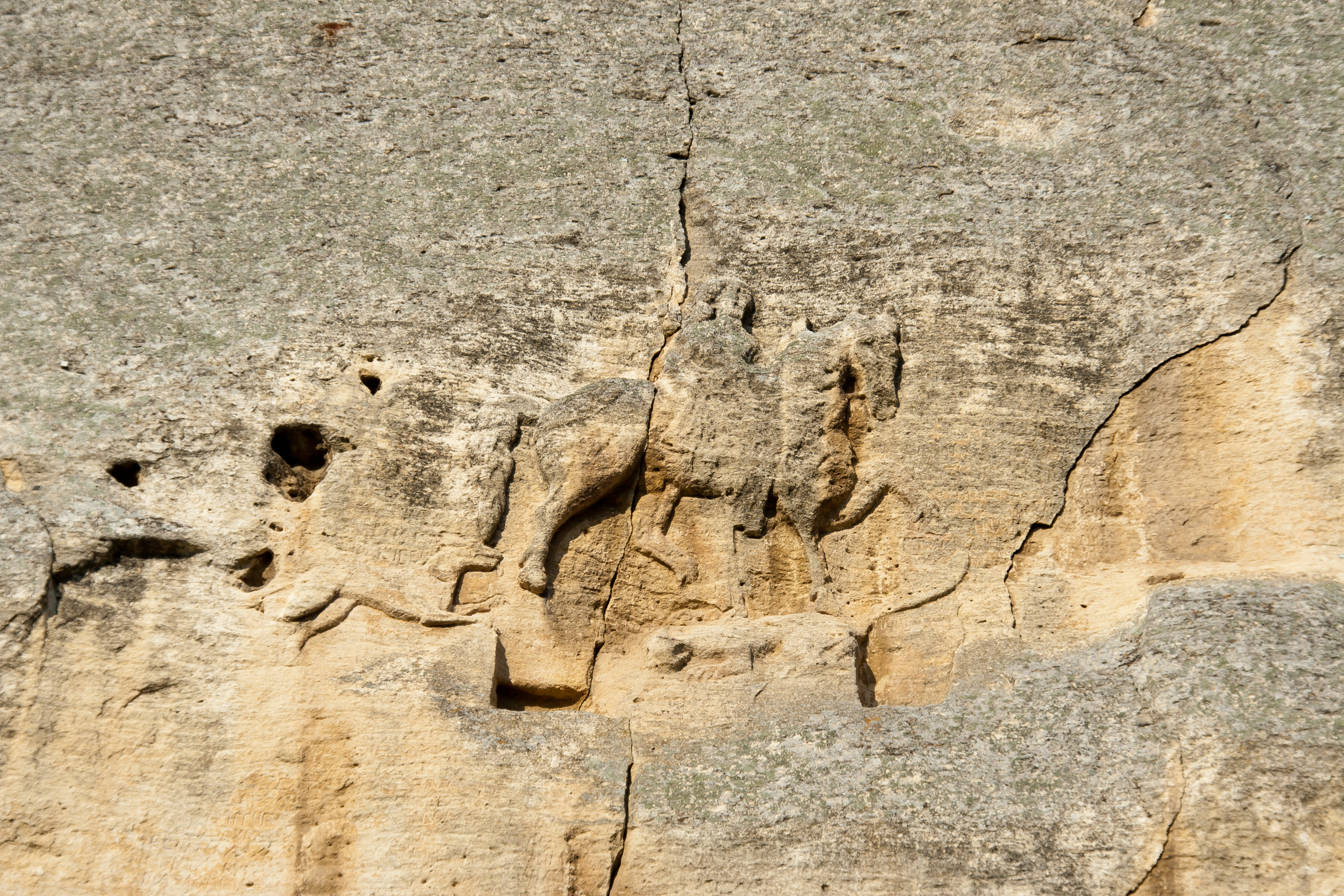
The Madara Rider, present on the reverse of the Bulgarian currency lev and in the seal of Shumen

The religious buildings in the city include the Eastern Orthodox Holy Three Saints Cathedral and Holy Ascension Basilica, as well as the Sherif Halil Pasha mosque (also known as the Tombul Mosque), the largest mosque in Bulgaria and one of the largest in the Balkans, serving Shumen and the region's Muslim minority.

Kurşun çeşme is a fountain built in 1774 built in the times of Ottoman Empire.

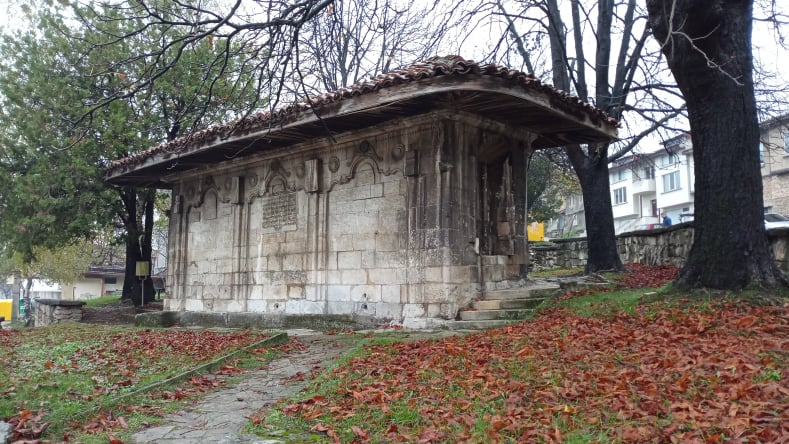
Kurşun çeşme (fountain)

== Notable people ==
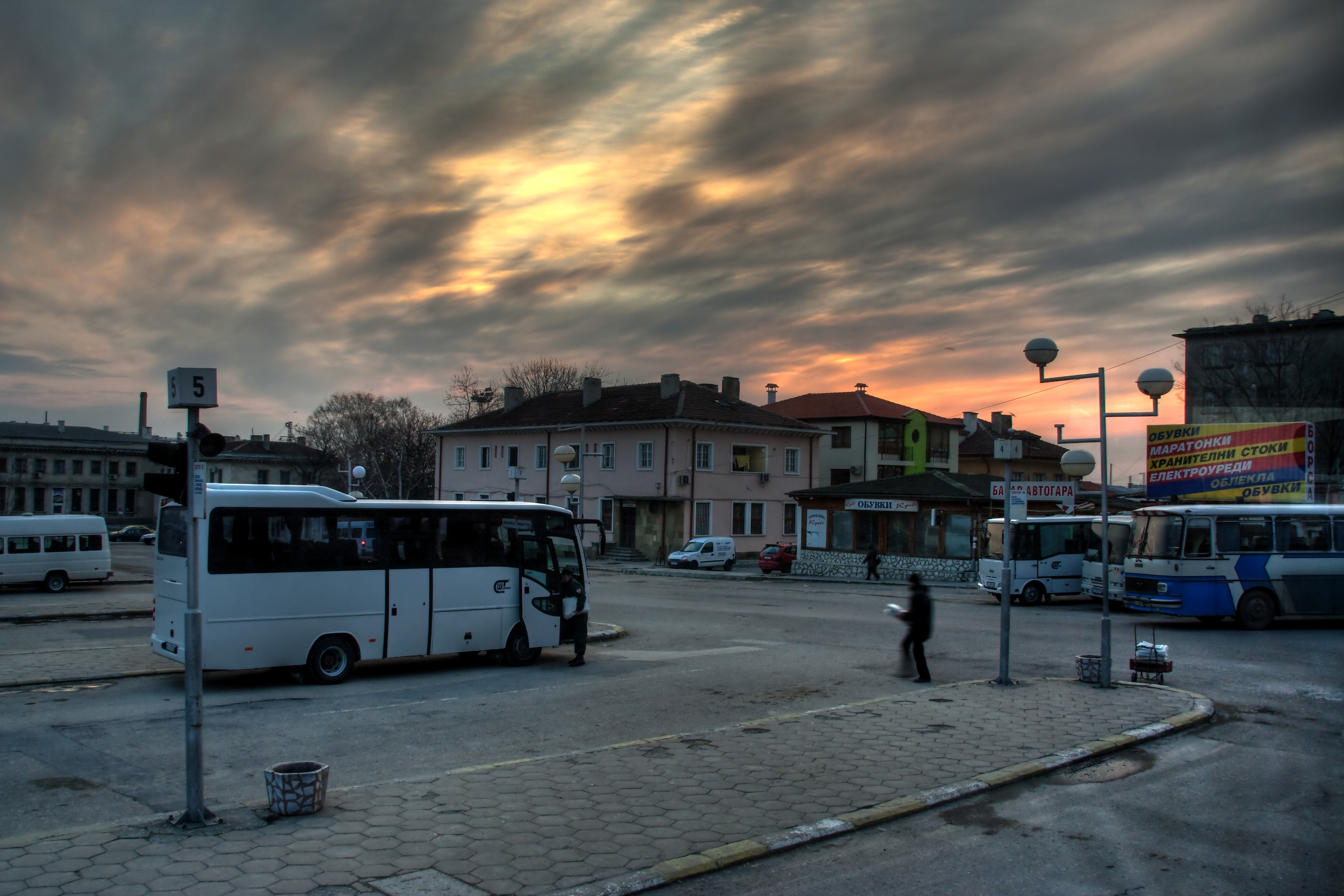
The sky around the bus station

- Maxim Behar (born 1955), public relations expert
- Hacho Boyadzhiev (1932–2012), film director
- Stoyan Danev (1858–1949), politician, twice prime minister of Bulgaria
- Ivan Dochev (1906–2005), anti-communist politician
- Vasil Drumev (Clement of Tarnovo) (1841–1901), clergyman and politician, twice Prime Minister of Bulgaria
- Solomon Goldstein, (1884–1969), politician
- Nikolay Gunderov (born 1974), award-winning playwright, stage director, poet, and actor
- Yusuf İsmail (1857–1898), wrestler
- Vasil Kolarov (1877–1950), politician, Communist leader
- Todor Kolev (1939–2013), actor
- Racho Petrov (1861–1942), a leading Bulgarian general and politician
- Ahmet Fikri Tüzer (1878–1942), Prime Minister of Turkey for one day (8–9 July 1942), born in what was then Şumnu
- Slavena Vatova (1989) Miss Bulgaria 2006
- Veneta Vicheva (1931–2013), choir conductor
- Pancho Vladigerov (1899–1978), composer, pedagogue and pianist
- Panayot Volov (1850–1876), organizer and leader of the Gyurgevo Revolutionary Committee of the Bulgarian April Uprising against the Ottoman Empire in 1876
- Dobri Voynikov (1833–1878), writer and enlightener
- Nadezhda Panayotova, voice actress and singer
- Toni Storaro (born 1976), singer, songwriter
- Fiki (born 1995), singer, son of Toni Storaro

== International relations ==
=== Twin towns – sister cities ===
Shumen is twinned with:

Adapazarı, Turkey; Bloomington, Minnesota, United States; Debrecen, Hungary; Kherson, Ukraine; Mâcon, France	Örebro, Sweden; Podolsk, Russia; Tulcea, Romania; Zhengzhou, China

== Honour ==
Shumen Peak on Livingston Island in the South Shetland Islands, Antarctica is named after Shumen. The tails of the Bulgarian currency lev are the same as the seal of Shumen, showing the Madara Rider, 15 km (9 mi) away from the city.
