= Vissarion of Bulgaria =

- Patriarch of Bulgaria
- Church: Bulgarian Orthodox Church
- Installed: after 1235
- Term ended: before 1241
- Predecessor: Joachim I (?)
- Successor: Joachim I (?)

Personal details
- Denomination: Eastern Orthodox Church

Vissarion (Bulgarian: Висарион) was a Patriarch of the Bulgarian Orthodox Church in the 13th century. He is the only Bulgarian Patriarch who was not included in the list of Patriarchs in the medieval Book of Boril. The only testimony of his existence is an undated seal reading "Vissarion, by the grace of God Patriarch of the Bulgarians". It is suggested that he presided over the Bulgarian Church during the rule of emperor Ivan Asen II (r. 1218–1241) and was omitted in the lists because he supported the union with the Catholic Church concluded by emperor Kaloyan (r. 1197–1207) and abolished by Ivan Asen II.

Bulgarian historians believe he can be identified with "Patriarch Spiridon", known from a recently discovered hagiography, whose name is not mentioned in any historical sources. In 1238 that Patriarch opposed the third marriage of Ivan Asen II to Irene Komnene Doukaina because it was non-canonical. The emperor, who loved Irene "no less than Marcus Antonius loved Cleopatra" according to contemporaries, had the Patriarch persecuted and executed. The Church refused to acknowledge Irene as empress and had Vissarion canonized as a saint and commissioned his hagiography.

== Sources ==
- Андреев (Andreev), Йордан (Jordan); Лалков (Lalkov), Милчо (Milcho) (1996). Българските ханове и царе (The Bulgarian Khans and Tsars) (in Bulgarian). Велико Търново (Veliko Tarnovo): Абагар (Abagar). ISBN 954-427-216-X.
- Андреев (Andreev), Йордан (Jordan); Лазаров (Lazarov), Иван (Ivan); Павлов (Pavlov), Пламен (Plamen) (2012). Кой кой е в средновековна България [Who is Who in Medieval Bulgaria] (in Bulgarian). Изток Запад (Iztok Zapad). ISBN 978-619-152-012-1.

Titles of Chalcedonian Christianity
Preceded by Joachim I (?)	Patriarch of Bulgaria unknown	Succeeded by Joachim I (?)
