= Shumen Fortress =

Archaeological site overlooking the city of Shumen in Bulgaria

- Bulgarian: Шуменска крепост Shumenska krepost
- Shumеn, Bulgaria
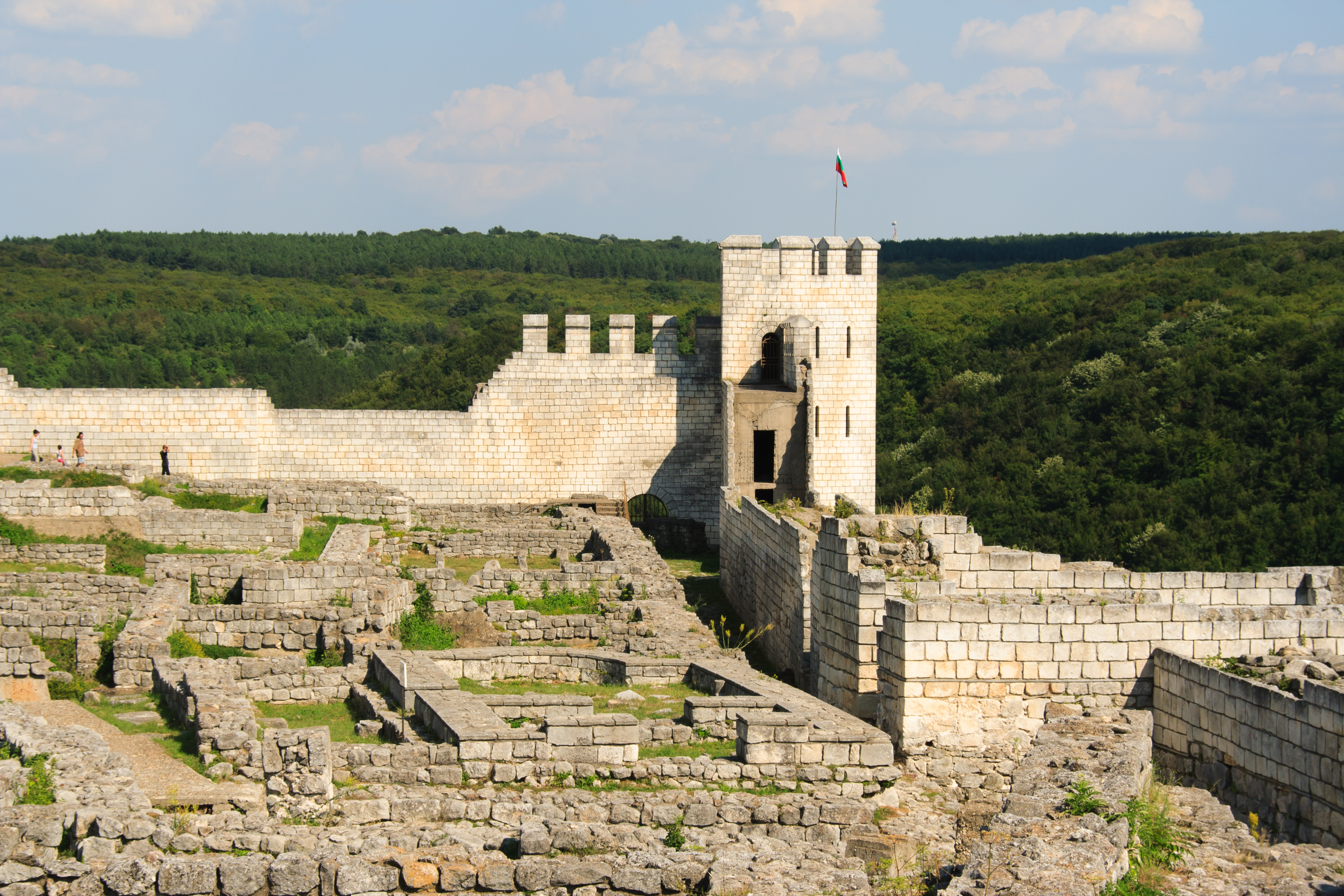
- The main tower of the Shumen Fortress

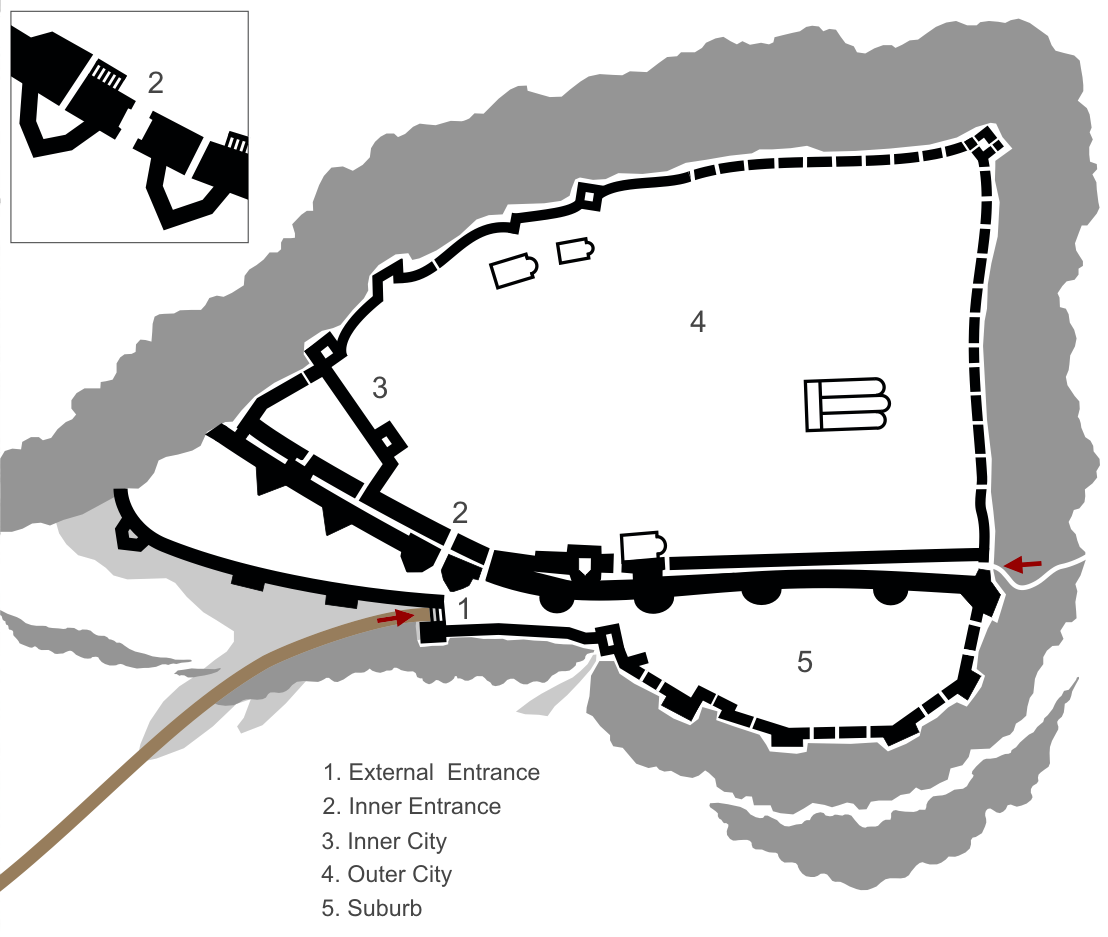
- Plan of the Shumen Fortress

Site information
- Type: Fortress
- Owner: Ancient Thrace, the Roman Empire, the Byzantine Empire, the Bulgarian Empire, and the Ottoman Empire.
- Open to the public: Yes
- Condition: Destroyed by the Ottomans, now partially restored

Location
- Location within Bulgaria
- Coordinates: 43.2622°N 26.8933°E

Site history
- Battles/wars: Many

The Shumen Fortress (Bulgarian: Шуменска крепост, Shumenska krepost) is an archaeological site overlooking the city of Shumen in north-eastern Bulgaria.

It is an ancient fortress with historical links to a village nearby traced to early Iron Age and later owned by the Thracians in the 5th century BC. Then, from 2nd to 4th centuries AD, it was controlled by the Romans who built towers and walls, and it was refurbished by the Byzantines as their garrison town. Shumen thrived in the Middle Ages as an important stronghold of the Bulgarian Empire. In 1444 the fort was destroyed by the Ottomans after their victory in the Battle of Varna over a Christian army under Władysław III of Poland. The fortress remained deserted ever since.

Restoration works on the fortress commenced in 2012 under the project titled “Bulgaria Begins Here”, and was completed partially in 2015 with financial assistance provided under the European Economic Area (EEA) and Norway Grants to the Shumen Municipality and the Shumen Regional Museum of History.

== Location ==
The fortress is built over a hill which gives a commanding view of the Shumen city. It is located at a distance of 5.5 kilometres (3.4 mi) from the Shumen city's Tombul Mosque. It is located within the Shumen Plateau Nature Park. From the entrance of the fortress, about 3 kilometres (1.9 mi) away is the "Creators of the Bulgarian State" Monument erected in 1981 during the communist regime to commemorate the 1300th anniversary of the Bulgarian state. An information center is 300 metres (980 ft) away from this monument and a 3 kilometres (1.9 mi) track from here leads to the fortress.

== History ==
The fortress represents a substantial part of the history of Bulgaria. The Ancient Bulgars, semi-nomadic warrior tribes of Turkic peoples, not to be confused with Turkish, arrived in what is in now north-eastern Bulgaria to the south of the Danube in the late 7th century AD and founded the First Bulgarian Empire. The fortress formed the town of Shumen during the First and Second Bulgarian Empire. During archaeological excavations, carried out since 1957, a village dating back to the Iron Age (around 4th century BC) of the First Empire was revealed. Thracians ruled over the territory from 5th to 2nd century BC, which was followed by Romans who ruled from first century BC to 3rd century AD, and then by the early Byzantine from 4th to 6th century AD.

During the First Bulgarian Empire the fortress was part of a system of fortifications providing for the defense of Pliska and Preslav, capital cities, and the religious centre of Madara. It then functioned as a minor fort during the 10th–12th centuries, as compared to the glory, economic prosperity and military might it had during the 4th–6th centuries. In the 13th century it again prospered as a political and economic entity of the reborn Bulgarian Empire. When the Byzantines temporarily took control of Preslav in 1278 during the Uprising of Ivaylo Shumen also acquired importance as an administrative and military centre. The fortress continued to thrive in the 14th century until the Ottoman Turks captured it in 1388 during a campaign of their first vizier Çandarlı Ali Pasha.

In 1444 King Władysław III of Poland (Varnenchik) (r. 1440–1444) of Polish-Hungarian descent attempted to drive the Ottomans out of Europe at the head of a large Christian army but was defeated and killed in the Battle of Varna. Following this battle the fortress was looted and gutted, and the Ottoman rulers eventually abandoned it completely.

== Description ==
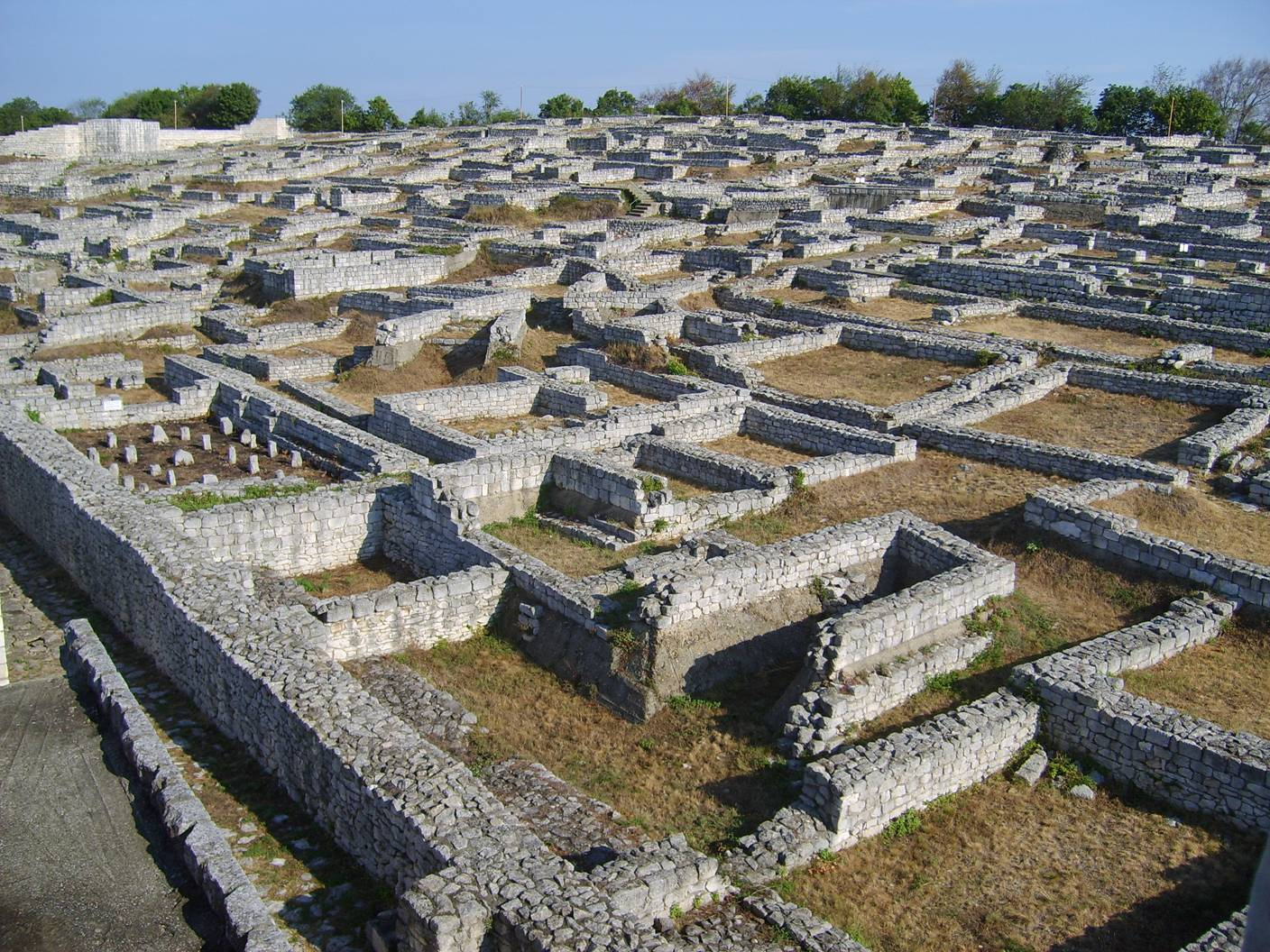
Restored features of the fortress.

The fortress was the best developed citadel during the 14th century. Archaeological excavations have been carried out since 1957 and many artefacts and structures have been unearthed. The ruined fort was partially restored during the period 2012–2015. At the foot of the fortress, monasteries and churches were found; some of which were reconstructed in the 1980s. The restoration works completed in 2015 covered walls of the fortress, creating tracks for walking around the fortress, and also building turnstiles. Other infrastructure created to encourage tourism are artistic lighting and equipment for temperature and humidity control, publicity brochures and overall management aspects.

Coins and seals from the site were studied. A particular circular seal cast in bronze with two headed eagle at the top has been identified as belonging to tsar John Alexander (r. 1331–1371). The image on the seal is stated to be a common feature of the 14th century seals, which were also made of gold and silver.

Another feature noted in the fortress was of a limestone projection which was carved on one side with a "double-headed eagle and a three-pointed crown seen between the heads of the birds." It was inferred that this marking was either made on the occasion of the visit of the ruler of Bulgaria to the fortress or may be a representation of the last emperor who ruled from Tarnovo, Ivan Shishman (r. 1371–1395). In the 1970 excavations to the south of Shumen Fortress, archaeologist Karel Škorpil unearthed the remnants of a church of 7.3 by 4.5 metres (24 ft × 15 ft) size. An inscription found on the wall of the fortress, dated to 13th century, relates to frequent terror attacks by Mongols.

== Restoration ==
The restoration of the fortress was initiated in 2012 under the project titled “Bulgaria Begins Here”. The works were completed partially in 2015 with financial assistance provided under the European Economic Area (EEA) and Norway Grants to the Shumen Municipality and the Shumen Regional Museum of History.

== Sources ==
- Baker, Mark; Deliso, Chris (2013). Lonely Planet Romania & Bulgaria. Lonely Planet. ISBN 978-1-74321-637-8.
- Cheynet, Jean-Claude; Sode, Claudia (2006). Studies in Byzantine Sigillography. Walter de Gruyter. ISBN 978-3-11-093821-0.
- Kassabova, Kapka (2008). Bulgaria. New Holland Publishers. ISBN 978-1-84537-564-5.
- Petkov, Kiril (2008). The Voices of Medieval Bulgaria, Seventh-Fifteenth Century: Records of a Bygone Culture. BRILL. ISBN 978-90-474-3375-0.
- Watkins, Richard; Deliso, Christopher (2008). Bulgaria. Ediz. Inglese. Lonely Planet. ISBN 978-1-74104-474-4.
- Fine, J. (1987). The Late Medieval Balkans, A Critical Survey from the Late Twelfth Century to the Ottoman Conquest. University of Michigan Press. ISBN 0-472-10079-3.
