= Okolia =

Former administrative-territorial unit of Bulgaria

Okolia (Bulgarian: Околия, plural: Околии) is a former administrative unit in Bulgaria established after the Tarnovo Constitution (Art. 3) adopted on 16 April 1879.

On 16 April 1879 in the old Bulgarian capital Veliko Tarnovo all 229 deputies in the Constituent Assembly signed the first Constitution of the Principality of Bulgaria which defined the administrative division of this country:

The territory is divided into administrative okrazhia, okolia and obshtina.

From 1885 to 1947 the okolia was the secondary administrative territorial unit after the primary unit (okrazhie, okrag, oblast). In 1947 during the People's Republic of Bulgaria the oblasts were closed and 102 okolias remained as the primary administrative territorial unit of which 7 were urban (Sofia, Plovdiv, Stara Zagora, Burgas, Varna, Ruse and Pleven). In 1959 the 117 okolias were abolished, and the People's Republic of Bulgaria was divided into 30 okrags.
