= Basil I of Bulgaria =

Patriarch of Bulgaria c. 1186 – c. 1232

Basil of Bulgaria
- Patriarch of Bulgaria
- Church: Bulgarian Orthodox Church
- Installed: c. 1186
- Term ended: c. 1232
- Predecessor: David of Bulgaria
- Successor: Joachim of Bulgaria

Personal details
- Denomination: Eastern Orthodox Church

Basil (Bulgarian: Василий I Български) was the first Patriarch of the Bulgarian Orthodox Church after restoring Tarnovo Patriarchate. Basil of Bulgaria crowned younger brother Asen I and consecrated the church "St. Demetrius" in Tarnovo.
