= Joachim II of Bulgaria =

Patriarch of Bulgaria from 1263 to 1272

- Patriarch of Bulgaria
- Church: Bulgarian Orthodox Church
- Installed: c. 1263
- Term ended: c. 1272
- Predecessor: Basil II
- Successor: Ignatius

Personal details
- Denomination: Eastern Orthodox Church

Joachim II (Bulgarian: Йоаким) was a Patriarch of the Bulgarian Orthodox Church in the mid 13th century. He is listed in the medieval Book of Boril as the third Patriarch presiding over the Bulgarian Church from Tarnovo, the capital of the Bulgarian Empire. Joachim II is also mentioned in a ktitor inscription in a rock monastery near the village of Troitsa on the territory of modern Shumen Plateau Nature Park. The church was consecrated in 1265 and was named after the Saints Nicholas and Andrew. Joachim II lead the Bulgarian Church during the reign of Emperor Konstantin Tih (r. 1257–1277).

== Sources ==
- Андреев (Andreev), Йордан (Jordan); Лазаров (Lazarov), Иван (Ivan); Павлов (Pavlov), Пламен (Plamen) (2012). Кой кой е в средновековна България [Who is Who in Medieval Bulgaria] (in Bulgarian). Изток Запад (Iztok Zapad). ISBN 978-619-152-012-1.

Titles of Chalcedonian Christianity
Preceded by Basil II	Patriarch of Bulgaria c. 1263–1272	Succeeded by Ignatius
