= Monument to 1300 Years of Bulgaria, Shumen =

Monument in Shumen, Bulgaria

Founders of the Bulgarian State Monument
- Създатели на българската държава
- Interactive map of Founders of the Bulgarian State Monument
- Location: Shumen, Bulgaria
- Coordinates: 43°15′45″N 26°55′20″E
- Designer: Krum Damyanov; Ivan Slavov
- Type: Architecture Complex
- Material: concrete, steel, glass
- Height: 52 metres (171 ft)
- Beginning date: 1979
- Completion date: 1981
- Opening date: 28 November 1981

The Monument to 1300 Years of Bulgaria (Bulgarian: Паметник 1300 години България), also known as the Founders of the Bulgarian State Monument (Паметник на създателите на Българската държава), is a large monument built on a plateau above the city of Shumen, Bulgaria. It was built in 1981 to commemorate the 1300th anniversary of the First Bulgarian Empire.

The monument is built in concrete in a Cubist style, and was designed by Bulgarian sculptors Krum Damyanov and Ivan Slavov. It is reached by a processional concrete stairway from Shumen, or by road. It stands at a height of 450 m above sea level and can be seen from 30 km away.

The monument was featured on the cover of Daniel Caesar's 2017 debut album Freudian.

== Gallery ==
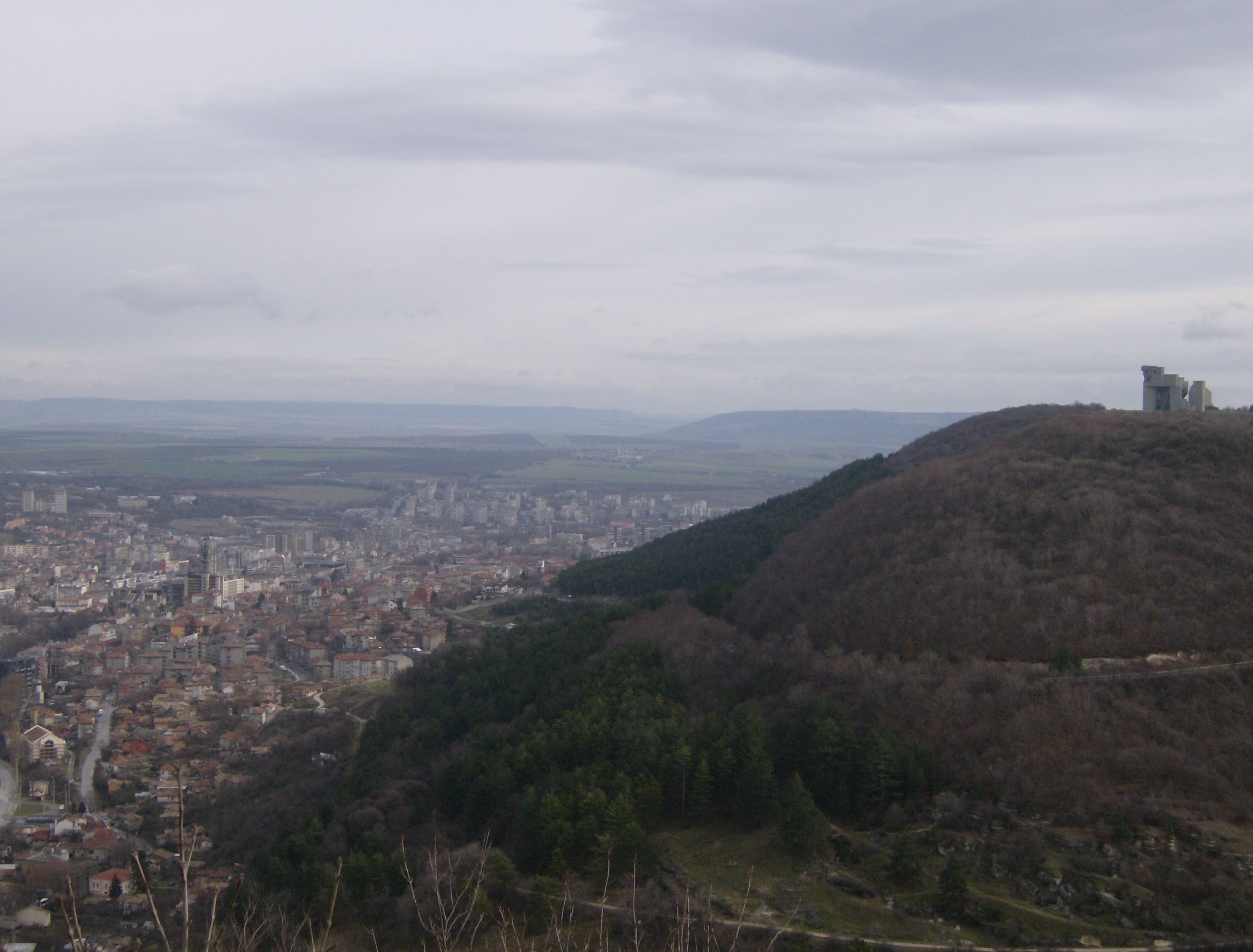
View to the monument
