= Joachim I of Bulgaria =

Patriarch of Bulgaria from 1235 to 1246

Saint Joachim I of Bulgaria
- Patriarch of Bulgaria
- Church: Bulgarian Orthodox Church
- Installed: 1234
- Term ended: 1246
- Predecessor: Basil I
- Successor: Basil II

Personal details
- Died: 18 January 1246
- Denomination: Eastern Orthodox Church

Joachim I (Bulgarian: Йоаким I) was the Patriarch of the Bulgarian Orthodox Church between 1235 and 1246. He was the first head of the restored Bulgarian Patriarchate with seat in Tarnovo, the capital of the Second Bulgarian Empire. Joachim I died of natural death on 18 January 1246 and was proclaimed a saint. He was the founder of an extensive monastic complex known as the Rock-hewn Churches of Ivanovo, now included in the UNESCO World Heritage List.

== Early life ==
Joachim dedicated himself to religion in his youth when he "comprehended the deceit of the world". He went to Mount Athos where he established himself in one of the numerous monasteries there. Joachim spent his time in continuous prayer, fast and vigil. Being an exemplary ascetic, he became known among the monastic community with his deeds and diligence.

After spending many years in Athos Joachim returned in Bulgaria and settled with three disciples near the village of Krasen, not far from the Danube river. There they carved a small rock church in the gorges of the Rusenski Lom river. His fame spread in the country and reached emperor Ivan Asen II (r. 1218–1241), who went to a pilgrimage to Joachim's abode. The two men established very close spiritual relationship. Ivan Asen II donated a lot of gold to the ascetic who ordered the construction of the Church of Archangel Michael, now called the "Buried Church" that forms part of the Rock-hewn Churches of Ivanovo. The church became the centre of a monastery that gathered many monks.

== Patriarch ==
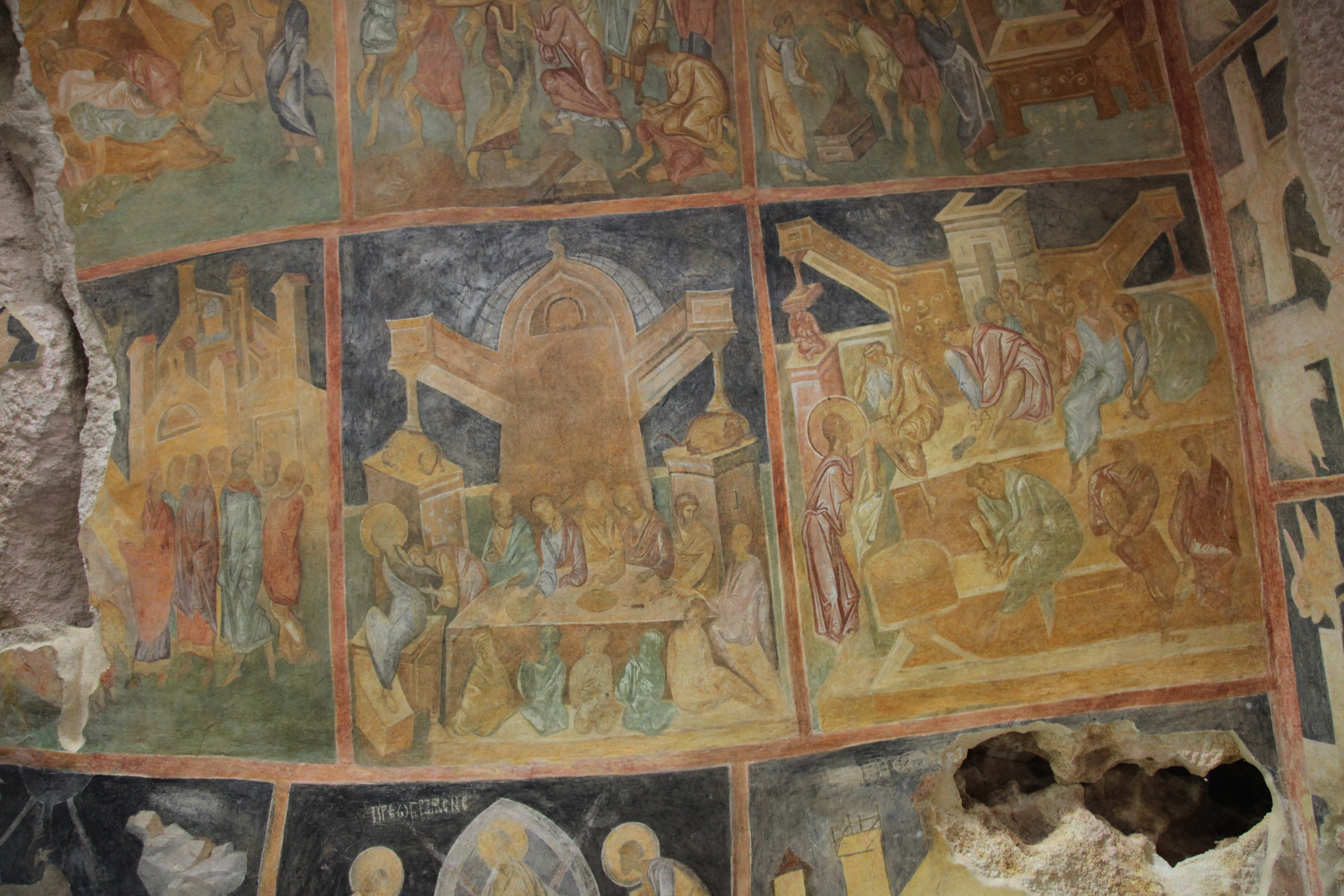
Frescoes in the Rock-hewn Churches of Ivanovo, founded by Patriarch Joachim I

In 1234 the Bulgarian Archbishop Basil I relinquished the post and retired to a monastery. At the instigation of Ivan Asen II Joachim succeeded Basil as archbishop. At that time Ivan Asen II discontinued the formal union between the Bulgarian Church and the Papacy in Rome, established in 1205 by his uncle Kaloyan and Pope Innocent III. In 1235 the Bulgarian Emperor met with the Nicaean Emperor John Doukas Vatatzes to conclude an alliance and secure the restoration of the Bulgarian Patriarchate, first acknowledged in 927. On a church council held in the town of Lampsacus in Asia Minor the Ecumenical Patriarch of Constantinople (at the time in exile) Germanus II confirmed Joachim I as Patriarch of Bulgaria. The decision was validated by all Eastern Patriarchs.

Joachim I presided over the Church in a period of cultural and economic apogee of the Bulgarian state and "enlightened the whole Bulgarian land". He dedicated much of his time to his pastoral duties – taking care of orphans and the poor and "saving many from the emperor's anger". His hagiography notes that Joachim I had saved numerous people from capital punishment. After the demise of Ivan Asen II in 1241 Joachim I became the regent of the infant Kaliman I Asen (r. 1241–1246).

Patriarch Joachim I died peacefully on 18 January 1246. Soon after his death he was proclaimed a saint and a dedicated hagiography was written for his deeds. Joachim I was remembered as a "pious and saintly man", "celebrated for his poetic deeds" and revered as the "first Patriarch of the God-protected Imperial city of Tarnovo".

== Sources ==
- Андреев (Andreev), Йордан (Jordan); Лалков (Lalkov), Милчо (Milcho) (1996). Българските ханове и царе (The Bulgarian Khans and Tsars) (in Bulgarian). Велико Търново (Veliko Tarnovo): Абагар (Abagar). ISBN 954-427-216-X.
- Андреев (Andreev), Йордан (Jordan); Лазаров (Lazarov), Иван (Ivan); Павлов (Pavlov), Пламен (Plamen) (2012). Кой кой е в средновековна България [Who is Who in Medieval Bulgaria] (in Bulgarian). Изток Запад (Iztok Zapad). ISBN 978-619-152-012-1.
- Златарски (Zlatarski), Васил (Vasil) (1972) [1940]. История на българската държава през Средните векове. Том III. Второ българско царство. България при Асеневци (1185–1280). (History of the Bulgarian state in the Middle Ages. Volume III. Second Bulgarian Empire. Bulgaria under the Asen Dynasty (1185–1280)) (in Bulgarian) (2 ed.). София (Sofia): Наука и изкуство (Nauka i izkustvo).

Titles of Chalcedonian Christianity
Preceded by Basil I as Archbishop of Bulgaria	Patriarch of Bulgaria c. 1234–1246	Succeeded by Basil II
