= Basil II of Bulgaria =

Patriarch of Bulgaria from 1246 to 1263

- Patriarch of Bulgaria
- Church: Bulgarian Orthodox Church
- Installed: c. 1246
- Term ended: c. 1263
- Predecessor: Joachim I
- Successor: Joachim II

Personal details
- Denomination: Eastern Orthodox Church

Basil II (Bulgarian: Василий) was a Patriarch of the Bulgarian Orthodox Church in the mid 13th century. His name is known only from the medieval Book of Boril where he is listed as the second Patriarch presiding over the Bulgarian Church from Tarnovo, the capital of the Bulgarian Empire. Basil II lead the Church in a period of crisis for the Bulgarian state after the demise of the successful Emperor Ivan Asen II (r. 1218–1241).

== Sources ==
- Андреев (Andreev), Йордан (Jordan); Лазаров (Lazarov), Иван (Ivan); Павлов (Pavlov), Пламен (Plamen) (2012). Кой кой е в средновековна България [Who is Who in Medieval Bulgaria] (in Bulgarian). Изток Запад (Iztok Zapad). ISBN 978-619-152-012-1.

Titles of Chalcedonian Christianity
Preceded by Joachim I	Patriarch of Bulgaria c. 1246–1263	Succeeded by Joachim II
