= Council against Bogomilism =

Council against Bogomilism may refer to any one of the three medieval councils that addressed Bogomilism, a heretic Christian sect:

- First Anti-Bogomil Council organized by Alexios I Komnenos in 1110
- Nemanja's Council against Bogomilism (around 1176)
- Synod of Tarnovo (1211)
