= Treatise Against the Bogomils =

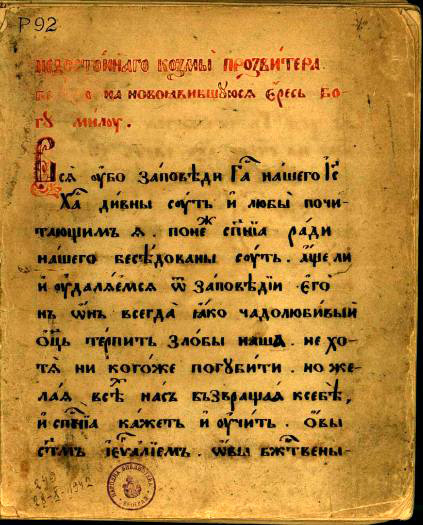
A page from Cosmas the Priest's Sermon Against the Heretics (from National Library of Serbia)

Sermon Against the Heresy (Church Slavonic: Бесѣда на ересь, romanized: Besěda na eresǐ) is a polemical and didactic work of Old Bulgarian literature, written by Cosmas the Priest, a church writer close to Tsar Peter I of Bulgaria. Sermon bears the full title Homily of the Unworthy Presbyter Cosmas Against the Newly-Appeared Bogomil Heresy (недостоинаѥго коꙁмꙑ преꙁвѵтера бесѣда на новоꙗвивъшѫѭ сѧ ересь богоумилоу nedostoinajego kozmy prezvütera besěda na novojavivŭšǫjǫ sę eresĭ bogumilu), or, in other manuscripts, Sermon of Saint Cosmas Presbyter Against the Heretics, A Discussion and an Instruction from the Books of God.

The treatise is recognised as the earliest and most complete work to tell of the nature of Bogomilism, its origins and its dualistic doctrine. As Catharism originated from Bogomilism, Sermon Against the Heretics is valuable as an insight into Catharism's Balkan predecessor. It is also an important source on life and society in 10th-century Bulgaria, which is described as suffering a major crisis, the glorious days of Peter's father Simeon the Great (r. 893–927) long over.

== Manuscripts ==
It has been preserved in 25 full copies, all from East Slavic sources, and 116 excerpts or compilations, some of which are of South Slavic origin. The earliest of the extant copies was made in the 15th century. As attested by the large number of copies, Cosmas' work was particularly popular in medieval Russia and Serbia. There, it was even used as a basis for writings against other heresies.

== Content ==
оучѧтъ же своꙗ си не повиновати сѧ властелемъ своимъ; хоулѧще богатꙑѩ, царь ненавидѧтъ, рѫгаѭтъ сѧ старѣишинамъ, оукарꙗѭтъ болꙗрꙑ, мрьзькꙑ богоу мьнѧтъ работаѭщѧѩ цѣсарю, и вьсꙗкомоу рабоу не велѧтъ работати господиноу своѥмоу.

učętǔ že svoja si ne povinovati sę vlastelemǔ svoimǔ; xulęšte bogatyję, carǐ nenavidętǔ, rǫgajǫtǔ sę starěišinamǔm, ukarjajǫtǔ boljary, mrǐzǐky bogu mǐnętǔ rabotajǫštęję cěsarju, i vǐsjakomu rabu ne velętǐ rabotati gospodinu svojemu.

They teach their followers not to obey their masters; they scorn the rich, they hate the Tsars, they ridicule their superiors, they reproach the boyars, they believe that God looks in horror on those who labour for the Tsar, and advise every serf not to work for his master.

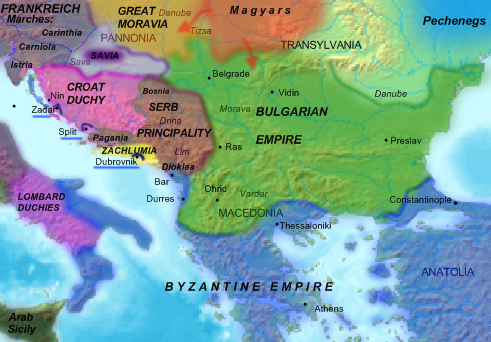
Bulgaria around 950 AD.

Sermon Against the Heretics is divided into two sections, which may be seen as separate works due to their somewhat different topics. The first part presents details about various aspects of the Bogomil heresy and identifies a certain priest named Bogomil as its founder (though, Cosmas claims, it was actually an act of the devil himself). The first section of the treatise is a vehement criticism of Bogomilism and its disobedient followers, whom Cosmas accuses of contributing to the degradation of Bulgarian society. As Cosmas purposefully employed around 70 quotations from Apostle Paul to debunk the beliefs of Bogomils, he was very likely aware of the sect's ancestral ties to Paulicianism.

The second part of the treatise contains Cosmas' criticism on contemporary Bulgarian society, with particular attention to the religious and social issues of the time. While Cosmas was a staunch supporter of the Bulgarian Orthodox Church's policies against Bogomilism, in the second section he spares no criticism to that religious body's other practices. Cosmas accuses the Bulgarian abbots and bishops of greed, gluttony and neglect towards the congregation. He is also critical of hermits, whose popularity and influence at the time Cosmas saw as inappropriate. Cosmas hints that the emergence of Bogomilism should be blamed at least partially on the contemporary state of the Bulgarian Orthodox Church.

== See also ==
- Cosmas the Priest
- Bogomil (priest)
- Bogomilism

== Sources ==
- Curta, Florin (2006). Southeastern Europe in the Middle Ages, 500–1250. Cambridge: Cambridge University Press. ISBN 978-0-521-81539-0.
- Eteriano, Hugh; Janet Hamilton; Sarah Hamilton; Bernard Hamilton (2004). Contra Patarenos. BRILL. ISBN 978-90-04-14000-4.
- Kazhdan, Alexander (1991). Oxford Dictionary of Byzantium. Oxford University Press. ISBN 978-0-19-504652-6.
- Loos, Milan (1974). Dualist heresy in the Middle Ages. Vol. 10. Springer. ISBN 978-90-247-1673-9.
- Obolensky, Dimitri (2004). The Bogomils: A Study in Balkan Neo-Manichaeism. Cambridge: Cambridge University Press. ISBN 978-0-521-60763-6.
- Peters, Edward (1980). Heresy and authority in medieval Europe: documents in translation. University of Pennsylvania Press. ISBN 978-0-8122-1103-0.
- Sampimon, Janette; Sara van Halsema (2005). "Cosmas Presbyter. Homily Against the Bogumils. Operational Edition" (PDF). Ohio State University. Archived from the original (PDF) on 15 July 2007.
- Strayer, Joseph Reese (1992). The Albigensian Crusades. University of Michigan Press. ISBN 978-0-472-06476-2.
- Андреев, Йордан; Лазаров, Иван; Павлов, Пламен (1999). Кой кой е в средновековна България [Who is Who in Medieval Bulgaria] (in Bulgarian). Петър Берон. ISBN 978-954-402-047-7.
