= Balbissa =

Ancient town in Cappadocia, now modern Turkey

Coordinates: 38°06′06″N 34°36′13″E

Balbissa was a town of ancient Cappadocia still inhabited in Byzantine times. The name Balbissa does not occur in ancient authors but is inferred from epigraphic and other evidence.

A bishop of Balbissa, Leontius was accused of Bogomilism and tried before the synod in Constantinople in 1143.

Its site is located near Yaylaköy, Asiatic Turkey.
