= Book of John (disambiguation) =

Book of John refers to the Gospel of John.

Book of John may also refer to:

- First Epistle of John
- Second Epistle of John
- Third Epistle of John
- Book of Revelation
- Mandaean Book of John, a Mandaean text
- Secret Book of John, a Gnostic text
- Book of the Secret Supper, or "Book of John the Evangelist", a Bogomil text
