= Nemanja's Council against Bogomilism =

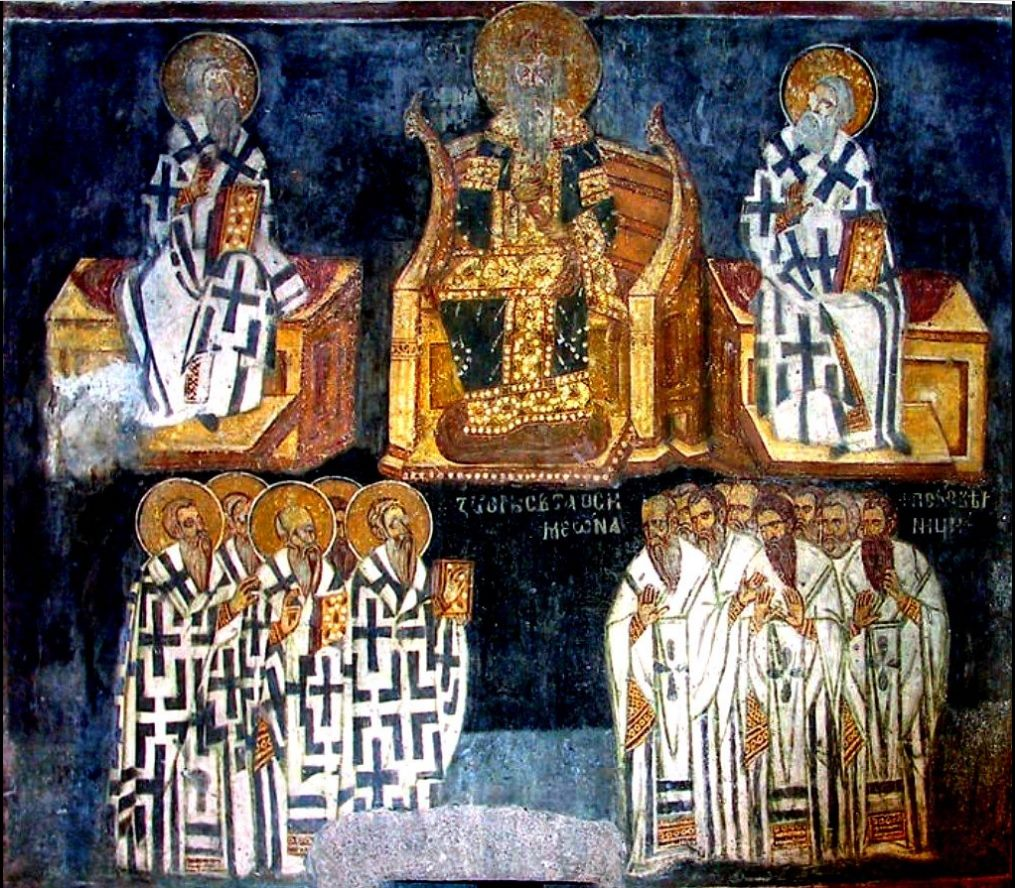
Fresco from the Church of St. Achillius, Arilje from 1290s, believed to depict the Council against Bogomils. Stefan Nemanja is depicted in the top middle, presiding over the council. The lower left portion depicts Orthodox clergy, while lower right portion depicts "half-believers" (ПОЛОВѢРNНЦН) believed to be Bogomils. Note that Bogomils did not actually attend the council.

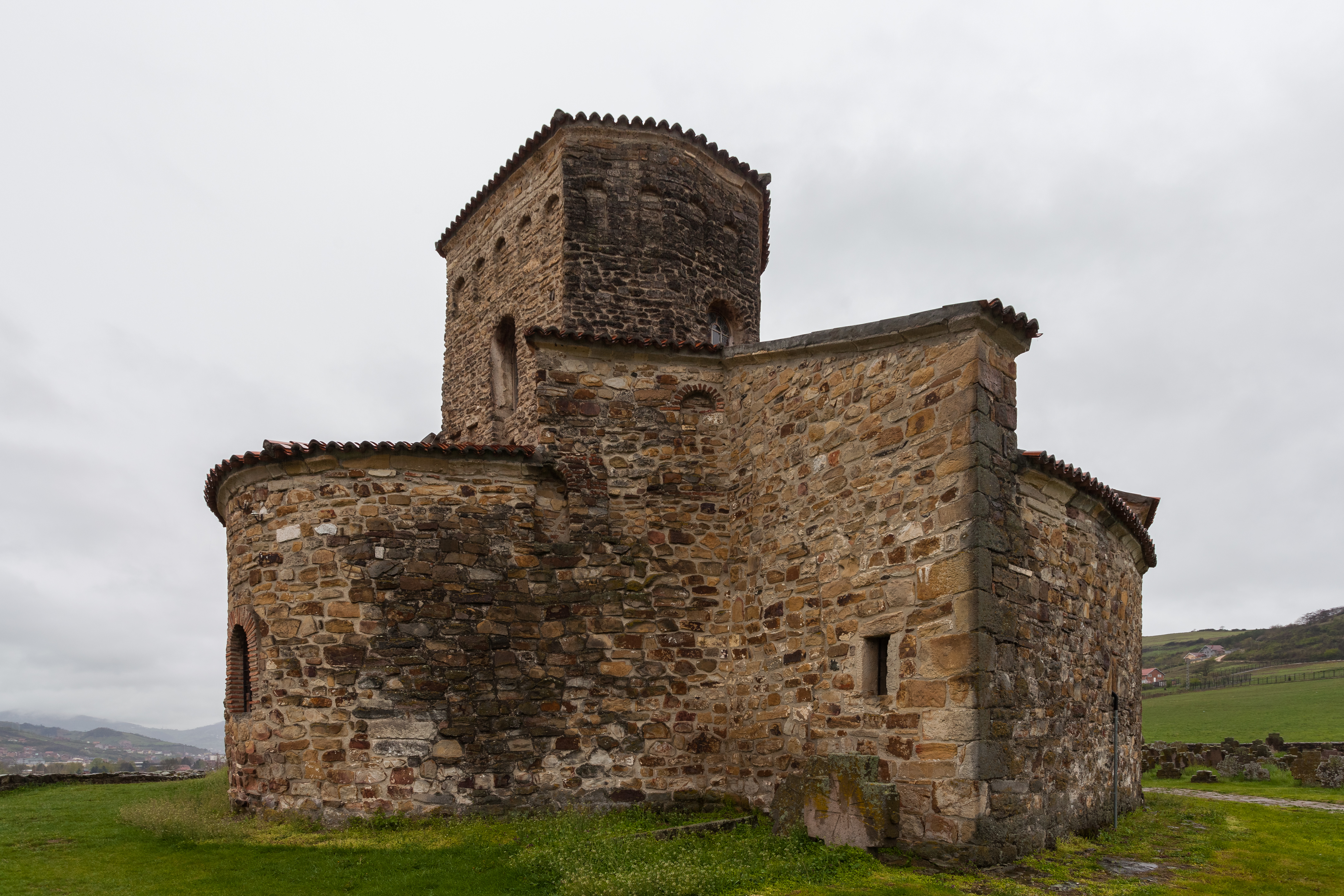
Church of the Holy Apostles Peter and Paul, a place where the council was held.

Church-State Council against Bogomilism (Serbian: Црквено-државни сабор против богумила, romanized: Crkveno-državni sabor protiv bogumila) was convened around 1176 by the Grand Župan Stefan Nemanja in front of the old Church of the Holy Apostles Peter and Paul in Ras, Grand Principality of Serbia. The council was attended by the Orthodox clergy and important noblemen of Rascia. The council addressed the problem of Bogomilism, a dualist Christian sect that had spread in Serbia and was perceived as a threat by Nemanja. The Bogomils themselves did not attend the Council. The only contemporary source about the Council is Nemanja's biography written by his son Stefan the First-Crowned. The exact date of the council is not known, but it must have been between 1173 and 1180.

The Council was presided by Nemanja and discussed Bogomilism and its teachings. Various witnesses were called to testify before the council. Nemanja claimed that Bogomils presented a grave danger to national and religious unity. One group of attendants showed opposition to such views, as some of the noblemen were sympathetic to Bogomilism. Nemanja tried to sway their opinion in his favor by calling a witness - a daughter of one of his close associates, who was previously married to a Bogomil. She testified that Bogomils "do not respect God the creator and Virgin Mary, [...] but they worship and respect [...] Satan." This was partly true as Bogomils believed Satan to be God's elder son. This testimony indeed had great impact on the attendants and helped Nemanja's position. After some debating, it was agreed to condemn Bogomilism as a heresy that needs to be eradicated, and also to deploy the army in the areas where Bogomils were present. Bogomils were not condemned to death automatically, but were ordered to either renounce their faith or leave the country. Their books were ordered to be burned. According to Nemanja's biography, even mentioning Bogomils' name was forbidden, and Nemanja ordered their leader's tongue to be cut off, although leader's name is not mentioned. Period of persecution ensued, and many Bogomil religious elders were burned at stake, while many believers were punished with various corporal punishments and expelled from Serbia, with all their property confiscated. Those Bogomils who escaped, mostly found refuge in Bosnia.

Nemanja's anti-Bogomil council followed a similar council organized by Byzantine Emperor Alexios I Komnenos in 1110, and preceded another anti-Bogomil council organized by Bulgarian Emperor Boril in 1211.
