= Constantine Chrysomalus =

Byzantine monk

Constantine Chrysomalus (or Constantine Chrysomallus; Greek: Κωνσταντῖνος Χρυσόμαλλος) was a Byzantine monk who was posthumously condemned by a Synod of Constantinople as a teacher of heresies affiliated with Bogomilism and Messalianism. Although Chrysomalus and his writings, the Golden Sermons, had been accused of promoting Bogomil teachings, his association with Bogomilism has been contested by later scholars.

== Condemnation ==
At the time of his condemnation, Chrysomalus' works had attained great popularity in the monastery of St. Nicholas in Hieron (likely a naval base on the Bosphoros), where he had only recently died. The posthumous trial was held at the church of St. Alexius in Constantinople in May 1140 under the authority of the patriarch Leo Styppeiotes, and the record of the trial still exists. Dimitri Obolensky lists the heretical doctrines that the Synod attributed to Chrysomalus:

"[That] baptism, the confession of sins, the study of the Gospels, the singing of psalms, [and] attending church services are of no avail until the Christian has received, through initiation, the gift of perceiving intellectually the Holy Spirit; those who have reached that stage are no longer subject to the law, have escaped the power of Satan and are incapable of sin; in every Christian there dwell two souls, the one sinless, the other sinful..."

The Synod claimed that Chrysomalus' replacement of the baptism with his own initiatory rite and the concept of two souls were signs of Bogomilism. This is disputed by Obolensky, who notes that the former was not exclusive to Bogomilism and that latter was generally associated elsewhere with Messalianism (a heresy also mentioned by the Synod).

Also attributed to Chrysomalus were teachings associated with civil disobedience: that the reverence of worldly rulers is akin to paying homage to Satan and that temporal authority should be denounced. Although this is similar to some practices attributed to the Bogomils by Cosmas the Priest, it is not possible to establish a definite connection.
