= On the Priesthood of Jesus =

Filelfo's 1476 Latin translation

On the Priesthood of Jesus, also known as the Confession of Theodosius or Apology of Theodosius, is a Christian apocryphon that claims that Jesus was one of the priests of the Second Temple. It is considered an "embedded apocryphon" because the apostolic or eyewitness testimony is embedded within a frame story set much later. That story refers to a codex kept hidden by the Jews which shows that Jesus was vetted by the temple priests, who concluded that he was a Levite (through his mother), the Son of God and born of a virgin. On the Priesthood thus offers a defence of the Virgin Birth as well as a novel claim of Jesus' having been a levitical priest. On account of its interest in Jesus' origins, it may be classed with the infancy gospels.

Probably composed in the 7th or 8th century, On the Priesthood of Jesus is not an orthodox Christian work. It contradicts the canonical Epistle to the Hebrews regarding Jesus' ancestry and priesthood.

== Synopsis ==
During the reign of Justinian I (527–565), a Christian moneychanger named Philip is trying to convert his Jewish friend Theodosius. After confessing that Jesus is the Messiah, Theodosius refuses to be baptized and relinquish the benefits of belonging to the Jewish community. He relates to Philip that in the Second Temple there were traditionally 22 priests at any time, each holding his position for life and his successor being elected by the rest. Once, when there was a vacancy, Jesus was put forward as a possible replacement. He was living in Judaea at the time but had not yet begun his ministry. When the priests summoned Mary to confirm the names of Jesus' parents, she told them that she had always been a virgin and that Jesus had no earthly father. Some midwives investigated and confirmed her claim, so Jesus' parents were entered into the register of priests as Mary and the living God.

According to Theodosius, the register escaped the destruction of Jerusalem in AD 70 and was hidden in Tiberias. Philip wishes to inform the emperor so that the codex can be recovered, but Theodosius warns that only bloodshed could result. The narrator then cites Josephus and Luke to buttress the claims of Theodosius that Jesus was a priest of the temple.

== Date and authorship ==
In its final form, On the Priesthood must have been written after the reign of Justinian I, whom the narrator indicates has died. The embedded story itself contains anachronisms, such as the use of dating by the indiction (introduced by Constantine I in the 4th century). The reference to conflict if the emperor should attempt to retrieve the codex may indicate that the narrator was writing after the Arab conquest of Palestine in the 630s. The earliest reference to On the Priesthood is found in John of Euboea's Sermon on the Conception of the Mother of God from the mid-8th century. Thus, the most likely period for the text's composition is the 7th–8th century.

The anonymous author or forger is generally seen as a Jewish Christian.

== Transmission ==
On the Priesthood was originally written in Greek. It was transmitted as an independent text in both a long and a short recension. The long recension, known from only three manuscripts, is probably older. More manuscripts of the short recension are known. By the 12th century, an even shorter version of the text had been incorporated into the Suda, a Greek encyclopedia, as its entry for "Jesus". The Suda entry was also excerpted and circulated independently. There are also several heavily abridged versions, including one that lacks the frame story entirely.

During the Middle Ages, On the Priesthood was translated into Arabic, Georgian, Latin and Slavonic. The Arabic translation, which is incorporated into the History of the Patriarchs of the Coptic Church of Alexandria, and the Georgian are both based on the long Greek recension. According to the prologue of the History, the Arabic was translated from Coptic. Four Slavonic versions exist, two based on the short recension, an abridgement of the Suda's version and a version found in the Historia de ligno crucis. The version in the Historia is textually independent. It changes the number of priests to 40 and seems to have influenced the Slavonic translation of John of Euboea's Sermon.

At least six different Latin translations are known, all derived from the Suda entry, the earliest by Robert Grosseteste in the 13th century. The five others were all made in the 15th century: one by Lauro Quirini (dedicated to Pope Nicholas V in 1452, later anonymously revised), two by Francesco Filelfo (dedicated to Pope Sixtus IV in 1474 and 1476), one by Ambrogio Traversari (printed in 1496) and one by an anonymous translator (sent by Jacopo Marcello to King René in 1452, printed 1541). The Latin version of Grosseteste was translated into Anglo-Norman French before the end of the 13th century.

== Reception ==
On the Priesthood was controversial in Christian circles. In the 12th century, Michael Glycas critiqued it as inconsistent with the canonical presentation of Jesus in the gospels and Hebrews, while acknowledging its popularity. According to a note found in some manuscripts of the Suda, John Chrysostom "does not at all accept this priesthood attributed to Christ."

Some Christians made use of the text as a valid source of information. John of Euboea's Sermon cites it in support of Mary's purity. Neophytos of Cyprus sought to reconcile it with the theology of Hebrews and cited it in support of Eastern eucharistic theology.

The appearance of several Latin translations in the 15th century attests to the great interest of the Renaissance humanists in Greek texts little known in the West. In their dedicatory letters, Filelfo and Quirini note that the pope will be better placed than themselves to assess the reliability of the story. The popularity of the story declined with the advent of the Reformation. Johannes Hentenius wrote a refutation that was published alongside the anonymous Latin translation in 1543.

== Bibliography ==
- Adler, William (2016a). "On the Priesthood of Jesus: A New Translation and Introduction". In Tony Burke; Brent Landau (eds.). New Testament Apocrypha: More Noncanonical Scriptures. Vol. 1. William B. Eerdmans Publishing Company. pp. 69–108.
- Adler, William (2016b). "On the Priesthood of Jesus". e-Clavis: Christian Apocrypha. North American Society for the Study of Christian Apocryphal Literature.
- Dean, Ruth J. (1936). "An Anglo-Norman Version of Grosseteste: Part of his Suidas and Testamenta XII patriarcharum". Publications of the Modern Language Association of America. 51 (3): 607–620. JSTOR 458257.
- De Keyser, Jeroen (2013). "Early Modern Latin Translations of the Apocryphal De Sacerdotio Christi". Lias: Journal of Early Modern Intellectual Culture and Its Sources. 40 (1): 29–82. doi:10.2143/LIAS.40.1.2998083.
- Thomson, Francis J. (1985). "Apocrypha Slavica: II". The Slavonic and East European Review. 63 (1): 73–98. JSTOR 4209033.
