= Tale of the Cross Tree =

Christian legend at least 1000 years old

The Tale of the Cross Tree, known conventionally in Latin as Historia de ligno crucis, is an Old Slavonic compilation of legends mostly about the wood of the True Cross and its veneration. Although the legends are often found in other written sources, the text of the Historia is always unique and original. It has not been established whether it is an original work in Slavonic, depending in part on oral legends, or a translation from Greek; nor whether it was compiled by the author/translator or by a compiler working with several preexisting texts. The Historia was circulating in manuscript as early as the 13th century.

In the Russian manuscript tradition, the Historia is attributed to a certain Jeremiah, who is usually identified as the Bulgarian priest Jeremiah, one of the founders of Bogomilism in the 10th century. This identification is not universally accepted. An Old Serbian redaction of the Historia is known from the 13th-century Miscellany of Dragol. Several excerpts of the Historia have been published by Aurelio de Santos Otero.

The centrepiece of the compilation is a version of the wood-of-the-cross legend. According to the Historia, Moses, instructed by an angel, braids together cedar, cypress and pine and plants them in the bitter waters of Marah to make them sweet. The angel tells Moses that the woods symbolize the Trinity and will become the tree of salvation, the tree of life and the tree of peace. On its wood the Lord himself will be killed. On the tree, Moses later displays the brazen serpent.

Among the legends in the Historia unrelated to the cross are a version of the apocryphal On the Priesthood of Jesus, the forged correspondence of Jesus with King Abgar V and a story about Jesus ploughing. The Historia's version of On the Priesthood claims that the number of priests in the Second Temple was forty (where the original has twenty-two). Versions of the correspondence derived from the Historia circulated independently in the 14th–15th centuries.

== Works cited ==
- Fallon, Nicole (2009). The Cross as Tree: The Wood-of-the-Cross Legends in Middle English and Latin Texts in Medieval England (PhD dissertation). University of Toronto.
- Minczew, Georgi (2006). "Critical Study: The Old Slavic Apocrypha in Serbian Translation". Apocrypha. 17: 245–253.
- Popovich, Thomas S. (1994). Jeremija the Presbyter and His Role in Medieval Slavic Literature (PhD dissertation). Columbia University. OCLC 34755069. ProQuest 9421390
- Thomson, Francis J. (1980). "Apocrypha Slavica". The Slavonic and East European Review. 58 (2): 256–268. JSTOR 4208031.
- Thomson, Francis J. (1985). "Apocrypha Slavica: II". The Slavonic and East European Review. 63 (1): 73–98. JSTOR 4209033.
