= Boril of Bulgaria =

Emperor of Bulgaria from 1207 to 1218

Boril Борил
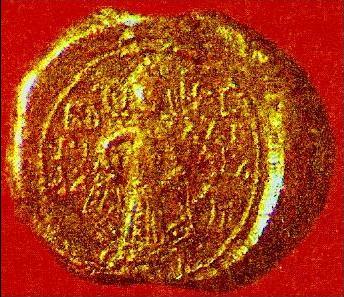
- Golden seal of Boril

Tsar of Bulgaria
- Reign: 1207–1218
- Predecessor: Kaloyan
- Successor: Ivan Asen II
- Spouse: Cuman princess Elisabeth of Courtenay
- House: Asen dynasty

Boril (Bulgarian: Борил) was the emperor (tsar) of Bulgaria from 1207 to 1218. He was the son of an unnamed sister of his predecessor, Kaloyan and Kaloyan's brothers, Peter II and Ivan Asen I, who had restored the independent Bulgarian state. After Kaloyan died unexpectedly in October 1207, Boril married his widow, a Cuman princess and seized the throne. His cousin, Ivan Asen, fled from Bulgaria, enabling Boril to strengthen his position. His other kinsmen, Strez and Alexius Slav, refused to acknowledge him as the lawful monarch. Strez took possession of the land between the Struma and Vardar rivers with the support of Stefan Nemanjić of Serbia. Alexius Slav secured his rule in the Rhodope Mountains with the assistance of Henry, the Latin Emperor of Constantinople.

Boril launched unsuccessful military campaigns against the Latin Empire and the Kingdom of Thessalonica during the first years of his reign. He convoked the synod of the Bulgarian Church in early 1211. At the assembly, the bishops condemned the Bogomils for heresy. After an uprising broke out against him in Vidin between 1211 and 1214, he sought the assistance of Andrew II of Hungary, who sent reinforcements to suppress the rebellion. He made peace with the Latin Empire in late 1213 or early 1214. After Henry died in 1216 and Andrew II left Hungary for a crusade, Ivan Asen returned to Bulgaria. He captured and blinded Boril in Tarnovo in 1218.

== Early life ==
Boril was the son of a sister of three emperors (or tsars) of restored Bulgarian Empire, Peter II, Ivan Asen I and Kaloyan. The etymology of his name is uncertain: it may be connected either to the Slavic verb boriti ("to fight") or to the Turkic noun böri ("wolf"). Historian Alexandru Madgearu says most recorded variants of the name (Borilǔ, Burile, Borilus, Burillus) suggest that "it was pronounced Borilǎ, as in Romanian".

== Reign ==
=== Rise to the throne ===
Kaloyan died suddenly while besieging Thessaloniki in October 1207. Rumours began to spread claiming that he was killed by the patron saint of the besieged town, Demetrius. A version of these stories claims that the saint persuaded one Manastras to kill the tsar. The Latin Emperor of Constantinople, Henry, stated in one of his letters that Boril "had imposed his will by violence and usurped the imperial name and insignia". Henri de Valenciennes (who continued the chronicle of Geoffrey of Villehardouin after 1207) likewise described Boril as a renegade who unlawfully seized the imperial crown. According to Madgearu, both reports suggest that Boril had his uncle murdered, most likely in cooperation with Kaloyan's wife. Historian John V. A. Fine, however, emphasises that "there is no evidence against Boril".

Boril married Kaloyan's widow either to strengthen his claim to the throne, or to secure the Cumans' support. However, many noblemen (among them members of his family) always regarded him as a usurper. Ivan Asen's underage son of the same name soon fled to the Cumans and later to the "lands of the Russians" (that is to Galicia or Kiev). Boril's brother, Strez, sought refuge in Serbia. Instead of extraditing him, Stefan Nemanjić of Serbia granted him the fortress of Prosek. A third relative, Alexius Slav, took possession of the region of the Rhodope Mountains, which surrounded his castle at Tsepina.

=== War with the Latins ===
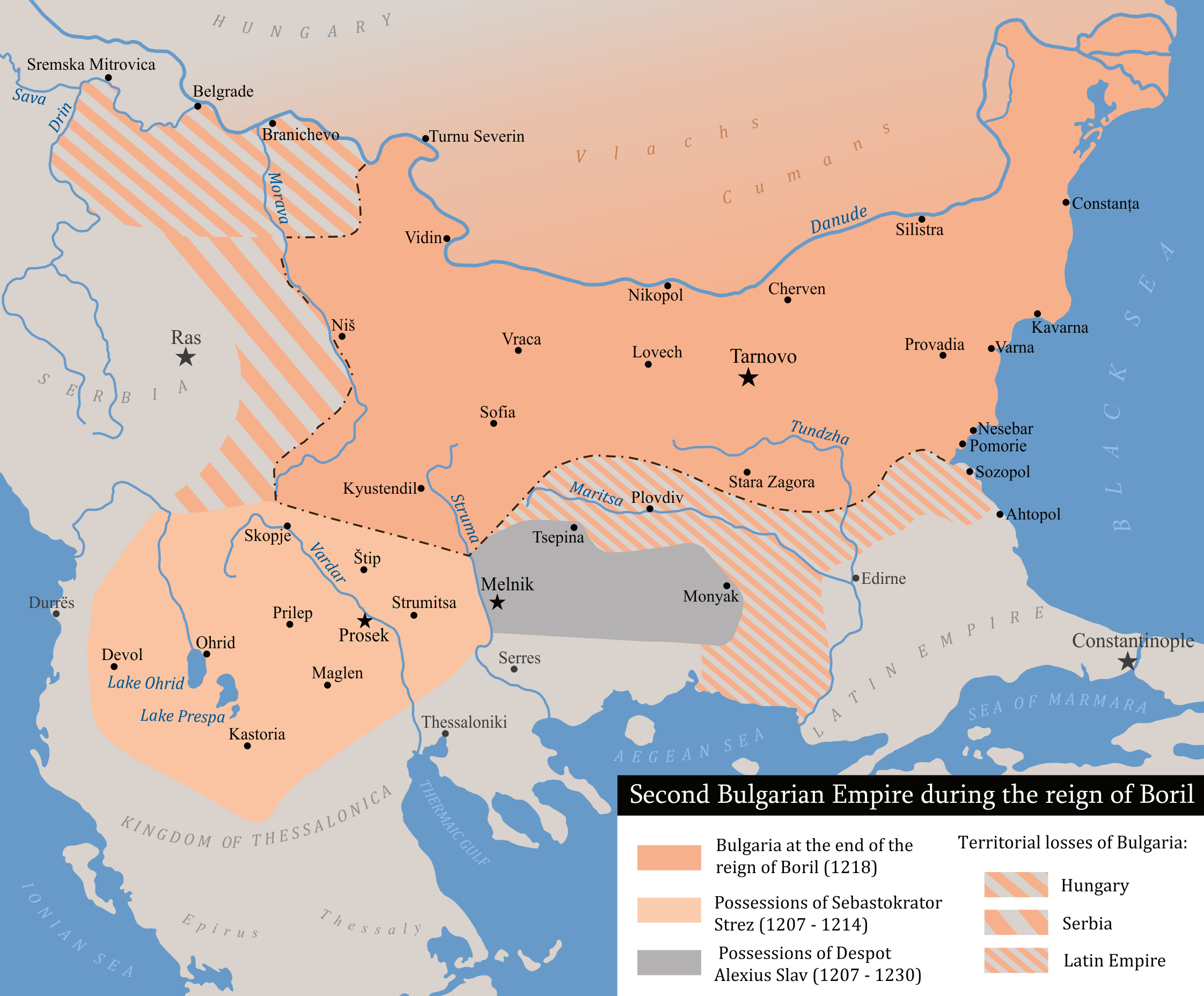
Bulgaria under Boril (1207–1218)

In the reign of Kaloyan, the Greek noblemen of eastern Thrace had risen up against the Bulgarian Empire, seeking assistance from the Latin Empire; this rebellion would continue against Boril, who left for Thrace to reconquer the region in May 1208. During his march, he seized parts of Alexius Slav's territory before stopping at Stara Zagora. The Latin Emperor personally led his army against Boril, forcing him to withdraw to Philippopolis (modern Plovdiv). Although Boril's army outnumbered the Latin troops, Henry defeated him near the town on 8 July. The Latins captured Philippopolis and Alexius Slav voluntarily paid homage to Henry to secure his assistance against Boril. While Boril was waging war against the Latins, Stefan Nemanjić invaded Macedonia and occupied the land between the Struma and Vardar rivers. He granted the occupied territories to Strez but left Serbian troops in the region to secure his loyalty.

The Greeks of Serres in the Kingdom of Thessalonica sent envoys to Boril's commander in Melnik, seeking his assistance against the Latins in early 1209. Henry soon intervened and suppressed their revolt. Boril concluded an alliance with Theodore I Laskaris, Emperor of Nicaea, and Michael I Komnenos Doukas, the Greek ruler of Epirus, against the Latins. He also made peace with Strez who had turned against Nemanjić.

Boril convened a synod of the Church of his realm in Tarnovo in early 1211. The bishops confirmed the Orthodox confession adopted at the Council of Constantinople in 843 and condemned the Bogomils, ordering their persecution as heretics. The synod established the date of Easter in accordance with the Catholic calendar. Boril, who had presided over the synod, ordered the publication of its decisions in Bulgarian on 11 February 1211.

Boril sent an army to a mountain pass to prepare an ambush for the Latin Emperor Henry who was returning from Thessaloniki to Constantinople in April 1211. Having been informed of Boril's plan, Henry gathered his troops from the nearby Latin fortresses and forced Boril to withdraw his army. Strez invaded the Kingdom of Thessalonica, but Michael of Epirus, who had made peace with the Latins, invaded his realm. Boril intervened in the conflict on Strez's behalf, but their united armies were defeated near Bitola in early summer. He launched an assault on Thessaloniki in October, but Eustace of Flanders, who administered the kingdom as regent, forced him to lift the siege. Alexius Slav intervened the conflict on Eustace's behalf and captured Melnik.

=== Uprising ===
John Fine says Boril held the Church synod to secure the support of the clergy for himself, because "popular dissatisfaction with his reign may still have existed" in 1211. An uprising which broke out in Vidin between 1211 and 1214 demonstrated the existence of popular discontent with him. The exact circumstances of the movement are uncertain because the only source of information about these events are in fragmentary data preserved in a Hungarian royal charter issued in 1250.

Boril was unable to suppress the rebellion without external assistance, turning to Andrew II of Hungary, reminding him of "their reliable friendship". Andrew dispatched Joachim, Count of Hermannstadt (now Sibiu in Romania), to Bulgaria at the head of an army of Saxon, Vlach, Székely and Pecheneg troops. Joachim first routed three Cuman chieftains who tried to halt his invasion, then captured Vidin and returned it to Boril.

=== Reconciliation ===
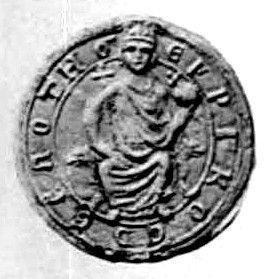
Seal of Henry of Flanders, Latin Emperor of Constantinople

A papal legate (identified as Pelagius of Albano) came to Bulgaria in the summer of 1213. He continued his journey towards Constantinople, implying that his mediation contributed to the subsequent reconciliation between Boril and Henry. Boril desired peace because he had already realised that he would be unable to regain the Thracian territories lost to the Latin Empire; Henry wanted peace with Bulgaria in order to resume his war against Emperor Theodore I Laskaris. After lengthy negotiations, Henry married Boril's stepdaughter (whom modern historians wrongly call Maria) in late 1213 or early 1214.

In early 1214, Boril offered the hand of his unnamed daughter to Andrew II of Hungary's son and heir, Béla. Madgearu says he also renounced the lands that Andrew had claimed from Bulgaria (including Braničevo). In an attempt to conquer new lands, Boril launched an invasion of Serbia, laying siege to Niš in 1214, aided by troops sent by Henry. At the same time, Strez invaded Serbia from the south, although he was killed during his campaign. Boril was unable to seize Niš however, due to conflicts between the Bulgarian and Latin troops. Conflicts between Boril and the Latin troops prevented them from capturing the town.

=== Fall ===
Boril was deprived of his two principal allies by 1217, as Latin Emperor Henry died in July 1216, and Andrew II left Hungary to lead a crusade to the Holy Land in 1217; this position of weakness enabled his cousin, Ivan Asen, to invade Bulgaria. Boril was beaten by Ivan Asen in battle, and forced to withdraw to Tarnovo, which Ivan's troops laid siege to. The Byzantine historian, George Akropolites, stated that the siege lasted "for seven years", however, most modern historians believe that it was actually seven months. After Ivan Asen's troops seized the town in 1218, Boril attempted to flee but was captured and blinded. No further information was recorded about Boril's fate.

== Family ==
Akropolites described Boril's first wife (the widow of his uncle) as a "Scythian" (or Cuman). Boril's marriage to his uncle's widow violated canon law, but the Bulgarian Church did not protest against it. Baldwin of Avesnes, the Chronicle of Flanders and other Western European chronicles say that an unnamed niece of the Latin Emperor Henry (the daughter of his sister, Yolanda of Flanders, and Peter II of Courtenay) was given in marriage to "Johannis", who is associated with Boril. Historians who accept the reliability of this report say that Boril married Henry's niece after their peace treaty in 1213 or 1214. If this theory is valid, Boril's first wife either had died or had been sent to a monastery. Boril's daughter was engaged to the Hungarian crown prince, Béla, in 1214, but the marriage never took place, due to Boril's deposition.

== Sources ==
=== Primary sources ===
- George Akropolites: The History (Translated with and Introduction and Commentary by Ruth Macrides) (2007). Oxford University Press. ISBN 978-0-19-921067-1.

=== Secondary sources ===
- Curta, Florin (2006). Southeastern Europe in the Middle Ages, 500–1250. Cambridge University Press. ISBN 978-0-521-85085-8.
- Fine, John V. A. (1994). The Late Medieval Balkans: A Critical Survey from the Late Twelfth Century to the Ottoman Conquest. The University of Michigan Press. ISBN 0-472-08260-4.
- Levin, Eve (1989). Sex and Society in the World of the Orthodox Slavs, 900–1700. Cornell University Press. ISBN 0-8014-8304-2.
- Madgearu, Alexandru (2017). The Asanids: The Political and Military History of the Second Bulgarian Empire, 1185–1280. BRILL. ISBN 978-9-004-32501-2.
- Vásáry, István (2005). Cumans and Tatars: Oriental Military in the Pre-Ottoman Balkans, 1185–1365. Cambridge University Press. ISBN 0-521-83756-1.

Boril of Bulgaria Asen dynasty
Regnal titles
Preceded by Kaloyan	Emperor of Bulgaria; 1207–1218	Succeeded by Ivan Asen II
