= Jeremiah (Bulgarian priest) =

10th-century Bulgarian priest and writer

Jeremiah (Church Slavonic: І҆еремі́а Bulgarian: Йеремия, Yeremia) was a 10th-century Bulgarian priest and writer usually associated with the origins of Bogomilism. The earliest mention of him is found in a work of Patriarch Sisinnius II of Constantinople (c. 996–999). He is sometimes associated with, though more often distinguished from, the priest Bogomil.

Bulgarian historian Yordan Andreev describes Jeremiah as one of the chief followers of Priest Bogomil, the founding figure of Bogomilism. In contemporary sources, Jeremiah was described as Bogomil's “son and disciple”, the former in the figurative sense. Indeed, Croatian Slavist Vatroslav Jagić identifies Jeremiah with Bogomil himself, a hypothesis that has been accepted by some scholars and rejected by others.

Jeremiah was the author of a number of apocryphal texts, most notably Tale of the Cross Tree, and several fables. Due to their heretical nature, his works were included in medieval indices of forbidden books. According to Andreev, Jeremiah's works do not contain any traces of Bogomilism, but rather a different look at Christianity.
