= Bogomil (priest) =

10th-century Bulgarian priest

Bogomil (Cyrillic: Богомил) was a 10th-century Bulgarian priest who was connected with the origins of Bogomilism. Bogomil is a Theophoric name consisting of Bog (God) and mil (dear) and means "[one who is] dear to god". He was declared a heresiarch by both the Catholic and Orthodox churches.

According to Cosmas the Priest, Bogomil first began to preach his beliefs in Bulgaria during the reign of Peter I of Bulgaria (927 to 969), which indicates that Cosmas must have been writing later than 969. As with Cosmas, the life of Bogomil is shrouded in mystery and what little is known of him comes from the sermons written against him. There is some uncertainty about his relationship to Jeremiah or whether they are the same person. The statement that Jeremiah was "a son (disciple) of Bogomil" may be an interpolation. His name is mentioned in the Book of Boril.

The village of Bogomil in Bulgaria, as well as Bogomil Cove on Rugged Island in the South Shetland Islands, Antarctica, are named after him.
