= Kumankata =

Anna

Empress consort of Bulgaria
- Tenure: 1st 1197 - 8 October 1207; 2nd 1207/08 - ?
- Spouse: Kaloyan of Bulgaria; Boril of Bulgaria

Anna, known in Bulgarian historiography as Kumankata (Bulgarian: Куманката, "the Cuman [woman]") (fl. 1207), was the Empress consort of Bulgaria by marriage to Kaloyan of Bulgaria and Boril of Bulgaria.

The name Anna was the name she took when she converted to Christianity. The original name of the Cuman noblewoman who subsequently married two Tsars Emperors of Bulgaria, Kaloyan of Bulgaria and Boril of Bulgaria, is unknown. There are only two sources mentioning her, both foreign. The Byzantine historian George Akropolites claimed that after the death of Kaloyan, his sister's son Boril 'married his Scythian aunt'. From this evidence, it is not sure whether the Tsaritsa was really a Cuman, or she belonged to another tribe that could be described as Scythian. As Veselin Ignatov points out, given the strong relations between the Asen dynasty and the Cumans, her Cuman lineage is the most probable possibility, but not the only one.

The second source mentioning the Tsaritsa was made by Canon Alberih about 1241. He repeated a story that he had heard from a Flemish priest who claimed to have visited the Bulgarian capital of Tarnovo. The priest claimed that the Tsaritsa fell in love with the captive Latin Emperor Baldwin I of Constantinople and while her husband was away, she sent the Emperor a love letter, promising that she would help him escape if he took her with him and crown her his Empress. When Baldwin rejected her, she complained to Kaloyan, claiming that the captive Emperor had tried to convince her to help him run away, proposing to wed and crown her. Kaloyan believed her and one night, while drunk, had Baldwin killed in his presence. Most historians distrust this source, since the reasons for Baldwin's death are well known and verified by Byzantine and Latin sources: he was killed along with other captives, both Byzantine and Latin, because Kaloyan was angered by the Byzantines breaking their contract with him and joining the Crusaders. Another reason for the historians' distrust of the story is the time of its arising: almost forty years after the events took place, and it was spread in France, not Bulgaria. As Ignatov points out, Alberih himself started the story by elaborating that he did not deliver confirmed data, so it might be just a rumour without any proof and still more, backed up by no logic, since the Bulgarian Tsaritsa wore the crown of a prospering state, she was wife to the victor over Byzantines, Latins, Serbians, and Hungarians, while Baldwin I was defeated, imprisoned, humiliated. She had nothing to gain by sharing his crown - she had her own, and right then, it was worth far more than his.

The birth year of the Tsaritsa and the name that she was given at birth are not known, but it seems likely that with a view to her marriage to Kaloyan, she converted to Christianity and adopted the name Anna. After Kaloyan's death in 1207, she married his nephew and successor Boril of Bulgaria and that fact, combined with the probable Cuman identity of Kaloyan's supposed murderer, Manastur, encouraged many historians, especially those from the end of 19th and the first half of 20th century, to believe that together with Boril, she was part of a conspiracy that took her husband's life. During the last few decades, the idea of the Empress' part in the conspiracy has been accepted with distrust by many historians. Despite the differences in their beliefs about the reasons for Kaloyan's death - a conspiracy of Byzantines and Latins, death by natural reasons - Ivan Duichev, Ivan Bogilov, Genoveva Tzancova-Petkova, and Veselin Ignatov all support the idea that Boril's marriage with the Dowager Tsaritsa was only a way to legalize his coming to the throne. Whatever the truth, to this day there is no evidence connecting the Tsaritsa with Kaloyan's death.

Like her wedding to Kaloyan, the date of her wedding to Boril is unknown. His ascension to the throne was supported by her compatriots, the Cumans, but a few years later there was a great Cuman riot against him. There is no concrete evidence in the sources, but it is likely that Boril repudiated the Tsaritsa and sent her to monastery where she became a nun and assumed the name Anisia. Boril then married a niece of the Latin Emperor Henry of Flanders. Nothing is known about the Tsaritsa's later life.

Historians have controversial minds about whether she had children by any or both her marriages. Zlatarsky supports the idea that the princess whom Boril gave to the Latin Emperor Henry in marriage was the Tsaritsa's daughter by Kaloyan, and Ignatov believes that she gave a son to Kaloyan. Other historians give her a second daughter, this time by Boril, but nothing is verified for certain this far.

== In fiction ==
The Cuman Tsaritsa of Bulgaria is portrayed in Fani Popova-Mutafova's historical novels about Kaloyan's reign. In the novels, she is Kaloyan's second wife and is given the Cuman name Tzelguba.

In the opera Tsar Kaloyan by Pancho Vladigerov, she is given the Christian name Maria.

== See also ==
- Second Bulgarian Empire
- List of Bulgarian consorts
- Elizabeth the Cuman
