= Euthymios Zigabenos =

12th-century Greek monk and commentator on the Bible

Zigabenos' Commentary on the Psalms in a 15th-century manuscript

Euthymius Zigabenus or Zigadenus or Zygadenus (Greek: Εὐθύμιος Ζιγαβηνός or Ζυγαδηνός; died after 1118) was a 12th-century monk and commentator on the Bible. He was a friend of the Byzantine emperor Alexius I Comnenus, for whom he wrote a lengthy work on heresies, Panoplia Dogmatica or Panoply of Doctrine (or "Full Armour of Belief"). This began in the apostolic era and continued down to the Bogomils, some of whom he personally examined. The entry on the Bogomils is our main source of information about them. Nothing is known about his life.

He was a monk and lived in the monastery of the Virgin Mary near Constantinople. He was favoured by both the emperor and his daughter Anna Comnena, who extols his learning and piety in her Alexiad.

He also wrote a commentary on the Psalms, one on the four gospels, and one on the Pauline epistles. These are based mainly on patristic sources. Works translated into English include: Commentary on the Holy Gospel of Luke, Commentary on the Holy Gospel of John, Commentary on Hebrews and Titus.

Spurious works under his name include "The Exposition of the Nicene-Constantinople Creed" and "Dialogue with a Muslim".

== Pericope Adulterae in John ==
Bruce Metzger argued that "No Greek Church Father prior to Euthymius Zigabenus (twelfth century) comments on this passage, and Euthymius declares that the accurate copies of the Gospel do not contain it". But this is somewhat misleading, in that Didymus the Blind discusses it, albeit not in John's gospel.

Zigabenus says:

But it is necessary to know that the things which are found from this place to that where it is said: Therefore Jesus again spoke of these things saying, I am the light of the world: in the more exact copies, these are either not found, or marked with an obelus, because they seem illegitimate and added. And the argument for this is because Chrysostom makes no mention anywhere of this; but for us we must also declare that this, because it is not without usefulness, is the chapter on the woman taken in adultery, which is placed between these.

== Bibliography ==
- J.-P. Migne, Patrologia Graeca, vols. 128–131.
- Schaff, P., History of the Christian Church, Volume IV: Mediaeval Christianity. A.D. 590-1073. section 150. Erroneously calls Anna the emperor's wife rather than daughter.
- Friedrich Wilhelm Bautz (1975). "Euthymius Zigabenus (richtiger: Zigadenus)". In Bautz, Friedrich Wilhelm (ed.). Biographisch-Bibliographisches Kirchenlexikon (BBKL) (in German). Vol. 1. Hamm: Bautz. cols. 1572–1573. ISBN 3-88309-013-1. with bibliography
- John Raffan, Edition and translation of Euthymius Zigabenus, Commentary on the Psalms
