= Book of the Secret Supper =

Bogomil apocryphal text and Cathar scripture

The Book of the Secret Supper (Cena Secreta), also known as Interrogatio Iohannis (The Questions of John), The Book of John the Evangelist and The Gospel of the Secret Supper was a Bogomil apocryphal text from Bulgaria, possibly based on a now lost Paulician treatise, which also became an important Cathar scripture. The book was translated into Latin and introduced to Italy in the late 12th century, then taken to Provence before the Albigensian Crusade by the Cathar bishop Nazarials or Nazario.

Two manuscripts survive; one was found in the archives of the Inquisition in the French town of Carcassonne in Languedoc, a Cathar stronghold, and the other was kept in the National Library of Vienna, Austria. There are significant differences between the two texts indicating independent manuscript traditions.

A postscript added to the Carcassonne manuscript by the Inquisitors states, "This is the Secret of the heretics of Concorrezzo, brought from Bulgaria by Nazarials, their bishop. It is full of errors."

== Contents ==
The Book of the Secret Supper is a first-person narrative beginning "I, John…" in which John the Evangelist poses a series of questions to Jesus at a secret supper in the kingdom of heaven.

=== Creation ===
The book begins with the story of the opposing cosmic forces: God, the Invisible Father and creator of good, and Satan, the creator of evil. The book exhibits a mitigated dualism by stating that Satan was a former angel of God before falling, shining white before his fall and burning red after.

Jesus tells John how Satan took over the semi-created world, descending from the third heaven and recruiting angels to join him “according to the plan of the Governor Most High.” Satan brought forth all living things, plants, animals, fish and birds, then created man and woman from clay in order to serve him, animating the man with an angel from the second heaven and the woman with an angel from the first heaven. The angels were distressed at having to inhabit material forms. Satan encouraged them to sin, but they did not know how, so Satan filled the woman with a longing for sin, then created a serpent from his spittle, inhabited it and seduced her with its tail. He then filled Adam with lust for debauchery with the result that all their children were offspring of the devil and of the serpent.

=== Nativity ===
Jesus then describes his own birth, telling John that the Father sent an angel, in the form of Mary, to receive Him in the Holy Spirit. Jesus descended from the seventh heaven and came forth from her ear. Satan then sent Elijah in the form of John the Baptist to give a false baptism by water, but John is warned that only baptism in spirit by Jesus can bring about the remission of sin: "Can man be saved through the baptism [of John?" He replied:] "Without my baptism, with which I baptize unto the remission of sins, I affirm that no one can receive salvation in God". Those baptized with water marry, but those baptized in the spirit remain celibate: "The followers of John marry and are given in marriage, whereas my disciples marry not at all but remain as the angels of God in the heavenly kingdom."

=== Last Judgement ===
The final part of the book is a description of the Last Judgement when those who have followed an angelic life shall be honored, while those who lived a life of iniquity shall find wrath, fury and distress in everlasting fire. Satan, after waging war upon the just, will be bound with unbreakable bonds and cast into a pool of fire. Then the Son of God will sit on the right hand of his Father, the righteous will be set among the choirs of angels, God shall be in the midst of them and wipe away their tears, and of His kingdom there shall be no end for ever and ever.

== See also ==
- Gnosticism
- List of Gospels

== Sources ==
- Benoist, I., "Histoire des Albigeois et des Vaudois ou Barbets" (1691)
- Thilo, J. K., "Codex apocryphus Novi Testaments" (1832)
- Reitzenstein, R. "Die Vorgeschichte der christlichen Taufe" (1929)
- James, M. R. "The Apocryphal New Testament" Oxford: Clarendon Press (1924) ISBN 978-0198261216
- Wakefield, Walter L. & Evans, Austin P. "Heresies of the High Middle Ages" New York: Columbia Univiversity Press (1991) ISBN 978-0231096324
