= Book of Boril =

1211 Bulgarian book

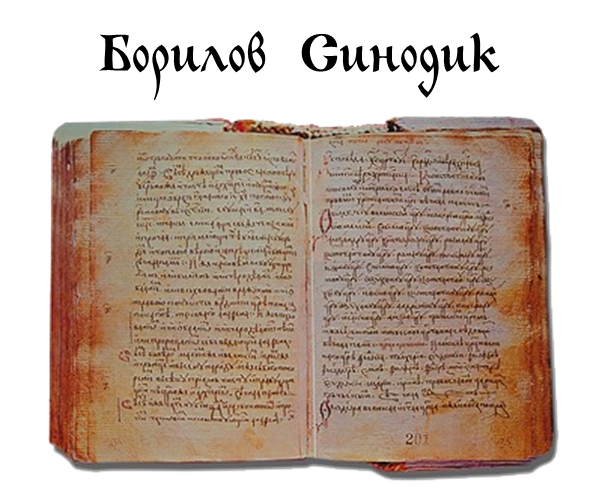
- Language: Old Bulgarian
- Publication place: Bulgaria

The Book of Boril or Boril Synodic (Bulgarian: Борилов синодик) is a medieval Bulgarian book from the beginning of the 13th century. It is an important source for the history of the Bulgarian Empire.

The book was written in conjunction with the Synod of Tarnovo (1211) convoked by tsar Boril against the Bogomils in 1211. Later additions and editions were made, dated at the end of XIV c.

== External references ==
- excerpt from Boril's book
- Institute of History at the Bulgarian Academy of Sciences
- brief description and digital facsimile of the oldest copy of the Book of Boril
