= Synod of Tarnovo (1211) =

Council of the Bulgarian Church

The Synod of Tarnovo was a council of the Bulgarian Church, at that time in union with Rome, held at Veliko Tarnovo in 1211. Emperor (or Tsar) Boril of Bulgaria convoked it to condemn Bogomilism. The decisions of the synod were included in a document, now known as the Book of Boril.

== Sources ==
- Fine, John V. A. Jr. (1994) [1987]. The Late Medieval Balkans: A Critical Survey from the Late Twelfth Century to the Ottoman Conquest. Ann Arbor, Michigan: University of Michigan Press. ISBN 978-0-472-10079-8. OCLC 749133662.
- Madgearu, Alexandru (2017). The Asanids: The Political and Military History of the Second Bulgarian Empire, 1185–1280. BRILL. ISBN 978-9-004-32501-2.
