= Cosmas the Priest =

Bulgarian priest and writer

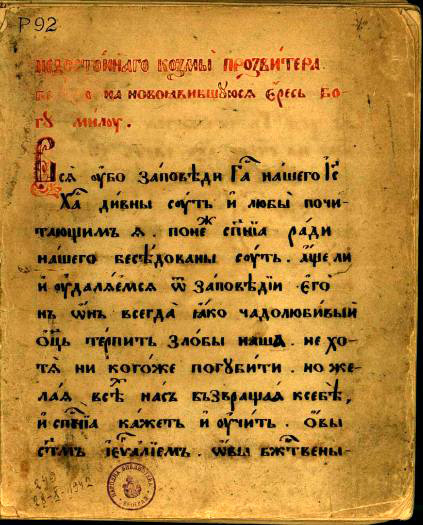
A page from Cosmas the Priest's Sermon Against the Heretics

Cosmas the Priest (Bulgarian: Презвитер Козма, Prezviter Kozma), also known as Cosmas the Presbyter or Presbyter Cosmas, was a medieval Bulgarian priest and writer. Cosmas is most famous for his anti-Bogomil treatise Sermon Against the Heretics, which, despite not being conclusively dated, is generally ascribed to the 10th century. The treatise is a valuable source on the beginnings of the Bogomil heresy in Bulgaria, as well as on medieval Bulgarian society.

== Life ==
The little that is known about Cosmas can be extracted from the few words that he writes about himself in Sermon Against the Heretics. As was customary to medieval priests and writers, Cosmas refers to himself as "unworthy". However, he was certainly of no low rank, as in his treatise he widely criticised the high clergy of the Bulgarian Patriarchate. Bulgarian historian Plamen Pavlov theorises Cosmas must have been a high-ranking member of the ecclesiastical hierarchy and would have written his treatise under direct orders from the Bulgarian emperor. There is no data as to where in Bulgaria Cosmas was based: suppositions range from the capital Preslav and eastern Bulgaria in general, to Ohrid and the region of Macedonia, and even Veliko Tarnovo. Though Cosmas is not known to have been canonised, he is commonly referred to as "blessed" or a "saint" in the copies of his treatise.

The dating of Cosmas' activity and thus the writing of Sermon Against the Heretics is an extremely problematic issue. The general consensus among scholars is that Cosmas lived in the middle or the second half of the 10th century. However, individual scholarly opinions associate Cosmas' life with the first half of the 11th century and even the early 13th century. While Cosmas never mentions the date of writing of his treatise, he does leave some chronological details. Cosmas calls the Bogomil heresy "newly-appeared" and refers to the apparently popular "John, the new presbyter and exarch", whom most scholars identify with early-10th-century Bulgarian writer John Exarch. Cosmas insists that the heresy spread during the reign of Tsar Peter I (r. 927–969), yet according to historian Dimitri Obolensky he also claims Peter's rule was already over by the time of writing.

== Sermon Against the Heretics ==
Cosmas the Priest's only known work, Sermon Against the Heretics, bears the full title Homily of the Unworthy Presbyter Cosmas Against the Newly-Appeared Bogomil Heresy or, in other manuscripts, Sermon of Saint Cosmas Presbyter Against the Heretics, A Discussion and an Instruction from the Books of God. It has been preserved in 25 full copies, all from East Slavic sources, and 116 excerpts or compilations, some of which are of South Slavic origin. The earliest of the extant copies was made in the 15th century. As attested by the large number of copies, Cosmas' work was particularly popular in medieval Russia and Serbia. There, it was even used as a basis for writings against other heresies.

The treatise is recognised as the earliest and most complete work to tell of the nature of Bogomilism, its origins and its dualistic doctrine. As Catharism originated from Bogomilism, Sermon Against the Heretics is valuable as an insight into Catharism's Balkan predecessor. It is also an important source on life and society in 10th-century Bulgaria, which is described as suffering a major crisis, the glorious days of Peter's father Simeon the Great (r. 893–927) long over.

Sermon Against the Heretics is divided into two sections, which may be seen as separate works due to their somewhat different topics. The first part presents details about various aspects of the Bogomil heresy and identifies a certain priest named Bogomil as its founder (though, Cosmas claims, it was actually an act of the devil himself). The first section of the treatise is a vehement criticism of Bogomilism and its disobedient followers, whom Cosmas accuses of contributing to the degradation of Bulgarian society. As Cosmas purposefully employed around 70 quotations from Apostle Paul to debunk the beliefs of Bogomils, he was very likely aware of the sect's ancestral ties to Paulicianism.

The second part of the treatise contains Cosmas' criticism on contemporary Bulgarian society, with particular attention to the religious and social issues of the time. While Cosmas was a staunch supporter of the Bulgarian Orthodox Church's policies against Bogomilism, in the second section he spares no criticism to that religious body's other practices. Cosmas accuses the Bulgarian abbots and bishops of greed, gluttony and neglect towards the congregation. He is also critical of hermits, whose popularity and influence at the time Cosmas saw as inappropriate. Cosmas hints that the emergence of Bogomilism should be blamed at least partially on the contemporary state of the Bulgarian Orthodox Church.

== Legacy ==
Kozma Cove on Desolation Island of the South Shetland Islands in Antarctica was named in honour of Cosmas the Priest by the Antarctic Place-names Commission of Bulgaria. The northeastern Bulgarian village of Kozma Prezviter in Omurtag Municipality, Targovishte Province, bears the name of the medieval writer. Until it was renamed in 1934, it was known under the Turkish appellation Kara Chufallar. Streets in the major cities of Sofia, Plovdiv, Varna and Pernik have also been dedicated to Cosmas the Priest.

== Sources ==
- Curta, Florin (2006). Southeastern Europe in the Middle Ages, 500–1250. Cambridge: Cambridge University Press. ISBN 978-0-521-81539-0.
- Eteriano, Hugh; Hamilton, Janet; Hamilton, Sarah; Hamilton, Bernard (2004). Contra Patarenos. BRILL. ISBN 978-90-04-14000-4.
- "Резултати за "Презвитер Козма"" [Results for "Prezviter Kozma"] (in Bulgarian). KartaBg.com. Archived from the original on 13 July 2011.
- Kazhdan, Alexander (1991). Oxford Dictionary of Byzantium. Oxford University Press. ISBN 978-0-19-504652-6.
- "Kozma Cove". SCAR Composite Gazetteer of Antarctica. Archived from the original on 25 November 2010.
- Loos, Milan (1974). Dualist heresy in the Middle Ages. Vol. 10. Springer. ISBN 978-90-247-1673-9.
- Obolensky, Dimitri (2004). The Bogomils: A Study in Balkan Neo-Manichaeism. Cambridge: Cambridge University Press. ISBN 978-0-521-60763-6.
- Peters, Edward (1980). Heresy and authority in medieval Europe: documents in translation. University of Pennsylvania Press. ISBN 978-0-8122-1103-0.
- Sampimon, Janette; van Halsema, Sara (2005). "Cosmas Presbyter. Homily Against the Bogumils. Operational Edition" (PDF). Ohio State University. Archived from the original (PDF) on 15 July 2007.
- Strayer, Joseph Reese (1992). The Albigensian Crusades. University of Michigan Press. ISBN 978-0-472-06476-2.
- Андреев, Йордан; Лазаров, Иван; Павлов, Пламен (1999). Кой кой е в средновековна България [Who is Who in Medieval Bulgaria] (in Bulgarian). Петър Берон. ISBN 978-954-402-047-7.
- "История на с.Козма Презвитер" [History of the village of Kozma Prezviter] (in Bulgarian). kozmaprezviter.com. Archived from the original on 30 January 2011.
