= Bogomilism =

10th-century Bulgarian neo-Gnostic sect

Bogomilism or Bogumilism (Bulgarian: богомилство, romanized: bogomilstvo; Macedonian: богомилство, romanized: bogomilstvo; Serbo-Croatian: bogumilstvo / богумилство) was a Christian neo-Gnostic or pseudo-Gnostic dualist sect founded in the First Bulgarian Empire by the priest Bogomil during the reign of Tsar Peter I in the 10th century. It most likely arose in the region of Kutmichevitsa, today part of the region of Macedonia.

The Bogomils were dualists or Gnostics in that they believed in a world within the body and a world outside the body. They did not use the Christian cross, nor build churches, as they revered their gifted form and considered their body to be the temple. This gave rise to many forms of practice to cleanse the body through fasting or dancing.

The Bogomils rejected the ecclesiastical hierarchy. Their primary political tendencies were resistance to the state and church authorities. This helped the movement spread quickly in the Balkans, gradually expanding throughout the Byzantine Empire and later reaching Kievan Rus', Dalmatia, Serbia, Bosnia, Italy, and France (Cathars).

== Etymology ==
The term Bogomil in free translation means "dear to God", and is a compound of the Slavic words for "god" (Common Slavic: *bogъ) and "dear" (Common Slavic: *milъ). It may be also a translation of the Greek name Theophilos, literally "dear to God; loved by the gods," from theos "god" + philos "loved, beloved". It is difficult to ascertain whether the name was taken from the reputed founder of that movement, the priest Bogomil, or whether he assumed that name after it had been given to the sect itself. The Bogomils are identified with the Messalians in Greek and Slavonic documents from the 12th–14th centuries.

The members are referred to as Babuni in Church Slavonic documents, which originally meant "superstition; superstitious person" (Common Slavic: *babonъ, *babunъ *babona). Toponyms which retain the name include the river Babuna, the mountain Babuna, the Bogomila Waterfall and village Bogomila, all in the region of Azot, today in central North Macedonia, suggesting that the movement was very active in the region.

== Sources ==
Much of their literature has been lost or destroyed by the contemporary Christian Churches. The earliest description of the Bogomils is in a letter from Patriarch Theophylact of Bulgaria to Peter I of Bulgaria. The main source of doctrinal information is the work of Euthymius Zigabenus, who says that they believe that God created man's soul but matter was the invention of Satan, God's older son, who in seducing Eve lost his creative power. Concerning the Bogomils, something can be gathered from the polemic Against the Newly-Appeared Heresy of the Bogomils written in Slavonic by Cosmas the Priest, a 10th-century Bulgarian official. The old Slavonic lists of forbidden books of the 15th and 16th century also give us a clue to the discovery of this heretical literature and of the means the Bogomils employed to carry on their teachings. Much may also be learned from the doctrines of the numerous variations of Bogomilism which spread in Medieval Kievan Rus' after the 11th century.

== History ==
=== Paulicians ===
One of the earliest Christian dualist sects, Marcionism, originated in Armenia (in the eastern part of present Turkey). The church Marcion himself established appeared to die out around the 5th century, although similarities between Marcionism and Paulicianism, a sect in the same geographical area, indicate that Marcionist elements may have survived. Paulicianism began in the mid-7th century, when Constantine of Mananalis, basing his message solely on his personal interpretation of the New Testament, began to teach that there were two gods: a good god who had made men's souls, and an evil god who had created the entire physical universe including the human body. His followers, who became known as Paulicians, were not marked by extreme deviance in lifestyle compared to contemporaries, despite their belief that the world was evil, and were renowned as good fighting men.

However, it is not certain whether Paulicianism was dualistic, as in the Key of Truth it is said that: "The Paulicians are not dualists in any other sense than the New Testament is itself dualistic. Satan is simply the adversary of man and God".

Around 747–752, Byzantine Emperor Constantine V forcibly transplanted large numbers of Paulicians from Armenia and Syria to Thrace—specifically around Philippopolis (today's Plovdiv, Bulgaria) to act as a military buffer against the Bulgars. Subsequent iconoclast emperors continued this policy. For nearly two centuries before Bogomil preached, these communities actively spread these aforesaid New Testament "dualist" ideas among the local Slavic population. By the 940s, the priest Bogomil synthesized these long-present Paulician teachings with local Slavic grievances against the Bulgarian church and nobility. This is the movement Patriarch Theophylact responded to.

In 970, when the Byzantine emperor John I Tzimiskes transplanted 200,000 more Armenian Paulicians and settled them in the neighbourhood of Philippopolis, he was adding to an established stronghold. While this 970 influx did not start Bogomilism, it supercharged dualism in Thrace, helping Philippopolis become a major missionary hub that later exported dualist ideas toward Western Europe.

Under Byzantine and much later Ottoman rule, the Armenian Paulicians lived in relative safety in their ancient stronghold near Philippopolis, and further northward. Linguistically, they were assimilated into the Bulgarians, by whom they were called pavlikiani (the Byzantine Greek word for Paulician). In 1650, the Roman Catholic Church gathered them into its fold. Fourteen villages near Nicopolis, in Moesia, embraced Catholicism, as well as the villages around Philippopolis. A colony of Paulicians in the Wallachian village of Cioplea near Bucharest also followed the example of their brethren across the Danube.

=== Origins ===
Bogomil (Cyrillic: Богомил) was a 10th-century Bulgarian priest who was connected with the origins of Bogomilism. This Gnostic social-religious movement and doctrine originated in the time of Peter I of Bulgaria (927–969), seen in the modern day as a reaction against state and clerical oppression by the Byzantine church. In spite of all measures of repression, it remained strong and popular until the fall of the Second Bulgarian Empire in the end of the 14th century. Bogomilism was an outcome of many factors that had arisen in the beginning of the 10th century, most probably in the region of Macedonia. It was also strongly influenced by the Paulicians who had been driven out of Armenia.

=== Spread of Bogomilism in the Balkans ===
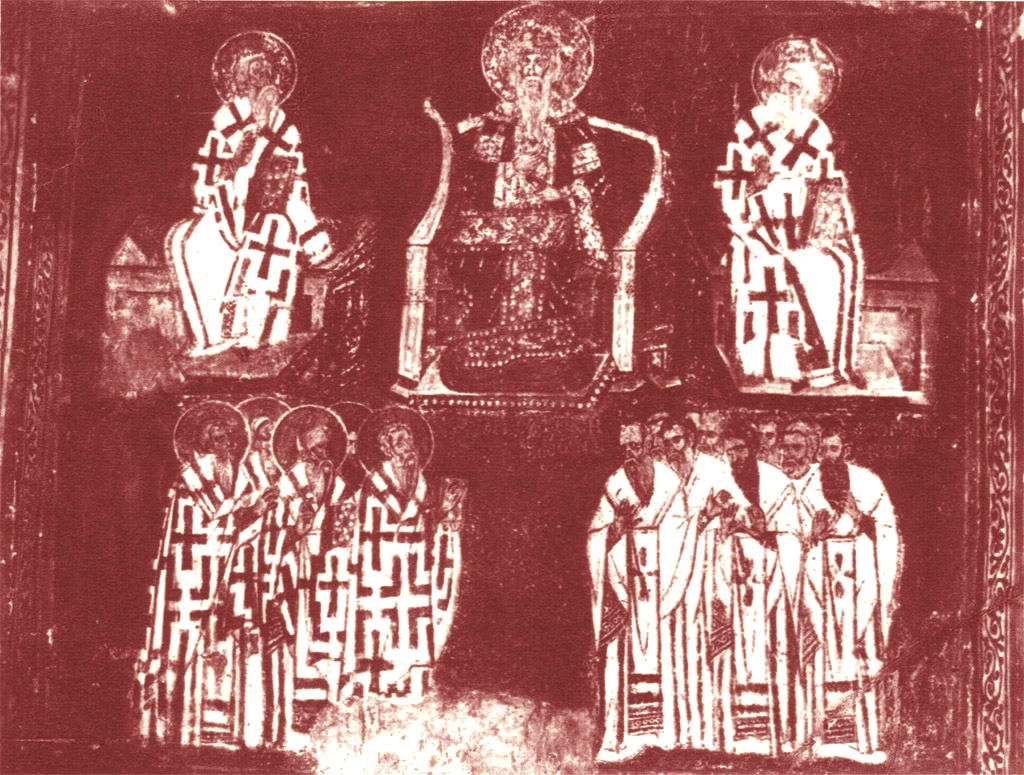
Nemanja's Council against Bogomilism, organized by Stefan Nemanja. Fresco from 1290

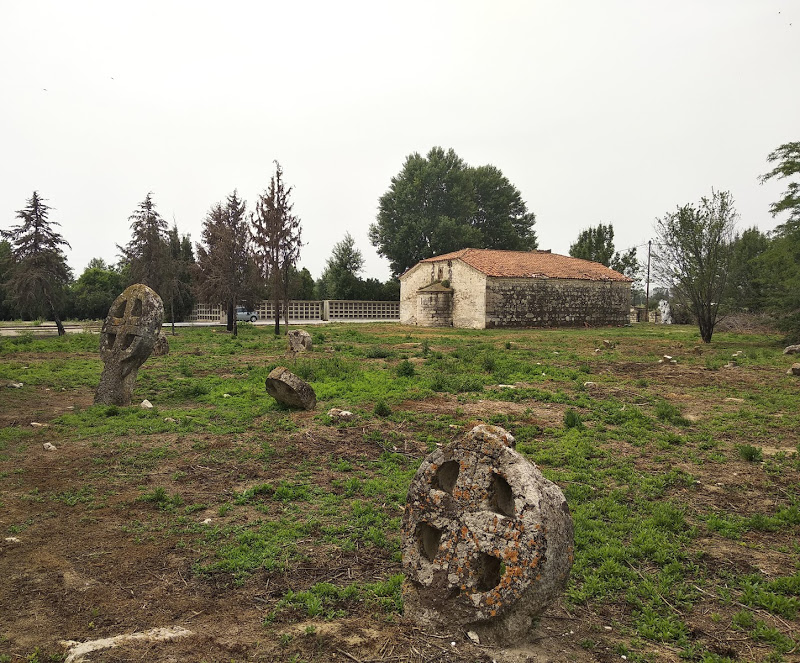
Bogomil cemetery in Chalkidona (near Thessaloniki), Greece

Slav peasantry in parts of Bulgaria were very likely the first to come into closer contact with Bogomilism and the young Bulgarian church was aware of the danger. Pope Nicholas I warns Boris I of the danger of false teachings but he was not specific about heresy as such. Bogomilism was a native Slavic sect from the middle of the 10th century that began to flourish while the Theophylact of Constantinople warned Peter I against this new heresy.

The Bogomils spread westwards and settled in Serbia, where they were to be known as Babuns (Babuni). At the end of the 12th century, Serbian Grand Prince Stefan Nemanja and the Serbian council deemed Bogomilism a heresy, and expelled them from the country. Large numbers, the majority of whom were of Vlach origin, took refuge in Bosnia and Dalmatia where they were known under the name of Patarenes (Patareni). A remarkable number of necropolises are found in this part of the Balkans, conveying an exceptional testimony to medieval European artistic and archaeological heritage. The majority of these necropolises with decorated tombstones belonged to Bogomil Vlachs.

In the time of Samuel, Bogomilism spread into Serbia and Bosnia. The most active area became west Bosnia, centred on the valley of the River Bosna. In the province of Hum (modern Herzegovina) the Bogomils were also strong, in the cities of Split and Trogir Bogomils were numerous but later they took refuge in Bosnia. Providing refuge to those labeled heretics, including Bogomils, was a recurrent pretext for Hungarian rulers to declare crusades against Bosnia and extend their influence in the region. A first Hungarian complaint to the Pope was averted by the public abjuration of the Bosnian ruler Ban Kulin, whose sister was married to Miroslav of Hum, in 1203. A second Hungarian crusade against Bosnia on the pretext of Bogomil heresy was launched in 1225, but failed. In 1254, rebelling against the Papal order to accept a Hungarian bishop, the Bosnian Church chose the schism. In the following centuries, the Bosnian Church and the heretic sect of the Bogomils came to be identified with each other, due to the scarcity of documents after the Ottoman conquest.

In 1203, Pope Innocent III, with the aid of the King of Hungary, forced an agreement of Kulin to acknowledge Papal authority and religion, but in practice this was ignored. On the death of Kulin in 1216, a mission was sent to convert Bosnia to Rome, but it failed. In 1234, the Catholic Bishop of Bosnia was removed by Pope Gregory IX for allowing heretical practices. In addition, Gregory called on the Hungarian king to crusade against the heretics. In November 1234, Pope Gregory IX asked Prince Coloman, Lord of Slavonia (brother of the Hungarian king Bela IV), to destroy the heretics. He led a crusade into Bosnia. However, Bosnian nobles were able to expel the Hungarians.

In 1252, Pope Innocent IV decided to put Bosnia's bishop under the Hungarian Kalocsa Archbishopry's jurisdiction. Such decision provoked the schism of the Bosnian Christians, who refused to submit to the Hungarians and broke off their relations with Rome. In that way, an autonomous Bosnian Church came into being, in which some later saw a Bogomil or Cathar Church, while in reality no trace of Bogomilism, Catharism or dualism can be found in the original documents of the Bosnian Krstjani, as they called themselves.

It was not until Pope Nicholas' Bull "Prae cunctis" in 1291 that the Dominican-led inquisition was imposed on Bosnia. The Inquisition reported the existence of a dualist sect in Bosnia in the late 15th century and called them "Bosnian heretics", but this sect was most likely not the same as the Bosnian Church.

Bogomilism was eradicated in Bulgaria, Rascia (a Serbian medieval state) and Byzantium in the 13th century, but some smaller elements survived in Hum (present day Herzegovina) and Bosnia until the Ottoman Empire gained control of the region in 1463. Some scholars, who sought certain ideological backgrounds and justifications for their political narratives, argue that both Catholics and Orthodox persecuted the Bogomils as heretics and according to them, the pressures drew Bosnia to Bogomilism. It has purportedly been said that, with the introduction of Ottoman rule, Bosnians were often more likely to convert to Islam since some of them were not adherents of either the Roman Catholic or Serb Orthodox churches. However, these claims have been rejected by some as an anachronism from the Austro-Hungarian era.

From Bosnia, their influence extended into Italy (Piedmont). The Hungarians undertook many crusades against the heretics in Bosnia, but towards the close of the 15th century, the conquest of that country by the Turks put an end to their persecution. Few or no remnants of Bogomilism have survived in Bosnia. The Ritual in Slavonic, written by the Bosnian Radoslav, and published in vol. xv. of the Starine of the South Slavonic Academy at Agram, shows great resemblance to the Cathar ritual published by Cunitz, 1853.

There are still over ten thousand Banat Bulgarians in Banat today in the villages of Dudeștii Vechi, Vinga, Breștea and also in the city of Timișoara, with a few in Arad; however, they no longer practice Bogomilism, having converted to Roman Catholicism. There are also a few villages of Paulicians in the Serbian part of Banat, especially the villages of Ivanovo and Belo Blato, near Pančevo.

=== Social factors ===
The gradual Christianization of the Bulgarian population, the fact that the service was initially practiced in Greek, which only the elite knew, resulted in a low level of understanding of the religion among the peasantry. Due to the constant wars during the time of Tsar Simeon I, the lands near the Byzantine border (Thrace) were devastated, and the people living there were left without occupation. The constant change of authority over these lands, and the higher taxes during the time of Tsar Peter I, gave birth to a great social discontent at the beginning of the 10th century. Moreover, the corruption of the church as an institution led to grave disappointment among its recently converted flock.

=== Religious factors ===
The existence of older Christian heresies in the Bulgarian lands (Manichaeism and Paulicianism), which were considered very dualistic, influenced the Bogomil movement. Manichaeism's origin is related to Zoroastrianism; that is why Bogomilism is sometimes indirectly connected to Zoroastrianism in the sense of its duality.

=== Connections to the royal court ===
Most probably, as Samuil of Bulgaria revolted against the Byzantine Empire, he relied on the popular support of the movement. There are no sources of Bogomil persecution during his reign (976–1014).

== Doctrine ==
оучѧтъ же своꙗ си не повиновати сѧ властелемъ своимъ
хоулѧще богатꙑѩ
царь ненавидѧтъ
рѫгаѭтъ сѧ старѣишинамъ
оукарꙗѭтъ болꙗрꙑ
мрьꙁькꙑ богоу мьнѧтъ работаѭщѧѩ цѣсарю
и вьсꙗкомоу рабоу не велѧтъ работати господиноу своѥмоу

učętŭ že svoja si ne povinovati sę vlastelemŭ svoimŭ
xulęšte bogatyję
carĭ nenavidętŭ
rǫgajǫtŭ sę starěišinamŭ
ukarjajǫtŭ boljary
mrĭzĭky bogu mĭnętŭ rabotajǫštęję cěsarju
i vĭsjakomu rabu ne velętŭ rabotati gospodinu svojemu

They teach their followers not to obey their masters; they scorn the rich, they hate the Tsars, they ridicule their superiors, they reproach the boyars, they believe that God looks in horror on those who labour for the Tsar, and advise every serf not to work for his master.

— Cosmas the Priest, Treatise Against the Bogomils

From the imperfect and conflicting data that is available, three possible conclusions could be drawn, namely that the Bogomils may have been gnostics, adoptionists or dualists.

Their dualism was initially moderate (or "monarchian"): according to their teachings, God created and rules the spiritual part of the world, and Satan the material, but Satan is ultimately inferior to God and his side by virtue of being God's son. However, Bogomils were not quite free from the absolute dualism of Manichaeism and Paulicianism, and over time adopted an absolute position too, believing God and Satan as eternal opponents, similar to the one maintained by the posterior Cathars.

Their adoptionist teaching apparently came from Paul of Samosata (though at a later period the name of Paul was believed to be that of the Apostle). They rejected the Christianity of the Orthodox churches, though did not accept the docetic teaching of some of the other gnostic sects. They also opposed established forms of government and church, alike to later Christian anarchist beliefs.

In the Bogomil and Cathar text The Secret Supper Jesus calls God his father and it says that Mary received Jesus through the Holy Spirit.

Bogomils have been accused of believing that John the Baptist comes from Satan in the Book of Boril.

Supporters of the Baptist successionism theory argue that allegations of Bogomil doctrines are largely false, due to most sources being hostile.

=== Source texts ===
Possible source texts for Bogomil doctrine include:

- The Bulgarian priest Jeremiah's "The Story of the Cross-tree" and "The Prayer Against Fever"
- Book of the Secret Supper, which was wrongly described by inquisitors as similar to the Apocryphon of John
- Vision of Isaiah (according to Euthymius Zigabenus)

Bogomils accepted the four Gospels, fourteen Epistles of Paul, the three Epistles of John, James, Jude, and an Epistle to the Laodiceans, which they professed to have. They sowed the seeds of a rich, popular religious literature in the East as well as the West. The Historiated Bible, the Letter from Heaven, the Wanderings through Heaven and Hell, the numerous Adam and Cross legends, the religious poems of the "Kalēki perehozhie" and other similar productions owe their dissemination to a large extent to the activity of the Bogomils of Bulgaria, and their successors in other lands. The Bogomils also made use of many apocryphal writings, such as Apocalypse of Abraham, 2 Enoch, and the Vision of Isaiah.

=== Cosmology ===
In their original Monarchian dualist story, Bogomils taught that God had two sons, the elder Satanail and the younger Michael. Satanail rebelled against the father and became an evil spirit. He created the lower heavens and the Earth and tried in vain to create man, though in the end he had to appeal to God for the Spirit. After creation, Adam was allowed to till the ground on condition that he sold himself and his posterity to the owner of the Earth, Satanail.

In order to free Adam and his offspring, Michael was sent in the form of a man, becoming identified with Jesus Christ, and was "elected" by God after the baptism in the Jordan. When the Holy Ghost appeared in the shape of the dove, Jesus received power to break the covenant in the form of a clay tablet (hierographon) held by Satanail from Adam. He had now become the angel Michael in a human form, and as such he vanquished Satanail, and deprived him of the suffix il (meaning God), in which his power resided. Satanail was thus transformed into Satan. However, through Satan's machinations the crucifixion took place, and Satan was the originator of the whole Orthodox community with its churches, vestments, ceremonies, sacraments and fasts, with its monks and priests. This world being the work of Satan, the perfect must eschew any and every excess of its pleasure, though not so far as asceticism.

They held the "Lord's Prayer" in high respect as the most potent weapon against Satan, and had a number of conjurations against "evil spirits". Each community had its own twelve "apostles", and women could be raised to the rank of "elect". The Bogomils wore garments like those of mendicant friars and were known as enthusiastic missionaries, travelling far and wide to propagate their doctrines. Healing the sick and exorcising evil spirits, they traversed different countries and spread their apocryphal literature along with some of the books of the Old Testament, deeply influencing the religious spirit of the nations and preparing them for the Reformation.

=== Christology and the Trinity ===
For Bogomils, "the Logos was not the Second Person of the Blessed Trinity, the Eternal Word incarnate, but merely the spoken word of God, shown in the oral teaching of Christ". Although Bogomils regarded themselves as "Trinitarian", anathemas against Bogomils (circa 1027) charge Bogomils with rejection of the Trinity. In the Bogomil and Cathar text "The Secret Supper" the book starts with: "In the name of the Father, of the Son, and of the Holy Spirit, Amen."

=== Opposition to institutions and materialism ===
The Catholic Church considered Bogomilism a heresy due to the duality in the Bogomil cosmogony, wherein the earthly sinful corporeal life is a creation of Satan, an angel that was sent to Earth.

Karp Strigolnik, who in the 14th century preached the doctrine in Novgorod, explained that St. Paul had taught that simpleminded men should instruct one another; therefore they elected their "teachers" from among themselves to be their spiritual guides, and had no special priests. There is a tradition that the Bogomils taught that prayers were to be said in private houses, not in separate buildings such as churches. Ordination was conferred by the congregation and not by any specially appointed minister. The congregation were the "elect", and each member could obtain the perfection of Christ and become a Christ or "Chlist". Marriage was not a sacrament. Bogomils refused to fast on Mondays and Fridays, and they rejected monasticism. They declared Christ to be the Son of God only through grace like other prophets, and that the bread and wine of the eucharist were not physically transformed into flesh and blood; that the last judgement would be executed by God and not by Jesus; that the images and the cross were idols and the veneration of saints and relics idolatry.

These doctrines have survived in the great Russian sects, and can be traced back to the teachings and practice of the Bogomils. But in addition to these doctrines of an adoptionist origin, they held the Manichaean dualistic conception of the origin of the world. This has been partly preserved in some of their literary remains, and has taken deep root in the beliefs and traditions of Balkan nations with substantial Bogomil followings. The chief literature of all the heretical sects throughout the ages has been that of apocryphal Biblical narratives, and the popes Jeremiah or Bogumil are directly mentioned as authors of such forbidden books "which no orthodox dare read". Though these writings are mostly of the same origin as those from the older lists of apocryphal books, they underwent a modification at the hands of their Bogomil editors, so as to be useful for the propagation of their own specific doctrines.

In its most simple form—invested with the authority of the reputed author—their account of the creation of the world and of man, the origin of sin and redemption, the history of the Cross, and the disputes between body and soul, right and wrong, heaven and hell, were embodied either in "Historiated Bibles" (Paleya) or in special dialogues held between Christ and his disciples, or between renowned Fathers of the Church who expounded these views in a simple manner adapted to the understanding of the people (Lucidaria).

== Legacy ==
=== Link with later religious movements ===
Expansion of Bogomilism in medieval Europe

The Bogomils were the connecting link between both Eastern and Western sects considered heretical. They were also the most active in disseminating "heretical" teachings in the Kievan Rus' and other European kingdoms. In the 12th and 13th centuries, the Bogomils were already known in the West as "Cathars" or as "Bulgari", i.e. Bulgarians (българи). In 1207 the Bulgarorum heresis is mentioned. In 1223, the Albigenses are declared to be the local Bougres, and in the same period mention is made of the "Pope of the Albigenses who resided within the confines of Bulgaria" (see also Nicetas, Bogomil bishop). Groups such as the Cathars, Patarenes, Waldenses, Anabaptists, and the Russian Strigolniki, and Spiritual Christians, have all, at different times, been either identified with the Bogomils or closely linked with them, despite several being unrelated and/or non-dualistic.

In the 14th century, when the Hesychast controversy broke out, the doctrine of hesychasm was accused of being a variant of Bogomilism by a section of Byzantine academics.

Considerable scholarly debate has arisen about the exact relationship between dualist groups that arose in different times and places across medieval Europe, questioning whether it was indeed a single movement or belief system which was spread from one region to the next, or if it was multiple movements which arose independently across Europe. Furthering this confusion is that many medieval sources themselves, such as the 13th century Papal Inquisition in France, would often simply assume that all dualistic groups were directly connected to previous movements, regardless of location. Inquistors often described 13th century Cathars as a direct outgrowth of surviving Manichean dualists from previous centuries—though by the same logic, Inquisitors who encountered pagan religions on the edges of the Christian world (Such as those encountered in the Baltic Crusades or the missionary efforts in Ireland) would directly accuse non-Christians of worshiping "Apollo and Mercury", simply applying previous terms and rhetoric to new contexts in which they didn't accurately apply. Thus medieval scholarship is divided over whether the "Cathars" actually were an offshoot of the "Bogomils", or if the 13th century Inquisition itself simply mistook or conflated "Cathars" for "Bogomils", due to their known tendency for conflation and confusion.

=== In modern and popular culture ===
In Foucault's Pendulum, a novel by the Italian philosopher and writer Umberto Eco, the plot concerning a widespread secret and mystic conspiracy has its ground in the disappearance of the Bogomils after the fall of the Second Bulgarian Empire under the rule of the Ottoman Empire.

The Secret Book is a Macedonian feature film combining the detective, thriller and conspiracy fiction genres, based on a fictional story of the quest for the original Slavic language "Secret Book", written by the Bogomils in Macedonia and carried to Western Europe during the Middle Ages.

A French (and, consequently, an English) word emerged based on twisted perceptions of the Bogomils by the Catholic Church. The words "bouguer" and "buggery" emerged, by way of the word "bougre" in French, from the Latin Bulgarus (Bulgarian). "Buggery" first appears in English in 1330 with the sense "abominable heresy", though "bugger" in a sexual sense is not recorded until 1555. The Oxford Dictionary of English Etymology quotes a similar form—"bowgard" (and "bouguer"), but claims that the Bulgarians were heretics "as belonging to the Greek Church, sp. Albigensian". Webster's Third New International Dictionary gives the only meaning of the word "bugger" as sodomite, "from the adherence of the Bulgarians to the Eastern Church considered heretical".

Bogomil Cove on Rugged Island in the South Shetland Islands, Antarctica, is named after Priest Bogomil.

In Wallace Stegner's book Crossing to Safety, professor George Barnwell Ellis works (intermittently) for 25 years on a book about the Bogomils. It is unfinished at his death.

The Bogomils make a significant part in the Thomas Pynchon novel Against the Day, when Cyprian Lakewood becomes a postulant and gives up his life of sodomitic servitude as a spy.

In Olga Tokarczuk’s novel The Books of Jacob (2014), set in eastern and southeastern Europe in the eighteenth century, one character lives on a Bogomil settlement in modern-day Romania, and other characters visit him there and are inspired by the Bogomils’ practices.

In the computer game series Crusader Kings, bogomilism can be founded as a heresy of Christianity.

== See also ==
- Athinganoi
- Albigensian Crusade
- Constantine Chrysomalus
- Euchites
- Hypsistarians
- Nada Miletić
- Novgorod Codex
- Restorationism
- Synod of Tarnovo (1211)

== General and cited sources ==
- D. Angelov, Bogomilstvoto (Stara Zagora, 1995)
- L. P. Brockett, The Bogomils of Bulgaria and Bosnia: The Early Protestants of the East (s.l., 1879)
- J. Ivanov, Bogomilski knigi i legendi (Sofija, 1925). French translation by M. Ribeyrol, Livres et Légendes bogomiles (Paris, 1976).
- C. J. Jirecek, Geschichte d. Bulgaren (Prague, 1876), pp. 155, 174–175
- J. Meiers, Archbishop Ancient Order of Bogomil, of Americas'.
- D. Obolensky, The Bogomils: A Study in Balkan Neo-Manichaeism (Cambridge, 1948), reprint New York, 1978
- K. Papasov, Christen oder Ketzer – die Bogomilen (Stuttgart, 1983)
- S. Runciman, The Medieval Manichee: A Study of the Christian Dualist Heresy (Cambridge, 1947)
- V. Sharenkoff, A Study of Manicheism in Bulgaria (New York, 1927).
- J. C. Wolf, Historia Bogomilorum (Wittenberg, 1712)
- Euthymius Zygabenus, Narratio de Bogomilis, ed. Gieseler (Göttingen, 1842)
